= Dobrč =

- Village
- Location within Bosnia and Herzegovina
- Coordinates: 43.3524957°N 17.8684828°E
- Country: Bosnia and Herzegovina
- Entity: Federation of Bosnia and Herzegovina
- Canton: Herzegovina-Neretva
- Municipality: City of Mostar

Area
  - Total: 2.85 sq mi (7.37 km^{2})

Population (2013)
  - Total: 42
  - Density: 15/sq mi (5.7/km^{2})
- Time zone: UTC+1 (CET)
  - Summer (DST): UTC+2 (CEST)

Dobrč is a village in the City of Mostar, Bosnia and Herzegovina.

== Demographics ==
According to the 2013 census, its population was 42, all Bosniaks.
