= Vranjevići, Mostar =

Vranjevići
- Village
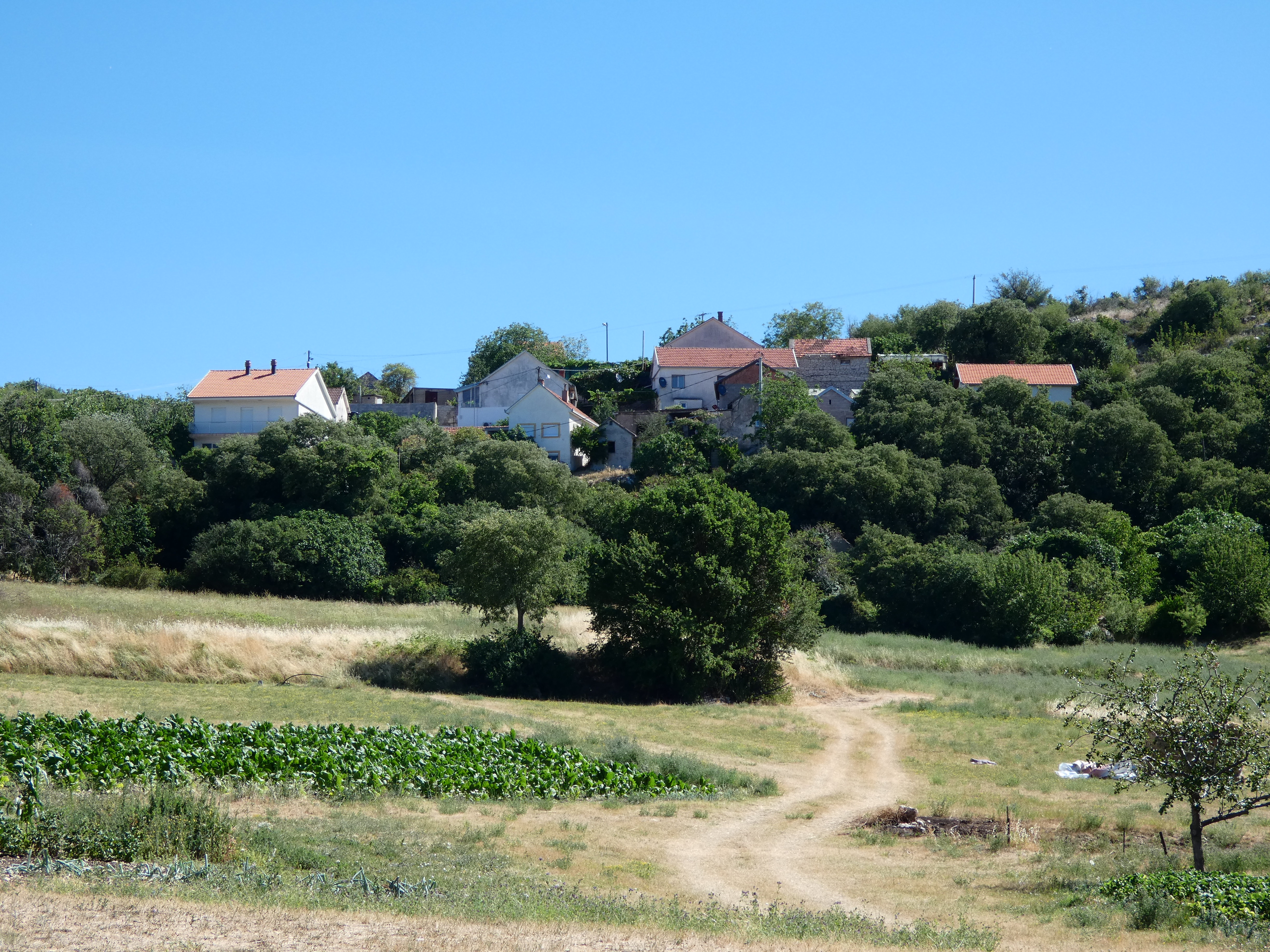

- Location within Bosnia and Herzegovina
- Coordinates: 43.2193728°N 17.912621°E
- Country: Bosnia and Herzegovina
- Entity: Federation of Bosnia and Herzegovina
- Canton: Herzegovina-Neretva
- Municipality: City of Mostar

Area
  - Total: 7.99 sq mi (20.70 km^{2})

Population (2013)
  - Total: 332
  - Density: 41.5/sq mi (16.0/km^{2})
- Time zone: UTC+1 (CET)
  - Summer (DST): UTC+2 (CEST)

Vranjevići is a village in the City of Mostar, Bosnia and Herzegovina.

== Demographics ==
According to the 2013 census, its population was 332, all Bosniaks.
