= Mostar =

City in Bosnia and Herzegovina

Mostar Мостар
- City
- Grad Mostar; Град Мостар; City of Mostar
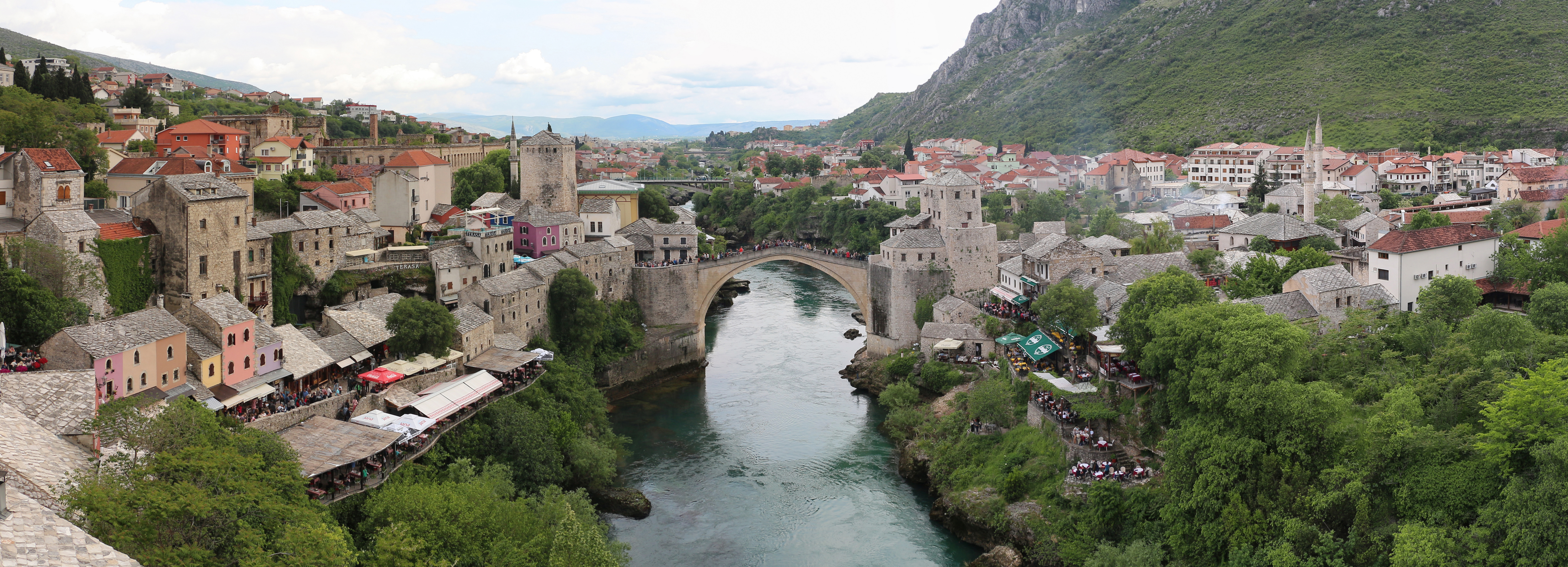
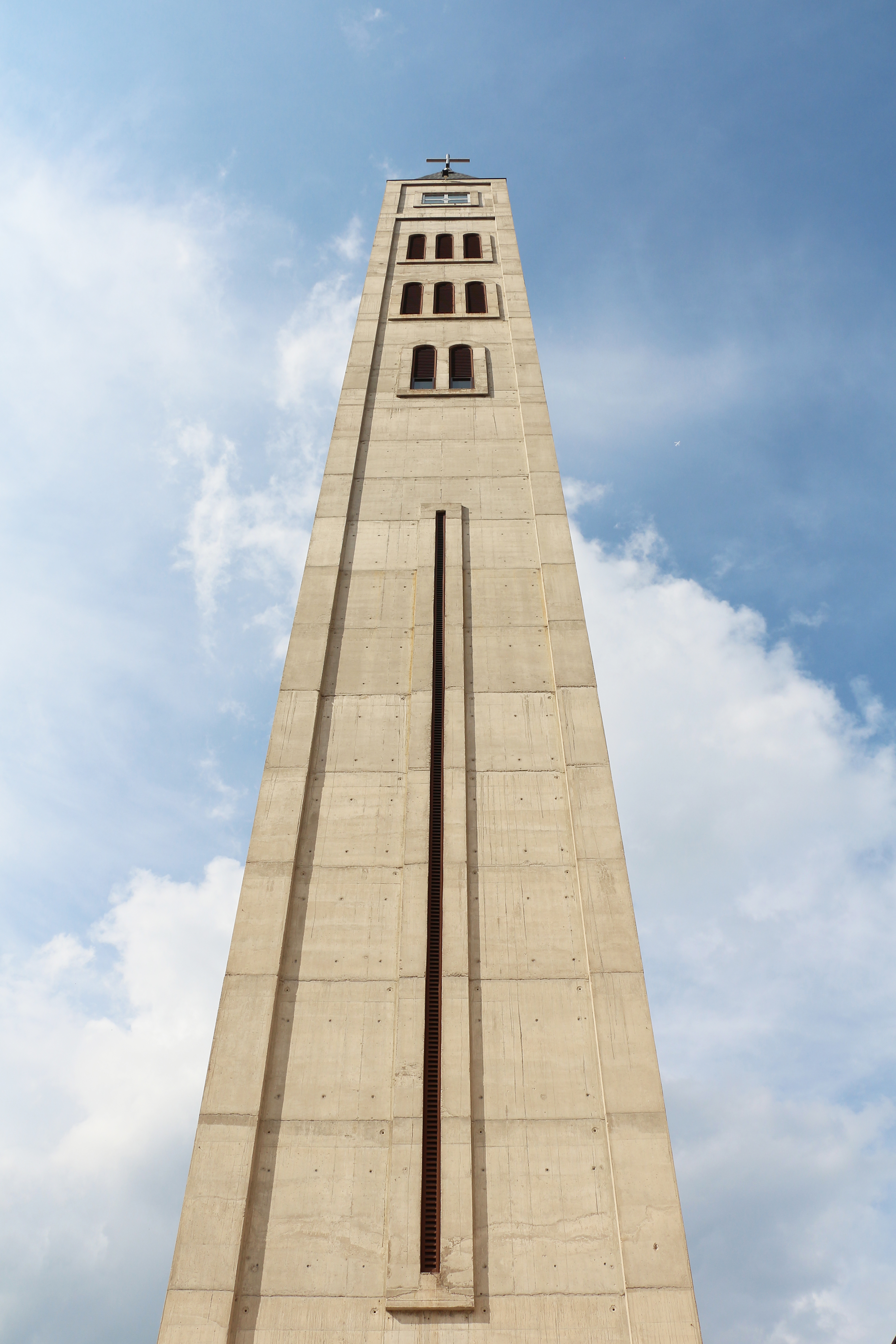
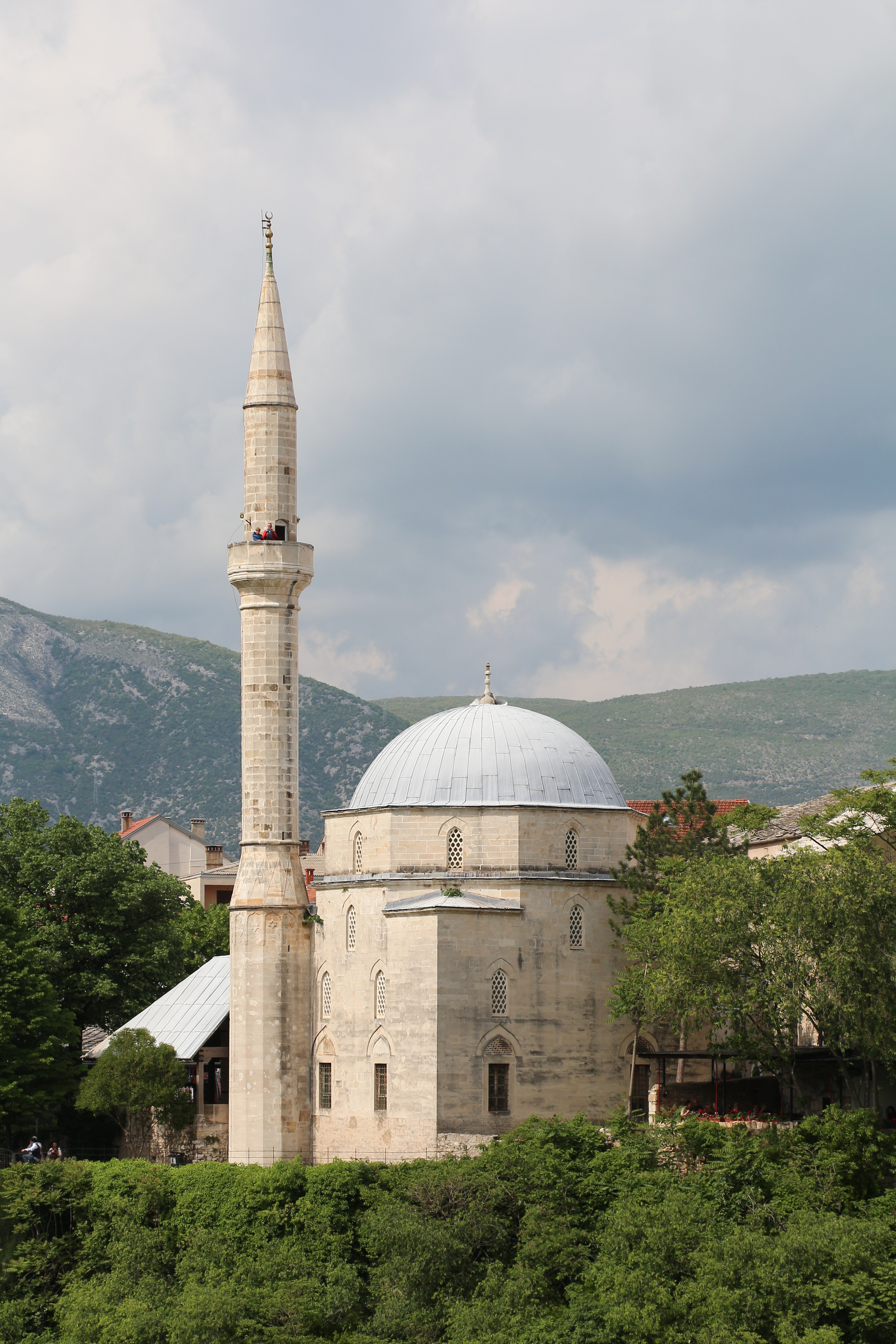
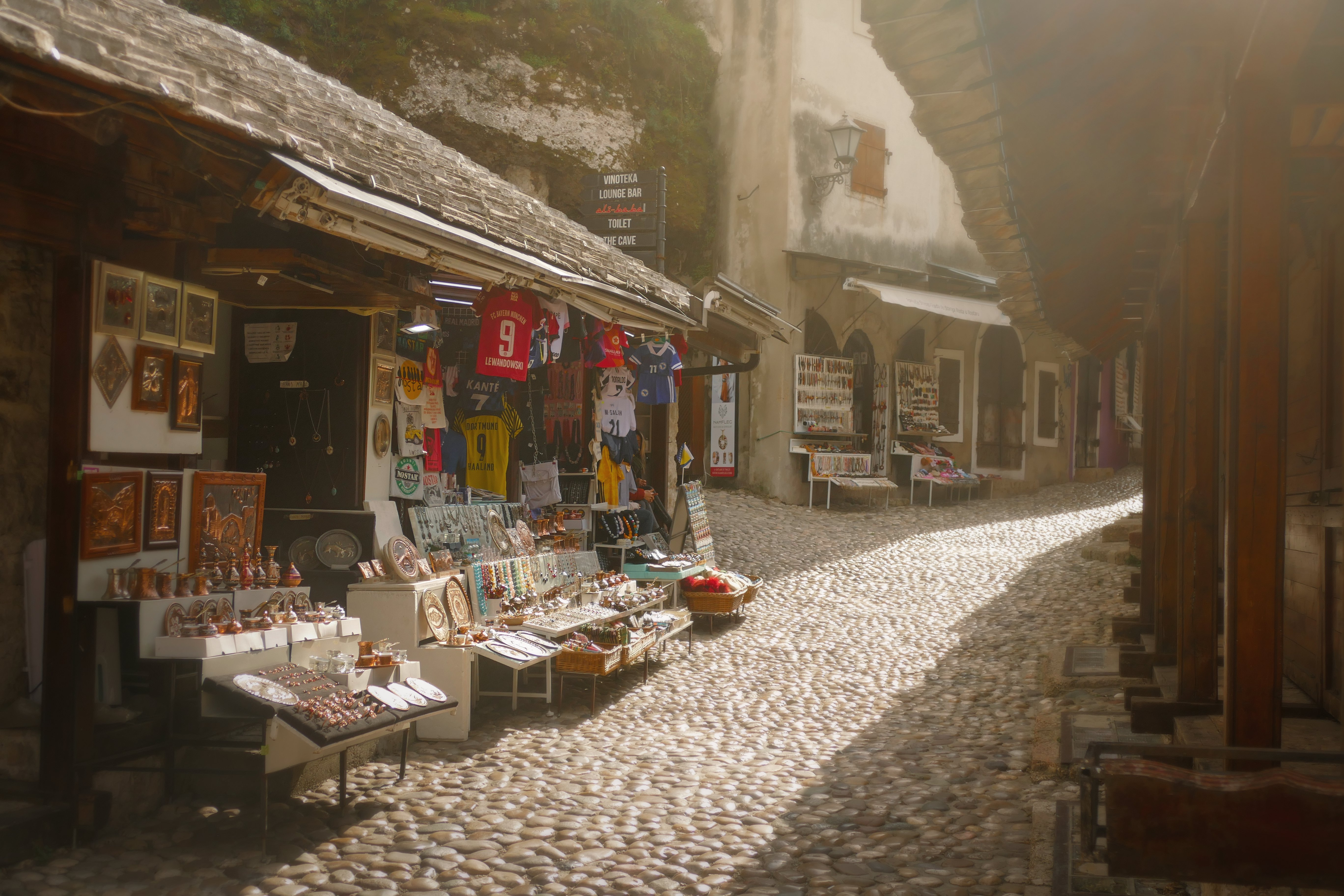
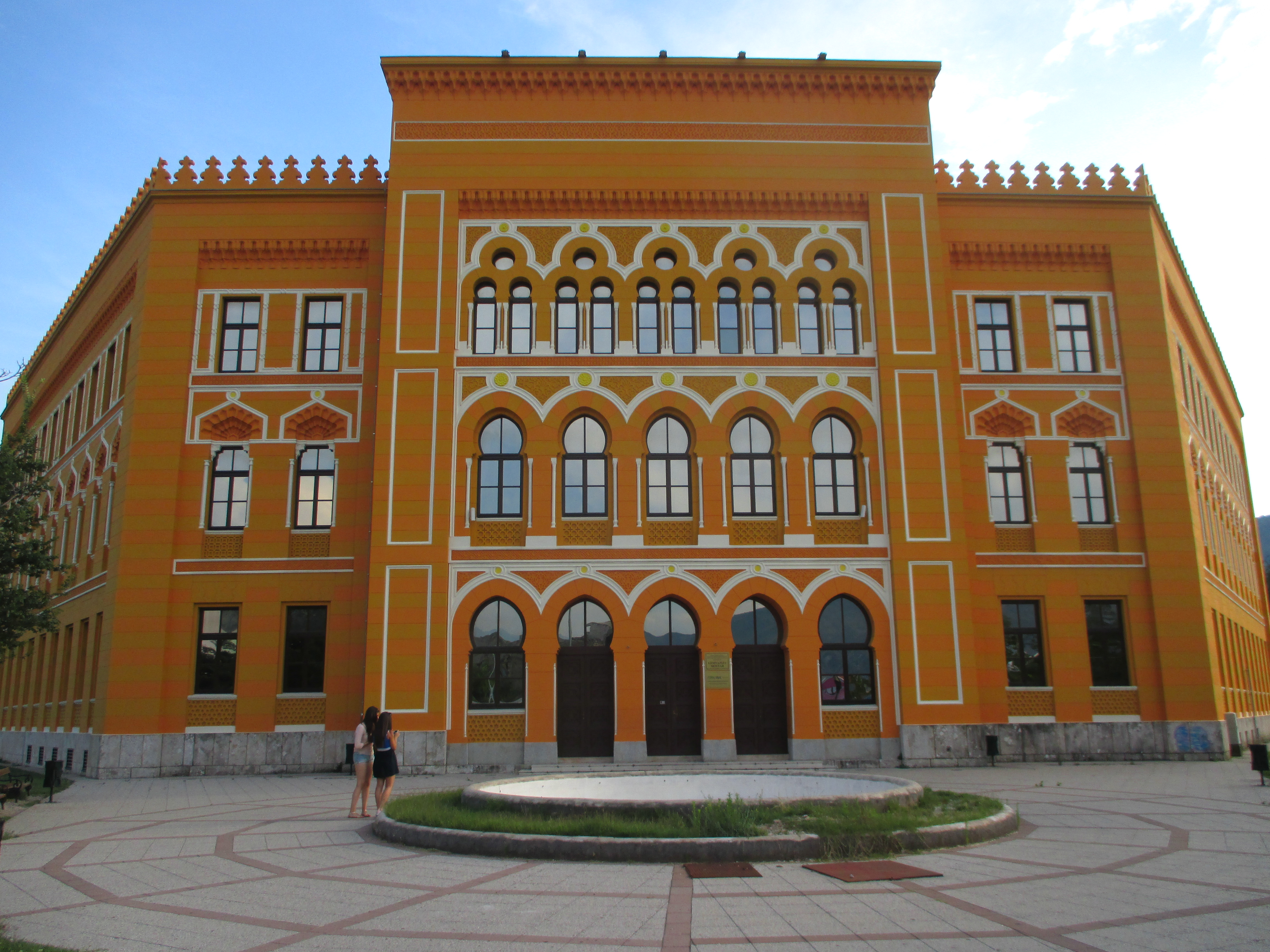
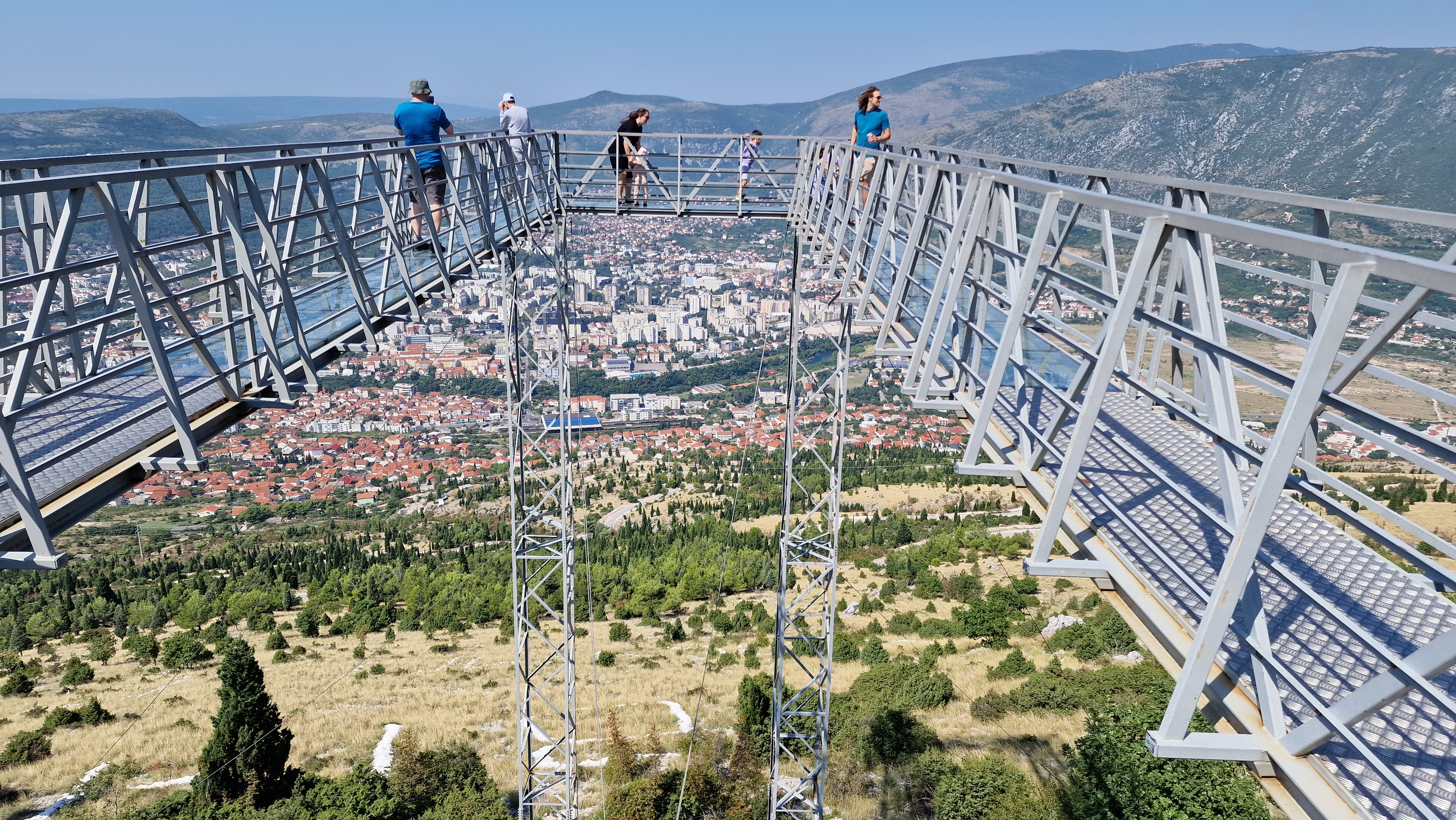
- Stari Most with Mostar skyline Peace Bell Tower Pasha Mosque Mostar bazar Mostar Gymnasium Mostar observation platform

- Flag Coat of arms
- Etymology: Bosnian: mostar, lit. 'bridge keeper'
- Map of Bosnia and Herzegovina (Mostar)
- Interactive map of Mostar
- Coordinates: 43°20′37″N 17°48′27″E
- Country: Bosnia and Herzegovina
- Entity: Federation of Bosnia and Herzegovina
- Canton: Herzegovina-Neretva
- Geographical region: Herzegovina
- Founded: 1452

Government
  - Mayor: Mario Kordić (HDZ BiH)

Area
  - City: 117.63 km^{2} (45.42 sq mi)
- Elevation: 60 m (200 ft)

Population
  - City: 113,169
  - Density: 962.08/km^{2} (2,491.8/sq mi)
  - Urban: 60,195
- Time zone: UTC+1 (CET)
  - Summer (DST): UTC+2 (CEST)
- Postal code: 88000
- Area code: +387 (0) 36
- Website: www.mostar.ba

Mostar (pronounced [mǒstaːr] (Note: In English, various phonetic renderings are used, some of them deviating from the initial stress of the native pronunciation. In British English, both /mɒˈstɑːr/ and /ˈmɒstɑːr/ are used. In American English, initially stressed /ˈmoʊstɑːr, ˈmɔːs-/ predominates.)) is a city and the administrative centre of Herzegovina-Neretva Canton of the Federation of Bosnia and Herzegovina, an entity of Bosnia and Herzegovina, and the historical capital of Herzegovina.

Mostar is situated on the Neretva River and is the fifth-largest city in the country. It was named after the bridge keepers (mostari) who guarded the Stari Most (Old Bridge) over the Neretva during the Ottoman era. The Old Bridge, a UNESCO World Heritage Site, commissioned by Suleiman the Magnificent in the 16th century, is one of Bosnia and Herzegovina's most visited landmarks, and is considered an exemplary piece of Islamic architecture in the Balkans. Mostar was also the capital of the predominantly Croat proto-state known as the Croatian Republic of Herzeg-Bosnia during the Bosnian War.

== History ==
=== Ancient and medieval history ===
Human settlements on the river Neretva, between Mount Hum and the Velež Mountain, have existed since prehistory, as witnessed by discoveries of fortified enceintes and cemeteries. Evidence of Roman occupation was discovered beneath the present town.

The name Mostar was first mentioned in a document from 1474, taking its name from the bridge-keepers (mostari); this refers to the existence of a wooden bridge which was used by traders, soldiers, and others. During this time, it was also the seat of a kadiluk (district with a regional judge). Since Mostar was on the trade route between the Adriatic and the mineral-rich regions of central Bosnia, the settlement began to spread to the right bank of the river.

Prior to 1474, the names of two towns, Nebojša and Cimski grad, appear in medieval historical sources, along with their later medieval territories and properties. In the early 15th century, the county (župa) of Večenike covered the site of present-day Mostar along the right bank of the Neretva, including the sites of Zahum, Cim, Ilići, Raštani, and Vojno. In 1408, this county belonged to Juraj Radivojević, who built Cim Fort (prior to 1443). Mostar is indirectly referred to in a 1454 charter of King Alfonso V of Aragon as Pons ("bridge"), for a bridge had already been built there. Prior to 1444, the Nebojša Tower was built on the left bank of the Neretva, which belonged to the late medieval county still known as Večenike or Večerić. The earliest documented reference to Mostar as a settlement dates back to 3 April 1452, when Ragusans from Dubrovnik wrote to their fellow countrymen in the service of Serbian Despot Đorđe Branković to say that Vladislav Hercegović had turned against his father Stjepan and occupied the town of Blagaj and other places, including “Duo Castelli al ponte de Neretua”.

=== Ottoman period ===
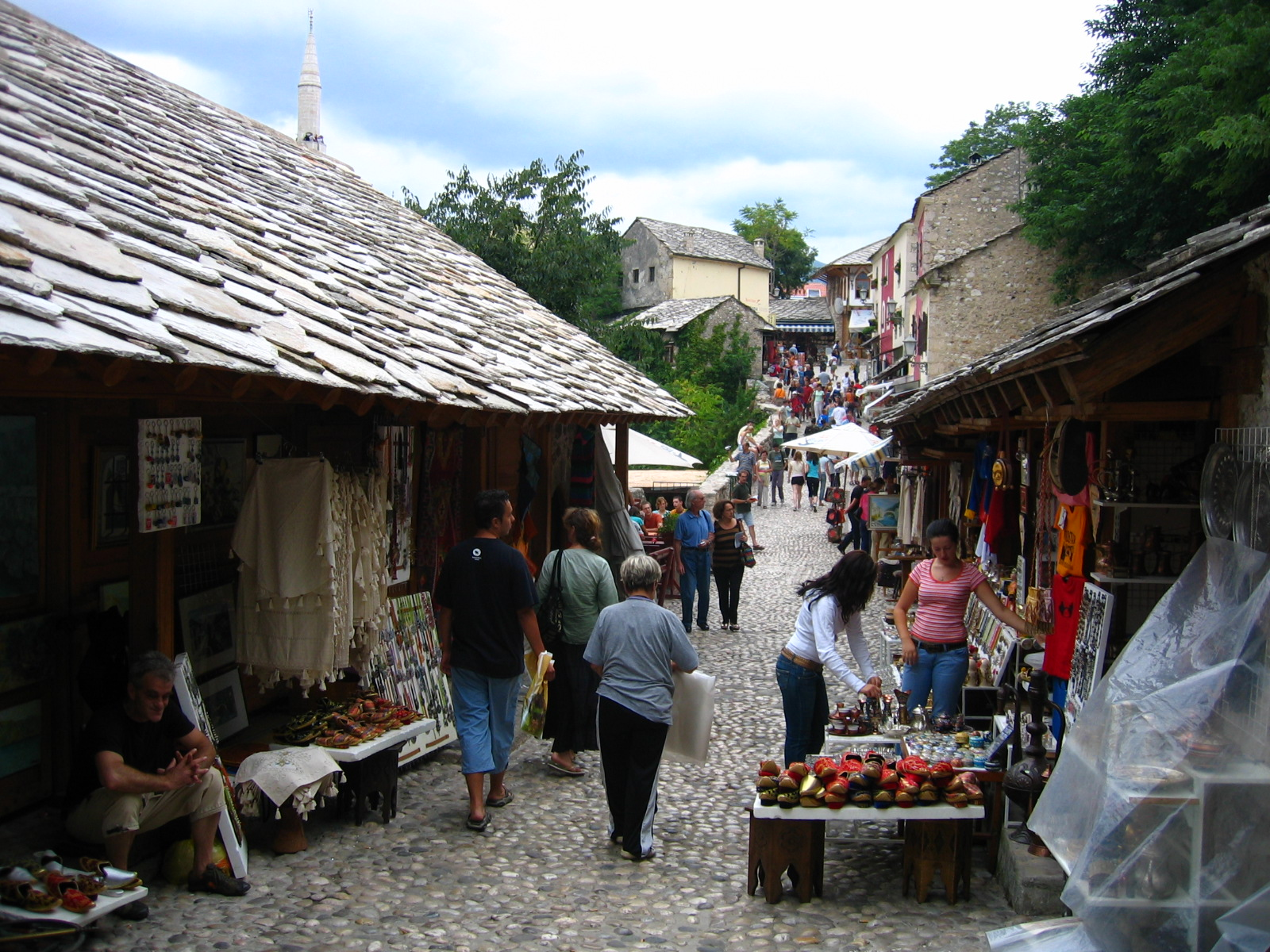
The Old Town Street

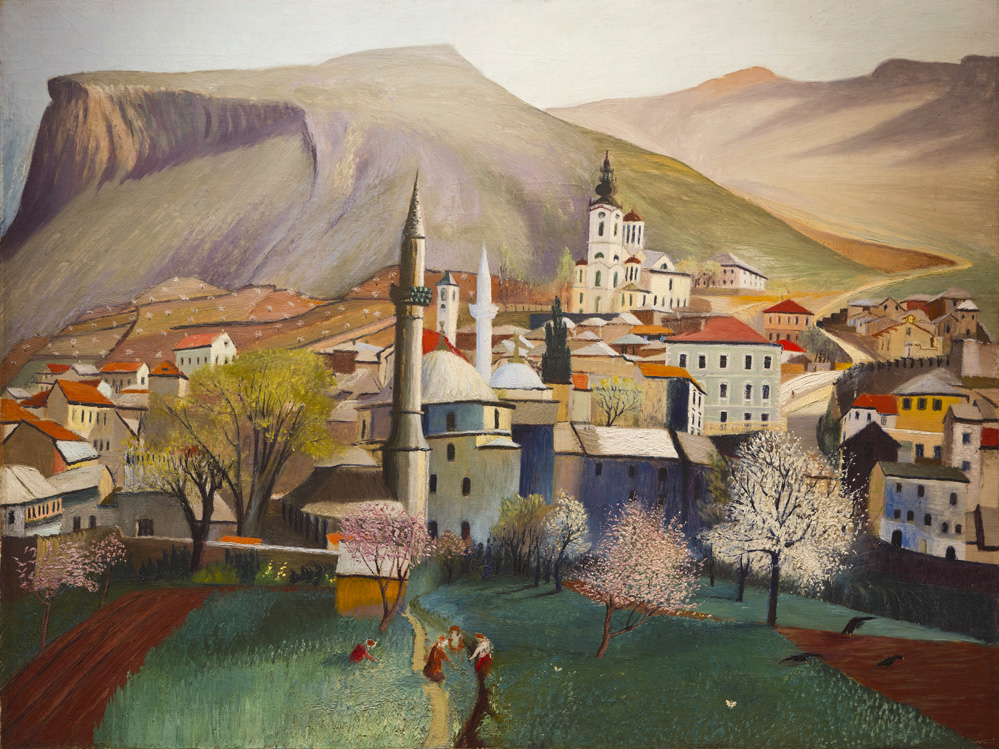
Springtime in Mostar by Tivadar Kosztka Csontváry (1853–1919)

In 1468, the region came under the rule of the Ottoman Empire and the urbanization of the settlement began. It was named Köprühisar, meaning fortress at the bridge, at the centre of which was a cluster of 15 houses. The town was organized into two distinct areas: čaršija, the crafts and commercial centre of the settlement, and mahala or a residential area.

The town was fortified between the years 1520 and 1566, and the wooden bridge was rebuilt in stone. In 1519 (Hijri 925), the settlement was recorded as a castle and both as Mostar and as Köprühisar, and Muslims and Christians inhabited it. It had four Muslim households and 85 Christian households. The stone bridge, the Old Bridge (Stari most), was erected in 1566 on the orders of Sultan Suleiman the Magnificent and at 28 m (92 ft) long and 20 m (66 ft) high, quickly became a wonder in its own time. Later becoming the city's symbol, the Old Bridge was designed by Mimar Hayruddin, a student and apprentice of Ottoman architect Mimar Sinan. In the late 16th century, Köprühisar was one of the towns of the Sanjak of Herzegovina. In the 17th century, Turkish traveler and author Evliya Çelebi wrote of the bridge thus:

the bridge is like a rainbow arch soaring up to the skies, extending from one cliff to the other... I, a poor and miserable servant of Allah, have passed through 16 countries, but I have never seen such a high bridge. It is thrown from rock to rock as high as the sky.

The first church in the city of Mostar, a Serbian Orthodox Church, was built in 1834 during Ottoman rule.

=== Austrian and Yugoslav period ===
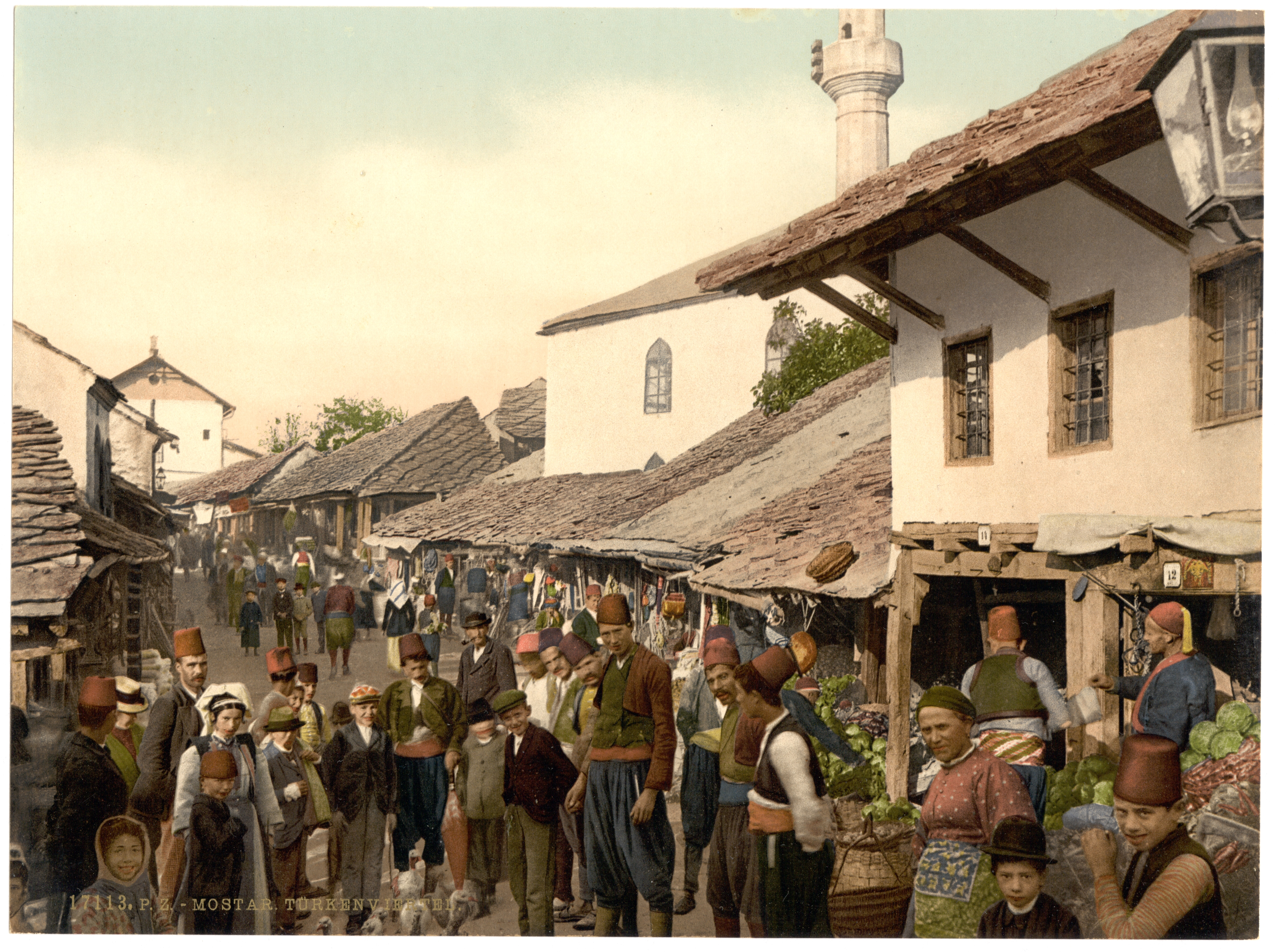
People of Mostar in 1890–1900

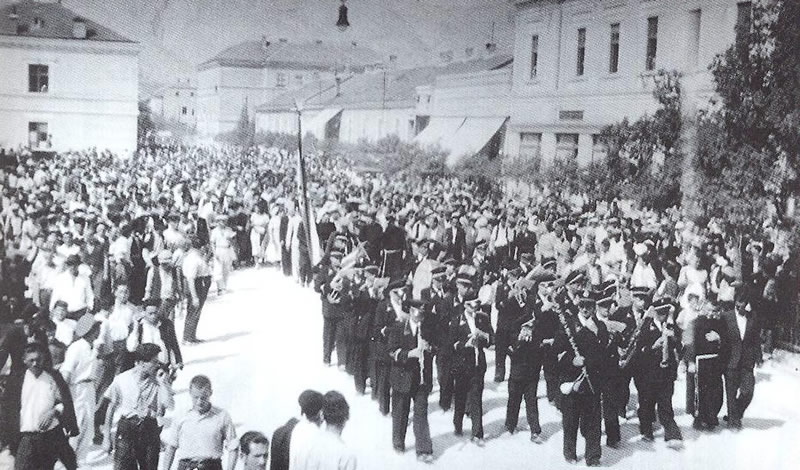
People gathered waiting for Stjepan Radić to arrive in Mostar in 1925

Austria-Hungary took control over Bosnia and Herzegovina in 1878 and ruled the region until the aftermath of World War I in 1918, when it became part of the State of Slovenes, Croats and Serbs and then Yugoslavia. During this period, Mostar was the main urban centre of Herzegovina. In 1881, the town became the seat of the Catholic diocese of Mostar-Duvno and, in 1939, it became a part of the Banovina of Croatia. During World War II, Mostar was annexed into the Nazi German fascist puppet state, the Independent State of Croatia.

During the period of Austro-Hungarian rule (1878–1918), Mostar's city council cooperated with the Austro-Hungarian administration to implement sweeping reforms in city planning: broad avenues and an urban grid were imposed on the western bank of the Neretva, and significant investments were made in infrastructure, communications, and housing. City administrators like Mustafa Mujaga Komadina were central players in these transformations, which facilitated growth and linked the eastern and western banks of the city. Noteworthy examples of Austro-Hungarian architecture include Hotel Neretva, the Municipality building, which was designed by the architect Josip Vancaš from Sarajevo, residential districts around the Rondo, and Gimnazija Mostar from 1902, designed by František Blažek.

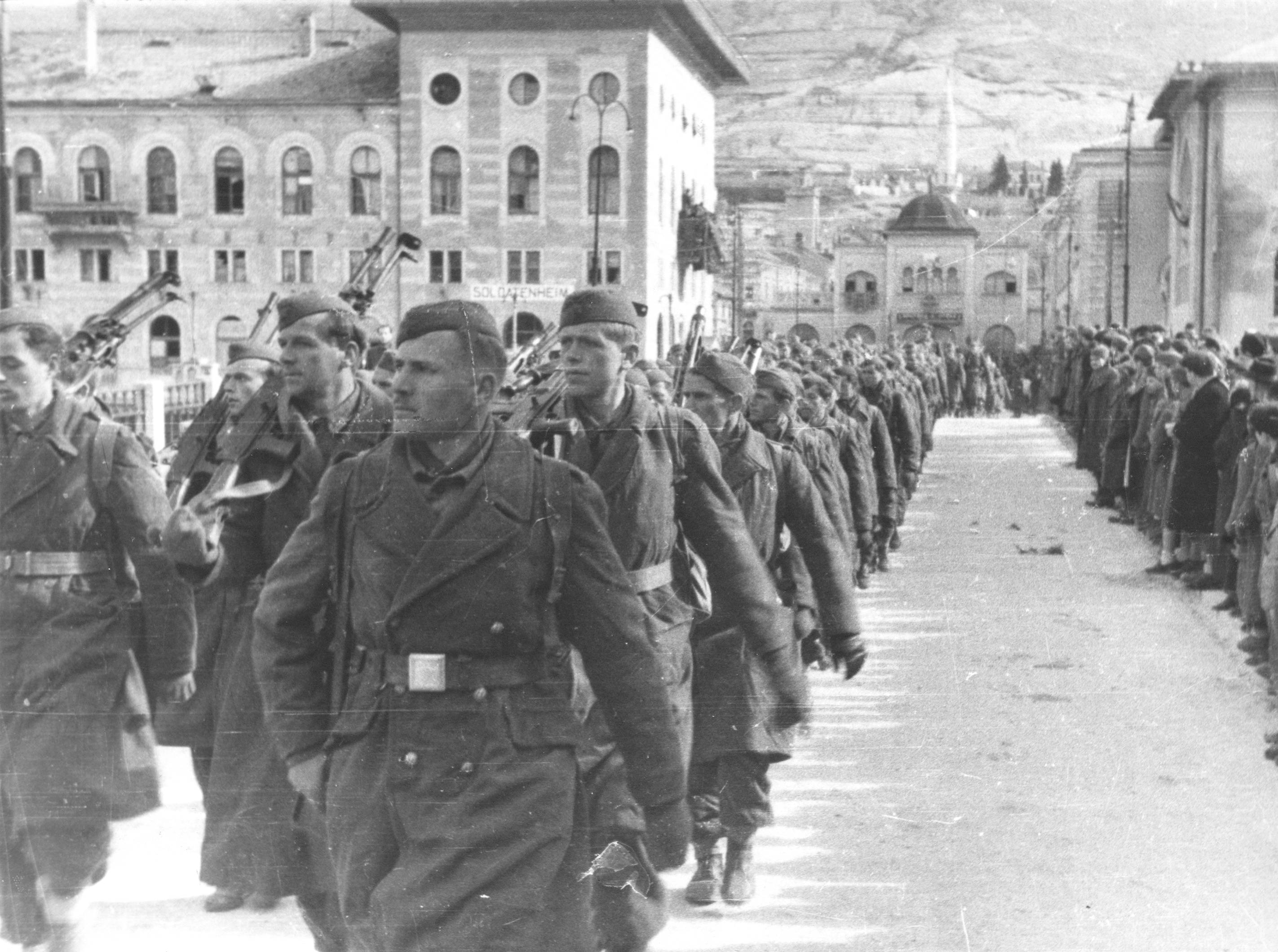
8th Yugoslav Partisans' Corps in liberated Mostar, February 1945

After World War II, Mostar developed industries producing plastics, tobacco, bauxite, wine, aircraft and aluminium. Several dams (Grabovica, Salakovac, Mostar) were built in the region to harness the hydroelectric power of the Neretva. The city was a major industrial and tourist center and prospered economically during the time of the Socialist Federal Republic of Yugoslavia.

When the German and Italian Zones of Influence were revised on 24 June 1942, Mostar fell in Zone II, administered civilly by Croatia but militarily by Italy. The boundary with Zone III was on Prenj.

Between 1948 and 1974, the industrial base was expanded with the construction of a metal-working factory, cotton textile mills, and an aluminum plant. Skilled workers, both men and women, entered the work force, and the social and demographic profile of the city was broadened dramatically; between 1945 and 1980, Mostar's population grew from 18,000 to 100,000.

Because Mostar's eastern bank was burdened by inadequate infrastructure, the city expanded on the western bank with the construction of large residential blocks. Local architects favored an austere modernist aesthetic, prefabrication, and repetitive modules. Commercial buildings in the functionalist style appeared on the historic eastern side of the city as well, replacing more intimate timber constructions that had survived since Ottoman times. In the 1970s and 1980s, a healthy local economy fueled by foreign investment spurred recognition and conservation of the city's cultural heritage. An economically sustainable plan to preserve the old town of Mostar was implemented by the municipality, which drew thousands of tourists from the Adriatic coast and invigorated the economy of the city. The results of this ten-year project earned Mostar an Aga Khan Award for Architecture in 1986.

According to the 1991 census, Mostar had 127,000 inhabitants with roughly an equal number of Bosniaks (34.6%) and Croats (34%), 18.8% Serbs, and 13.6% of those who declared themselves Yugoslavs or Others.

=== Bosnian War ===
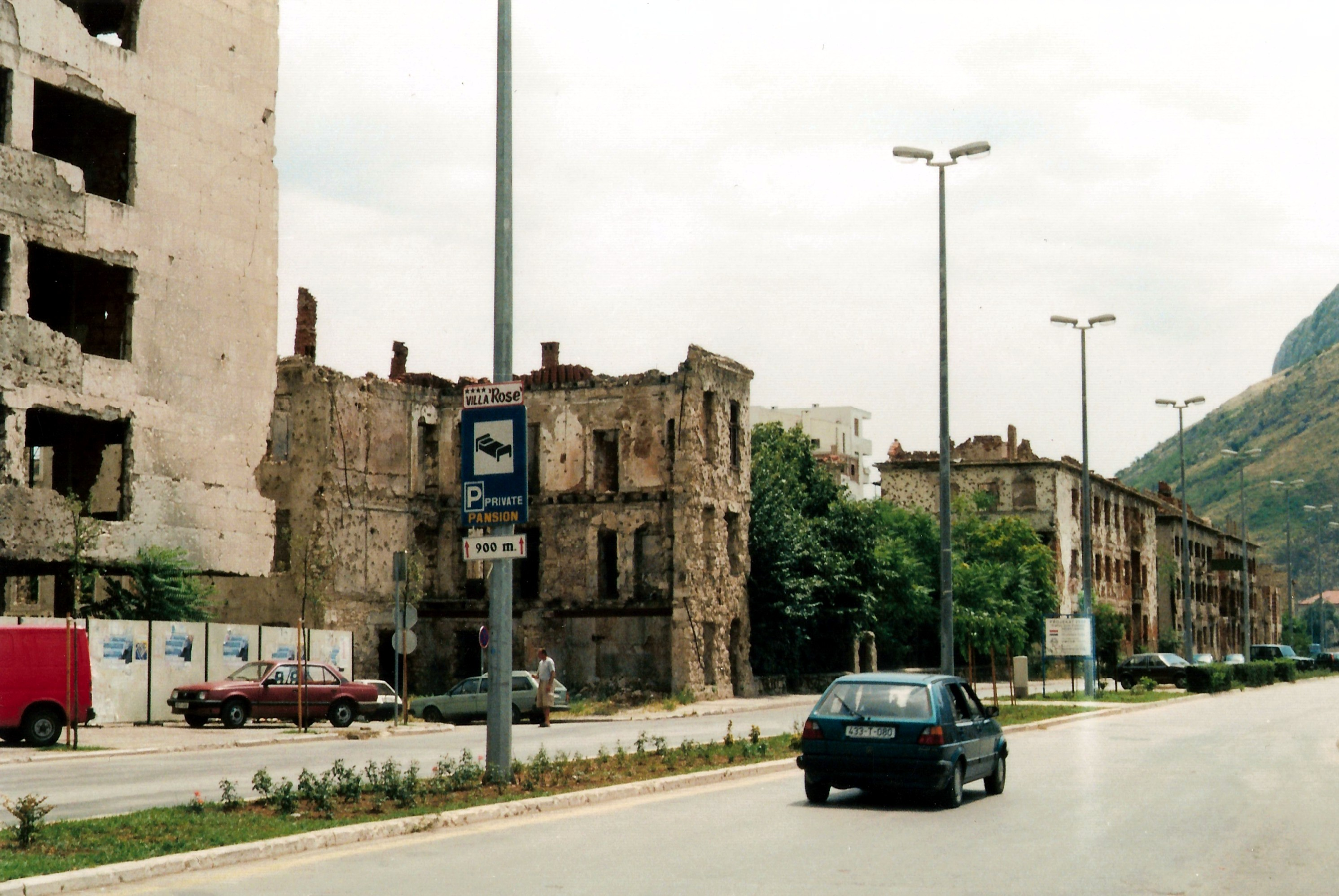
War damage on the former Mostar frontline, 2001

After Bosnia and Herzegovina declared independence from Yugoslavia in April 1992, the town was besieged by the Yugoslav People's Army (JNA), following clashes between the JNA and Croat forces. The Croats were organized into the Croatian Defence Council (HVO) and were joined by a sizable number of Bosniaks. The JNA artillery periodically shelled neighbourhoods outside of their control from early April.

On 7 June, the Croatian Army (HV) launched an offensive code-named Operation Jackal, the objective of which was to relieve Mostar and break the JNA siege of Dubrovnik. The offensive was supported by the HVO, which attacked the Army of Republika Srpska (VRS) positions around Mostar. By 12 June, the HVO secured the western part of the city, and by 21 June, the VRS was completely pushed out from the eastern part. Numerous religious buildings and most of the city's bridges were destroyed or severely damaged during the fighting. Among them were the Catholic Cathedral of Mary, Mother of the Church, the Franciscan Church and Monastery, the Bishop's Palace, and 12 out of 14 mosques in the city. After the VRS was pushed from the city, the Serbian Orthodox Žitomislić Monastery and the Cathedral of the Holy Trinity were demolished.

Throughout late 1992, tensions between Croats and Bosniaks increased in Mostar. In early 1993 the Croat–Bosniak War escalated and by mid-April 1993 Mostar had become a divided city with the western part dominated by HVO forces and the eastern part controlled by the Army of the Republic of Bosnia and Herzegovina (ARBiH). Fighting broke out in May when both sides of the city came under intense artillery fire. The city was divided along ethnic lines, with a number of offensives taking place, resulting in a series of stalemates. The Croat–Bosniak conflict ended with the signing of the Washington Agreement in 1994, and the Bosnian War ended with the Dayton Agreement in 1995. Around 2,000 people died in Mostar during the war.

Two wars (Serb forces versus Bosniak and Croatian and Croat-Bosniak war) left Mostar physically devastated and ethno-territorially divided between a Croat-majority west bank (with ca. 55,000 residents) and a Bosniak-majority old City and east bank (with ca. 50,000 residents), with the frontline running parallel to the Neretva River. Most Serbs had fled the city.

=== Post-war developments ===
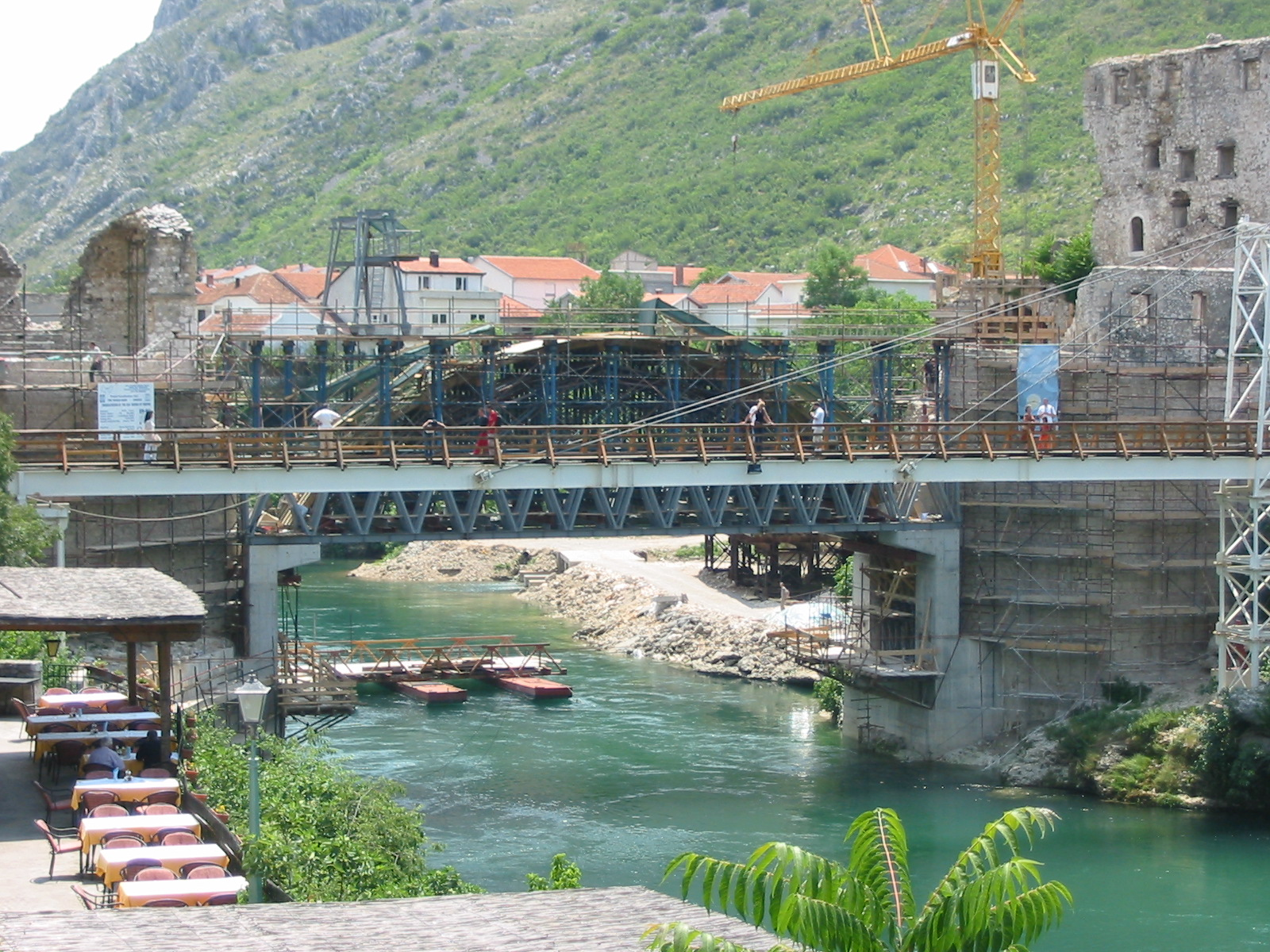
The Old Bridge undergoing reconstruction in June 2003.

Since the end of the wider war in 1995, great progress has been made in the reconstruction of the city of Mostar under the European Union Administration of the City of Mostar (EUAM). Over 15 million dollars has been spent on restoration.

A monumental project to rebuild the Old Bridge, which was destroyed during the Bosnian War by HVO, to the original design, and restore surrounding structures and historic neighbourhoods was initiated in 1999 and mostly completed by spring 2004. The money for this reconstruction was donated by Spain (who had a sizable contingent of peacekeeping troops stationed in the surrounding area during the conflict), the United States, Turkey, Italy, the Netherlands, and Croatia. A grand opening was held on 23 July 2004 under heavy security.

In parallel, the Aga Khan Trust for Culture and the World Monuments Fund, with funding provided by the World Bank, undertook a five-year-long restoration and rehabilitation effort to regenerate the most significant areas of historic Mostar, and particularly the urban tissue around the Old Bridge. Also in July 2004, the Stari Grad Agency was launched to operate and maintain the restored buildings, including the Old Bridge complex, and promote Mostar as a cultural and tourist destination.

In July 2005, UNESCO inscribed the Old Bridge and its closest vicinity onto the World Heritage List.

International reconstruction efforts were also aimed at the reunification of the divided city. The February 1996 Mostar Agreement led to the adoption of the Interim Statute of the city the same month, and to 1 year of EUAM, headed by former Bremen mayor Hans Koschnick, until early 1997.

After six years of implementation, in 2003, OHR Paddy Ashdown established an "international commission for reforming Mostar", whose final report noted how the HDZ/SDA power-sharing in Mostar had entrenched division and corruption, with "rampant parallelism" in administrative structures and usurpation of power by the municipalities over the City. A new Statute was negotiated, and finally imposed in February 2004 by OHR Paddy Ashdown.

In November 2010, the Constitutional Court struck down as discriminatory the electoral framework for Mostar. The Bosniak and Croat ruling parties were unable, however, to reach a new compromise. Lacking a legal basis, local elections could not take place in Mostar in 2012 and 2016, and outgoing mayor Ljubo Bešlić (HDZ BiH) remained in office as the only person authorised to allocate the city budget on an emergency basis. Almost a decade without administration led to a decline in service provision, including trash collection. In October 2019, Irma Baralija won a case against Bosnia and Herzegovina at the European Court of Human Rights for the lack of elections in Mostar. Finally, a political deal, agreed under international mediation in June 2020, enabled legislative amendments in July 2020 and the conduct of the vote in Mostar on 20 December 2020.

== Architecture ==
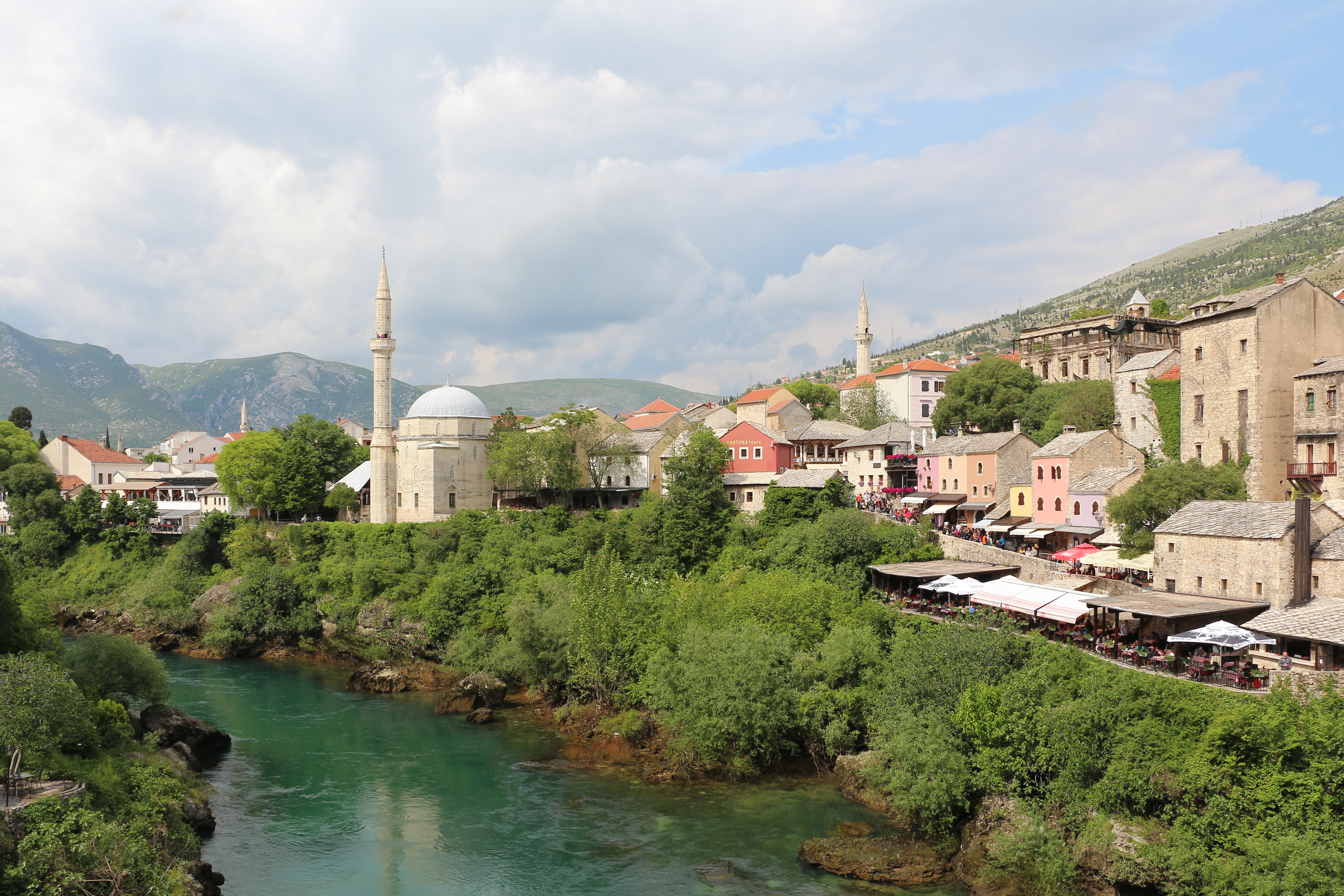
Old Town of Mostar

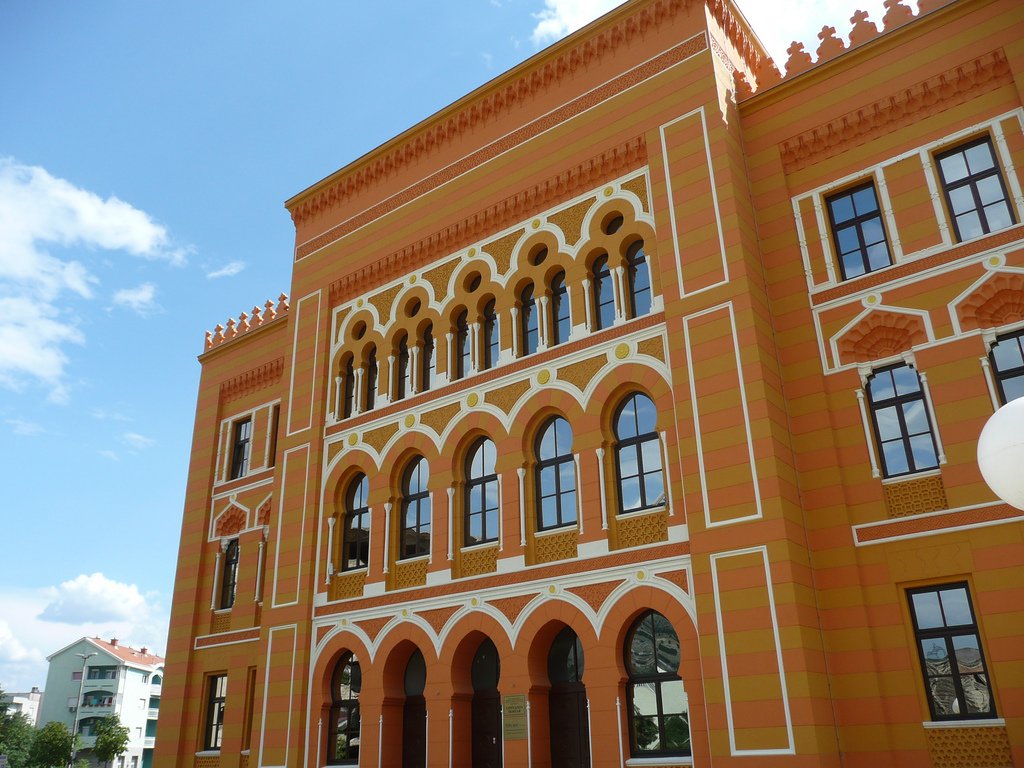
Gimnazija Mostar, designed by architect František Blažek

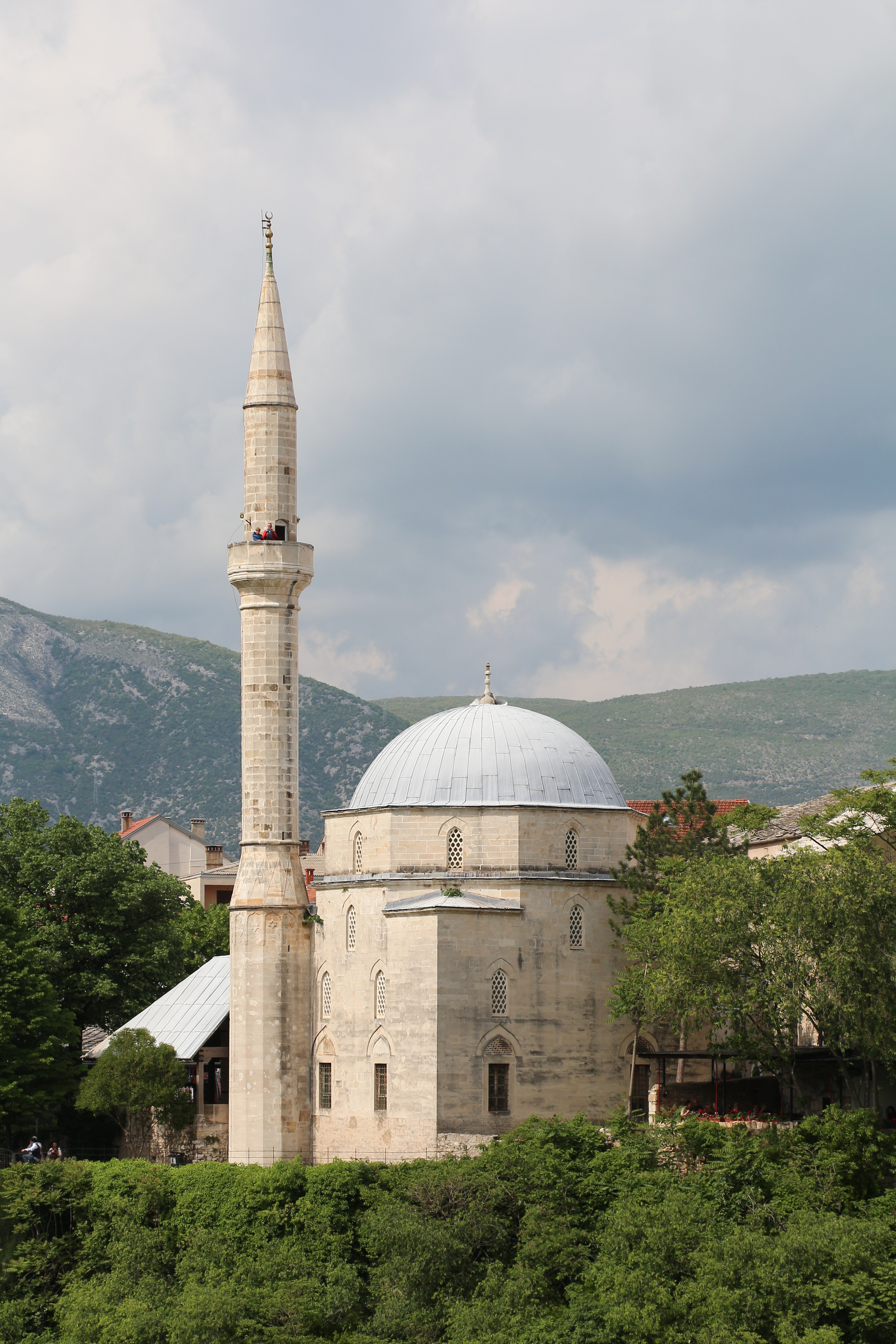
Koski Mehmed Paša Mosque

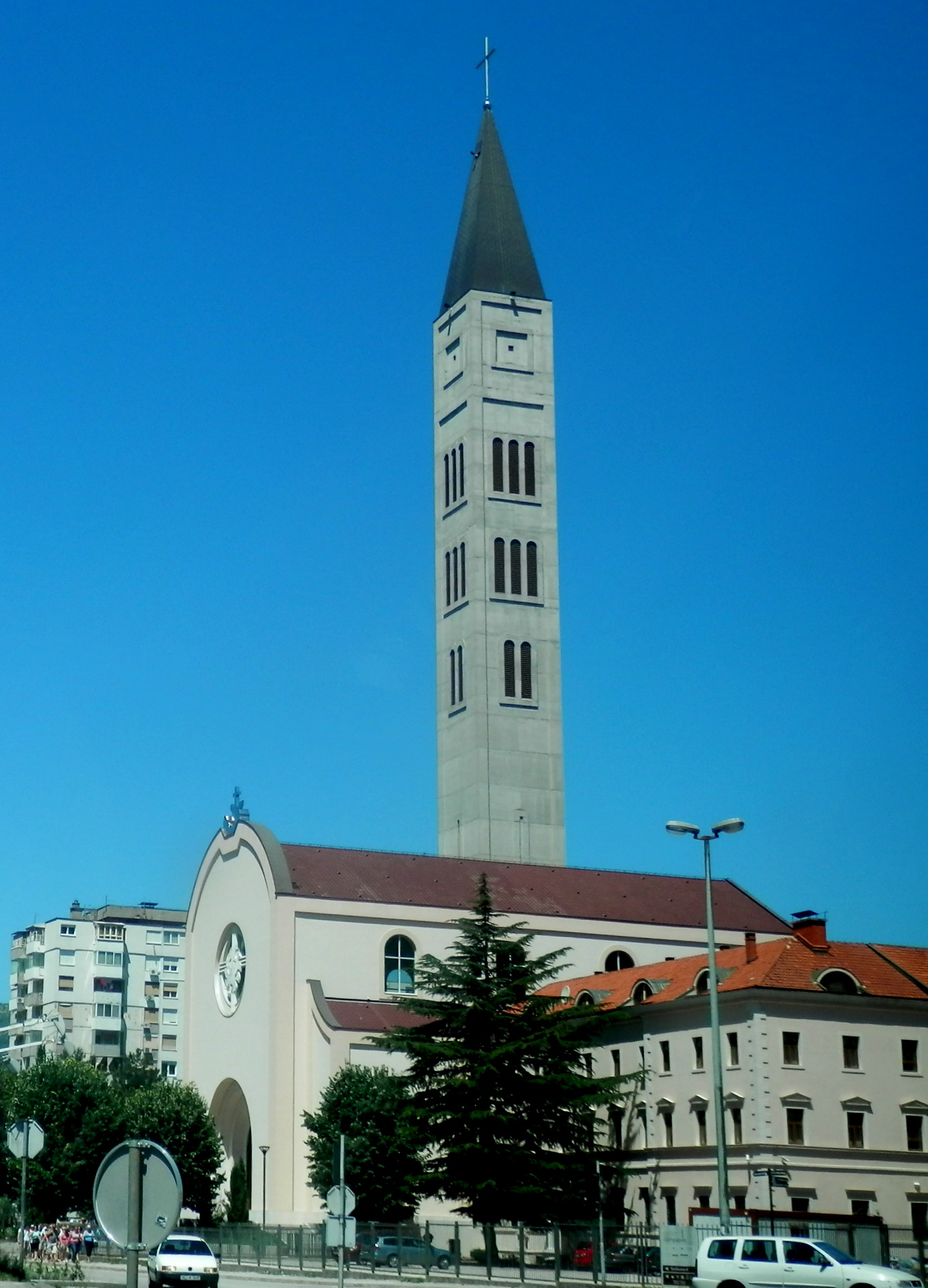
Catholic church and Franciscan monastery of St. Peter and Paul

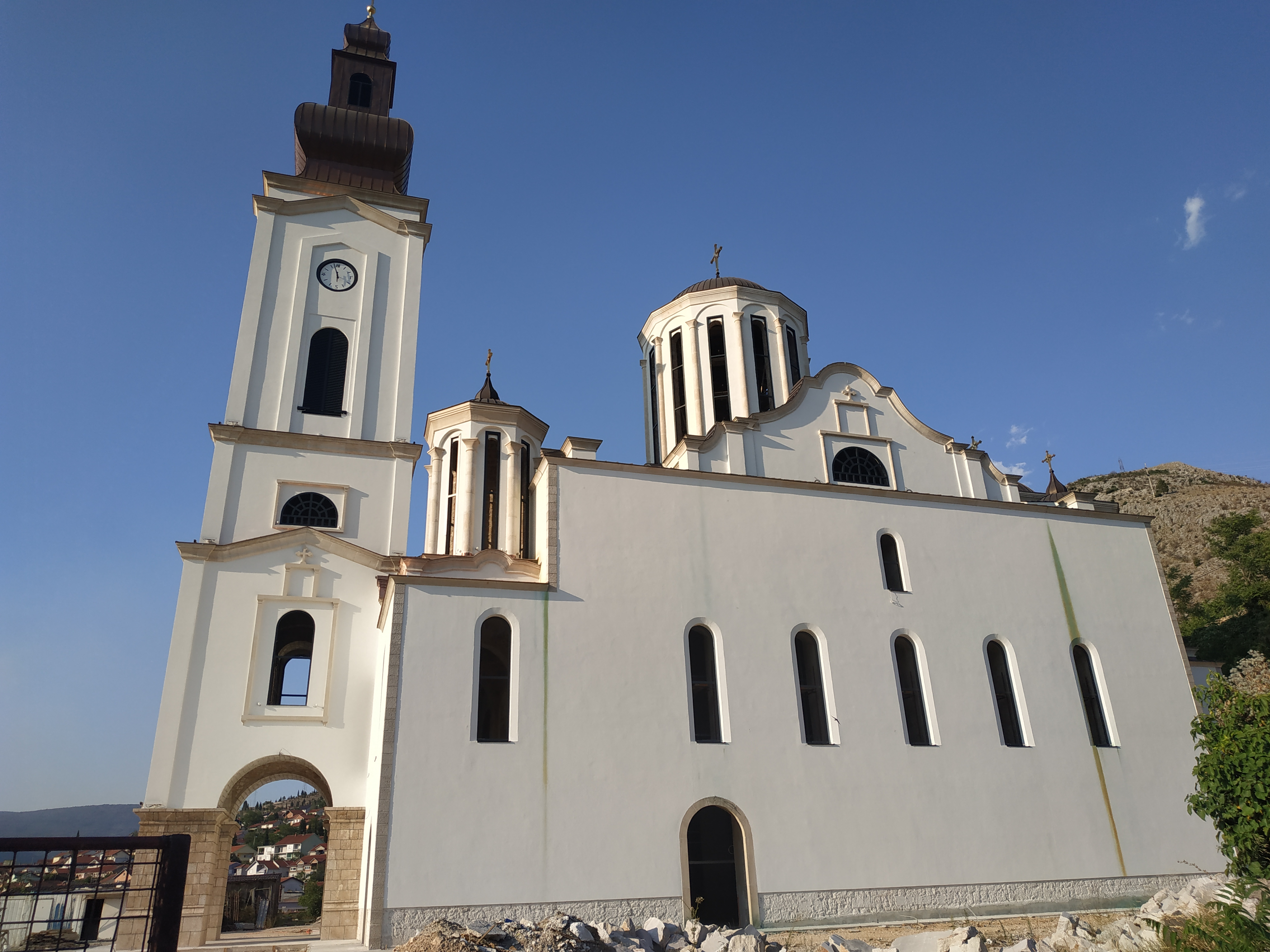
Holy Trinity Cathedral

Mostar has architecturally noteworthy buildings in a wide range of styles. Historicist architectural styles reflected cosmopolitan interest and exposure to foreign aesthetic trends and were artfully merged with indigenous styles. Examples include the Italianate Franciscan church, the Ottoman Muslibegovića house, the Dalmatian Ćorović House and an Orthodox cathedral which was built as gift from the Sultan.

The Ottomans used monumental architecture to affirm, extend, and consolidate their colonial holdings. Administrators and bureaucrats – many of them indigenous people who converted from Christianity to Islam – founded mosque complexes that generally included Koranic schools, soup kitchens, or markets.

Old Bridge Area of the Old City of Mostar
UNESCO World Heritage Site
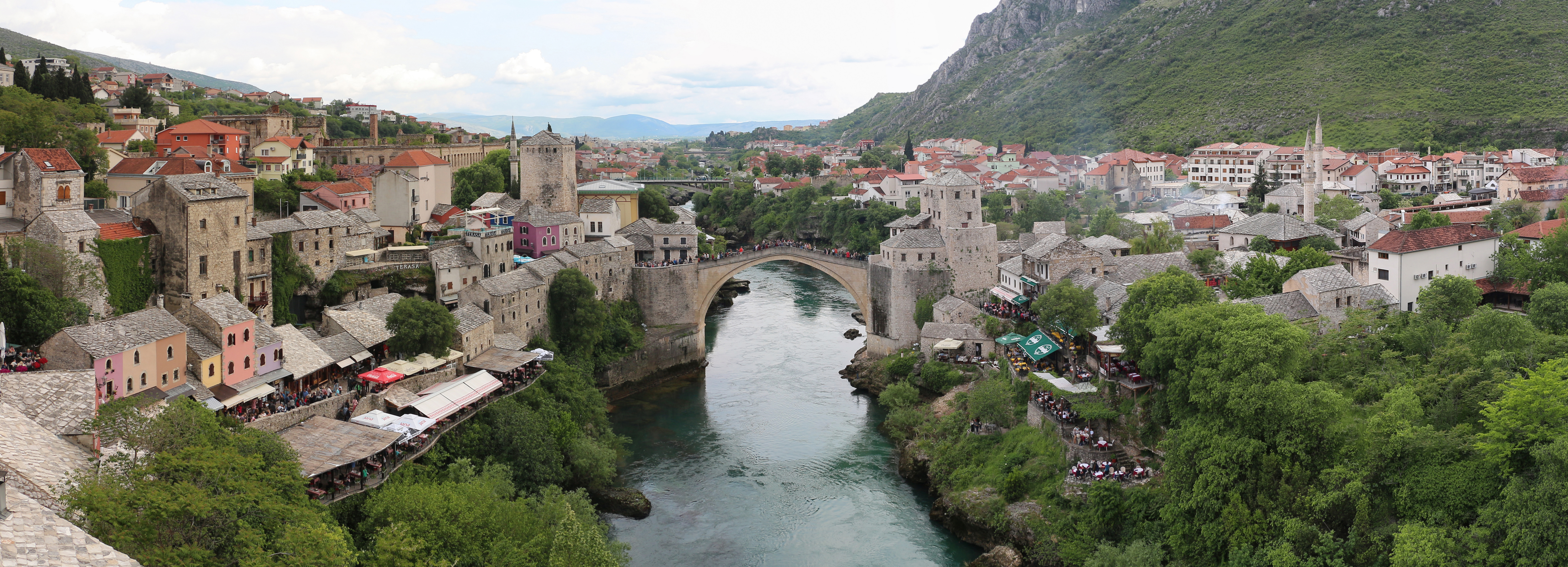
- Old Bridge in the heart of the Old City of Mostar (viewed from the north)
- Interactive map of Old Bridge Area of the Old City of Mostar
- Criteria: Cultural: vi
- Reference: 946
- Inscription: 2005 (29th Session)
- Area: 7.6 ha (19 acres)
- Buffer zone: 47.6 ha (118 acres)

Out of the thirteen original mosques dating from the 16th and 17th centuries, seven have been lost during the 20th century for ideological reasons or by bombardment. One of the two 19th-century Orthodox churches has also disappeared, while the early 20th-century synagogue, after suffering severe damage in World War II, has been converted into a theatre. Several Ottoman inns also survived, along with other buildings from this period of Mostar's history, such as fountains and schools.

The majority of administrative buildings are from the Austro-Hungarian period and have neoclassical and Secessionist characteristics. A number of surviving late Ottoman houses demonstrate the component features of this form of domestic architecture – upper storey for residential use, hall, paved courtyard, and veranda on one or two storeys. The later 19th-century residential houses are predominantly in the neoclassical style.

A number of early trading and craft buildings still exist, notably some low shops in wood or stone, stone storehouses, and a group of former tanneries around an open courtyard. Once again, the 19th-century commercial buildings are predominantly neoclassical. A number of elements of the early fortifications are visible, namely the Hercegusa Tower, dating from the medieval period. By contrast, the Ottoman defense edifices are represented by the Halebinovka and Tara Towers – the watchtowers at the ends of the Old Bridge, and a stretch of the ramparts.

The oldest single arch stone bridge in Mostar, the Kriva Cuprija ("Sloping Bridge"), was built in 1558 by the Ottoman architect Cejvan Kethoda. It is said that this was to be a test before the major construction of the Stari Most began. The Old Bridge was completed in 1566 and was hailed as one of the greatest architectural achievements in the Ottoman Balkans. The single-arch stone bridge is a replica of the original bridge that stood for over 400 years, and Hajrudin, a student of the great Ottoman architect Sinan, designed it. It spans 28.7 m (94 ft) of the Neretva river, 21 m (69 ft) above the summer water level. The Halebija and Tara towers have always housed the guardians of the bridge, and during Ottoman times, they were also used as storehouses for ammunition. The arch is a perfect semicircle 8.56 m (28.1 ft) in width and 4.15 m (13.6 ft) in height. The frontage and vault are made of regular stone cubes incorporated into the horizontal layers all along the vault. The space between the vault, the frontal walls, and the footpath is filled with cracked stone. The bridge footpath and the approaching roads are paved with cobblestones, as are the main roads in the town. Stone steps enable people to ascend to the bridge from either side. During the armed conflict between Bosniaks and Bosnian Croats in the Bosnian War in the 1990s, the bridge was destroyed by the HVO (Croatian Defence Council).

The Cejvan Cehaj Mosque, built in 1552, is the oldest in Mostar. Later, a madrasa (Islamic school) was built on the same compound. The Old Bazaar, Kujundziluk, is named after the goldsmiths who traditionally created and sold their wares on this street, and still sells authentic paintings and copper or bronze carvings of the Stari Most, pomegranates (the natural symbol of Herzegovina), or the stećaks (medieval tombstones).

The Koski Mehmed Paša Mosque, built in 1617, is open to visitors. Visitors may enter the mosque and take photos (price of entry is 10KM). The minaret is also open to the public and is accessible from inside the mosque. Just around the corner from the mosque is the Tepa Market. This has been a busy marketplace since Ottoman times. It now sells mostly fresh produce grown in Herzegovina, and, when in season, the figs and pomegranates are extremely popular. Local honey is also a prominent specialty, being produced all around Herzegovina.

== Culture ==
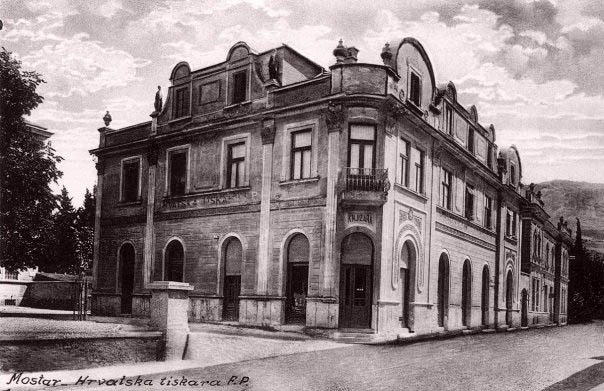
First Croatian printing office in Mostar, 1920

The magazine Most, along with Šantić's Poetry Evenings, was the most important outlet for cultural and artistic production in the city and the region, offering space for upstart poets and writers. Dani Matice Hrvatske is one of city's significant cultural events and it is commonly sponsored by the Croatian Government and the Government of the Federation of Bosnia and Herzegovina. Mostar Summer is another umbrella event which includes Šantić Poetry Evenings, Mostar Summer Festival, and Festival of Bosnia and Herzegovina choirs/ensembles. The city is home to a music festival named Melodije Mostara (Mostar Melodies), which has been held annually since 1995. Theatre festivals include Mostarska Liska (organized by the National Theatre Mostar) and The Mostar Spring (organized by the Matica hrvatska Mostar).

Mostar art institutions include:

- Croatian Lodge "Herceg Stjepan Kosača"
- Cultural Center Mostar
- OKC Abrašević (English: Abrašević Youth Center)
- Pavarotti Music Centre
- Croatian National Theatre in Mostar
- National Theatre Mostar
- Museum of the Old Bridge
- Herzegovina Museum
- Mostar Youth Theatre
- Aluminij Gallery
- Birthplace of Svetozar Ćorović (Aleksa Šantić House)
- Muslibegović House
- World Music Centre
- Puppet Theatre Mostar

Mostar cuisine is balanced between Western and Eastern influences. Traditional Mostar food is closely related to Turkish, Middle Eastern, and other Mediterranean cuisines. However, due to years of Austrian rule and influence, there are many culinary influences from Central Europe. Some of the dishes include ćevapčići, burek, sarma, japrak, musaka, dolma, sujuk, sač, đuveč, and sataraš. Local desserts include baklava, hurmašice, sutlijaš, tulumbe, tufahije, and šampita.

== Economy ==
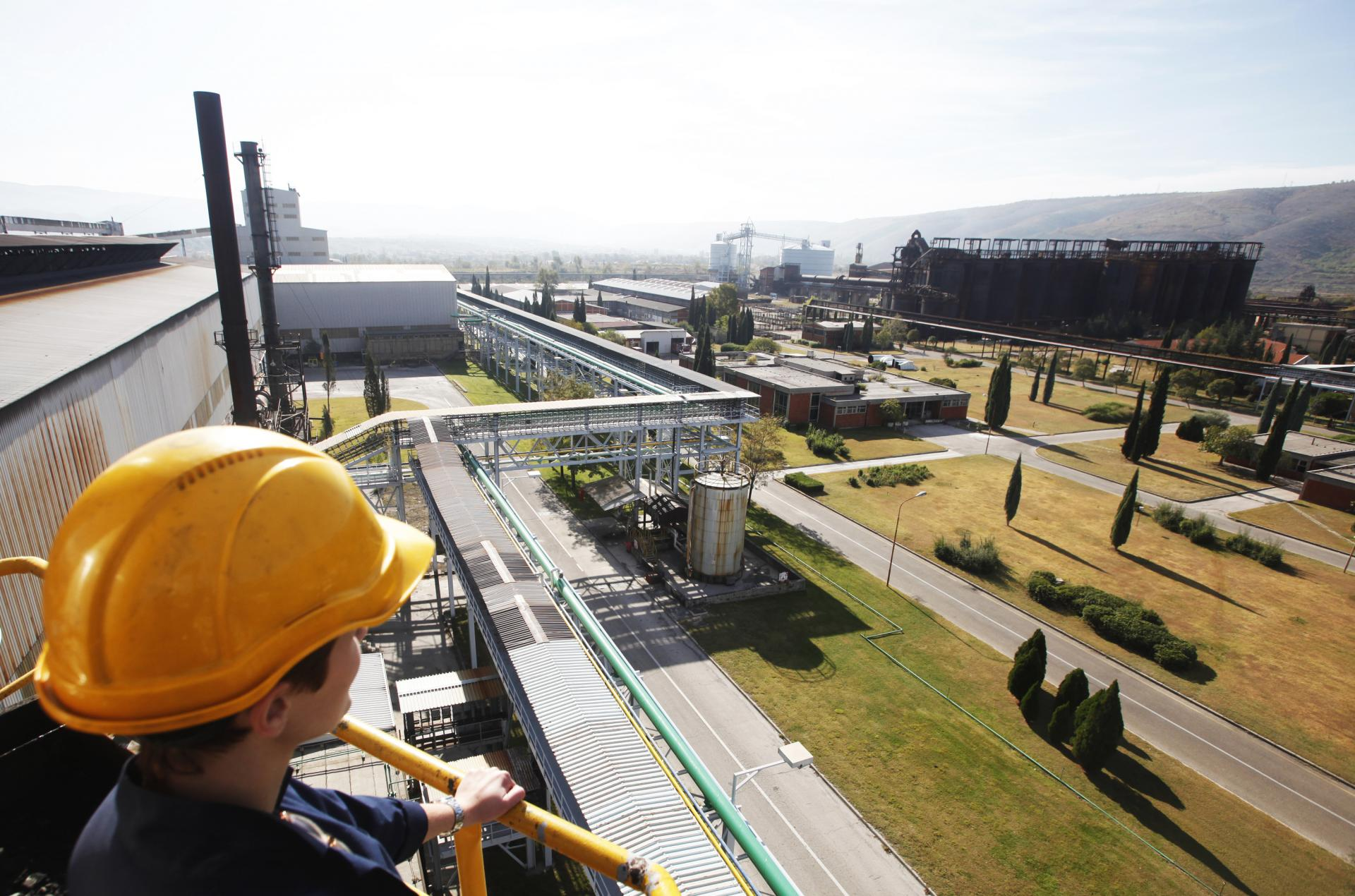
Aluminij factory

Mostar's economy relies heavily on the aluminium & metal industry, banking services & the telecommunication sector. The city is home to some of the country's largest corporations.

Along with Sarajevo & Banja Luka, it is the largest financial center in Bosnia & Herzegovina. One of the three largest banks in the country has its headquarters in Mostar. Bosnia & Herzegovina has three national electric, postal & telecommunication service corporations; the seat of one per each group is placed in Mostar (electric utility provider Elektroprivreda HZHB, postal service company Hrvatska pošta Mostar & HT Eronet, the third largest telecommunication company in the country). These three companies (along with banks & aluminium factory) make a vast portion of the overall economic activity in the city.

Prior to the 1992–1995 Bosnian War, Mostar relied on other important companies that had been closed, damaged, or downsized. They included SOKO (military aircraft factory) & Hepok (food industry). In 1981, Mostar's GDP per capita was 103% of the Yugoslav average.

Aluminum manufacturing company Aluminij Industries is the sole remaining large company that was prominent during the former Yugoslavia. It is one of the country's largest exporter companies & it has a number of international partners. It is one of the most influential companies in the region as well. The city of Mostar alone has direct income of €40 million annually from Aluminij.

Considering the fact that three dams are situated on the city of Mostar's territory, the city has a solid base for further development of production. There is also an ongoing project for the possible use of wind power & building of windmills. The private sector has seen a notable increase in small & medium enterprises over the past couple of years, contributing to the positive business climate.

Mostar also hosts the annual International Economic Fair Mostar ("Međunarodni sajam gospodarstva Mostar") which was first held in 1997.

== Demographics ==
Historical population
| Year | Pop. | ±% p.a. |
|---|---|---|
| 1948 | 45,419 | — |
| 1953 | 40,559 | −2.24% |
| 1961 | 72,453 | +7.52% |
| 1971 | 89,580 | +2.14% |
| 1981 | 110,371 | +2.11% |
| 1991 | 126,628 | +1.38% |
| 2013 | 105,797 | −0.81% |

In 2013, the municipality had a total population of 105,797 according to the census results, and the city itself had a population of 60,195.

=== Ethnic groups ===
Its population consists of the following ethnic groups: Croats (48.4%); Bosniaks (44.1%) and Serbs (4.1%). The city of Mostar has the largest population of Croats in Bosnia and Herzegovina. As in many other cities, its demographic profile was significantly altered after the Bosnian War.

According to the official data of the local elections of 2008, among six city election districts, three western ones (Croat-majority) had 53,917 registered voters, and those three in the east (Bosniak-majority) had 34,712 voters.

The ethnic composition of the city of Mostar, per the indicated census years:

| Ethnic group | 1910 | 1931 | 1948 | 1961 | 1971 | 1981 | 1991 | 2013 |
|---|---|---|---|---|---|---|---|---|
| Bosniaks/Muslims | 7,212 | 8,844 | 9,981 | 10,513 | 33,645 | 34,247 | 43,856 | 46,752 |
| Croats | 4,307 | 5,764 | 6,062 | 27,265 | 32,782 | 36,927 | 43,037 | 51,216 |
| Serbs | 4,518 | 5.502 | 5,039 | 21,220 | 19,076 | 20,271 | 23,846 | 4,421 |
| Yugoslavs | | | | 12,181 | 2,329 | 17,143 | 12,768 | 83 |
| Others | 355 | 185 | 332 | 1,274 | 1,748 | 1,789 | 3,121 | 3,408 |
| Total | 16,392 | 20,295 | 21,606 | 72,453 | 89,580 | 110,377 | 126,628 | 105,797 |

=== Settlements and neighbourhoods ===
The City of Mostar (aside from the city proper) includes the following settlements:

- Bačevići
- Banjdol
- Blagaj
- Bogodol
- Buna
- Cim
- Čule
- Dobrč
- Donja Drežnica
- Donji Jasenjani
- Dračevice
- Gnojnice
- Goranci
- Gornja Drežnica
- Gornje Gnojnice
- Gornji Jasenjani
- Gubavica
- Hodbina
- Humilišani
- Ilići
- Jasenica
- Kosor
- Kremenac
- Krivodol
- Kružanj
- Kutilivač
- Lakševine
- Malo Polje
- Miljkovići
- Ortiješ
- Pijesci
- Podgorani
- Podgorje
- Podvelež
- Polog
- Potoci
- Prigrađani
- Rabina
- Raška Gora
- Raštani
- Ravni
- Rodoč
- Selište
- Slipčići
- Sovići
- Sretnice
- Striževo
- Vihovići
- Vojno
- Vranjevići
- Vrapčići
- Vrdi
- Željuša
- Žitomislići
- Žulja

After the Bosnian War, following the Dayton Agreement, the villages of Kamena, Kokorina, and Zijemlje were separated from Mostar to form the new municipality of Istočni Mostar (East Mostar), in the Republika Srpska.

== Climate ==
Mostar, and the Herzegovina area in general, experience a humid subtropical climate (Cfa) under the Köppen climate classification, with cool, humid winters and hot, drier summers. In the summer months, occasional temperatures above 40 °C (104 °F) are not uncommon. In 1901, a temperature of 46.2 °C (115.2 °F) was measured in the city, which is the highest temperature to have ever been recorded in Bosnia and Herzegovina. The coldest month is January, averaging about 5 °C (41 °F), and the warmest month is July, averaging about 26 °C (78 °F). The sunniest months are between June and September. The remainder of the year is wet and mild. Mostar is the sunniest city in the country with an average of 2431 solar hours a year. Snow is relatively rare, and it usually melts within a few hours or days.

During the 2012 European cold wave, Mostar experienced unusually cold weather with freezing temperatures lasting for days and a record snow depth of 82.5 cm (32 in). On average, the city sees 17 freezing nights a year.

Climate data for Mostar (1991–2020, extremes 1893–present)
| Month | Jan | Feb | Mar | Apr | May | Jun | Jul | Aug | Sep | Oct | Nov | Dec | Year |
|---|---|---|---|---|---|---|---|---|---|---|---|---|---|
| Record high °C (°F) | 20.0 (68.0) | 25.0 (77.0) | 27.6 (81.7) | 31.6 (88.9) | 35.6 (96.1) | 41.2 (106.2) | 46.2 (115.2) | 43.1 (109.6) | 39.4 (102.9) | 32.5 (90.5) | 27.4 (81.3) | 19.8 (67.6) | 46.2 (115.2) |
| Mean daily maximum °C (°F) | 9.3 (48.7) | 11.6 (52.9) | 15.8 (60.4) | 20.1 (68.2) | 25.1 (77.2) | 29.8 (85.6) | 33.0 (91.4) | 33.5 (92.3) | 27.2 (81.0) | 21.5 (70.7) | 15.1 (59.2) | 10.1 (50.2) | 21.0 (69.8) |
| Daily mean °C (°F) | 5.9 (42.6) | 7.2 (45.0) | 10.4 (50.7) | 14.1 (57.4) | 19.0 (66.2) | 23.1 (73.6) | 26.3 (79.3) | 26.0 (78.8) | 20.7 (69.3) | 15.7 (60.3) | 10.6 (51.1) | 6.6 (43.9) | 15.5 (59.9) |
| Mean daily minimum °C (°F) | 2.7 (36.9) | 3.4 (38.1) | 6.2 (43.2) | 9.3 (48.7) | 13.5 (56.3) | 17.4 (63.3) | 20.0 (68.0) | 20.3 (68.5) | 15.8 (60.4) | 11.7 (53.1) | 7.5 (45.5) | 3.9 (39.0) | 11.0 (51.8) |
| Record low °C (°F) | −13.0 (8.6) | −9.6 (14.7) | −6.5 (20.3) | −1.2 (29.8) | 3.3 (37.9) | 8.0 (46.4) | 8.4 (47.1) | 9.6 (49.3) | 6.4 (43.5) | −0.1 (31.8) | −4.8 (23.4) | −7.8 (18.0) | −13.0 (8.6) |
| Average precipitation mm (inches) | 142.3 (5.60) | 125.3 (4.93) | 118.8 (4.68) | 122.8 (4.83) | 92.6 (3.65) | 70.6 (2.78) | 55.9 (2.20) | 58.1 (2.29) | 137.2 (5.40) | 151.0 (5.94) | 188.8 (7.43) | 181.4 (7.14) | 1,445 (56.89) |
| Average precipitation days (≥ 1 mm) | 9.5 | 8.8 | 9.0 | 9.9 | 8.6 | 6.6 | 4.6 | 4.8 | 7.2 | 8.5 | 10.9 | 10.8 | 99.2 |
| Average snowy days (≥ 1.0 cm) | 2.9 | 1.5 | 0.6 | 0.0 | 0.0 | 0.0 | 0.0 | 0.0 | 0.0 | 0.0 | 0.1 | 1.2 | 6.3 |
| Average relative humidity (%) | 64.7 | 60.4 | 59.1 | 61.8 | 61.9 | 59.6 | 54.2 | 55.3 | 62.1 | 67.9 | 70.6 | 66.4 | 62.0 |
| Mean monthly sunshine hours | 123.0 | 127.9 | 171.7 | 190.5 | 247.5 | 287.4 | 333.8 | 313.3 | 225.2 | 177.6 | 115.1 | 118.1 | 2,431.1 |
| Percentage possible sunshine | 43 | 43 | 46 | 47 | 54 | 62 | 71 | 73 | 60 | 52 | 40 | 42 | 55 |
Source 1: NOAA
Source 2: Meteorological Institute of Bosnia and Herzegovina (snow days 1961-1990), altervista.org

== Administration ==
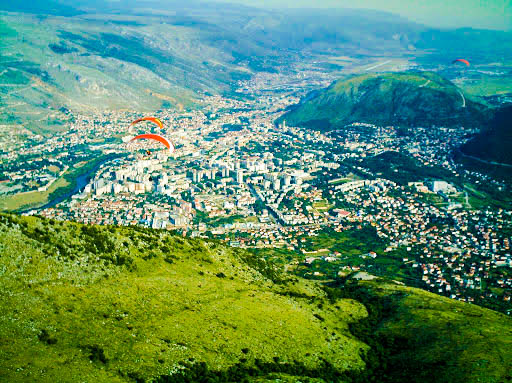
Panoramic view of Mostar

The City of Mostar has the status of a city. The current mayor of Mostar is Mario Kordić (HDZ BiH) and the Mostar City Council consists of 35 seats.

=== Interim Statute (1996–2004) ===
International reconstruction efforts aimed at the reunification of the divided city. The February 1996 Mostar Agreement led to the adoption of the Interim Statute of the city the same month and to 1 year of EU Administration of Mostar (EUAM), headed by former Bremen mayor Hans Koschnick, till early 1997.

The Interim Statute introduced a Yugoslav-style two-level administration, with a City level with its own council and mayor (with two deputies) and six municipalities, each with its own administration and council, reflecting the wartime division: three in the Croat-majority West Mostar, and three in the Bosniak-majority East Mostar. A tiny "Central Zone" strip (not a municipality) was to host the rebuilt institutions of the city and, according to the original plans, also of the Federation entity. Mostar citizens would cast three votes: the first two for the City council's 48 members (half from a city-wide list and half from candidates in each municipality, 4 each), and the third to elect the members of the councils of the six municipalities. Ethnic quotas and veto rights were to prevent any domination.

=== 2004 Statute ===
After six years of implementation, in 2003, OHR Paddy Ashdown established an "international commission for reforming Mostar", whose final report noted how the HDZ/SDA power-sharing in Mostar had entrenched division and corruption, with "rampant parallelism" in administrative structures and usurpation of power by the municipalities over the City. The Mostar Commission, headed by another former German mayor, Norbert Winterstein, gathered members of all Mostar parties with the overarching aim of reuniting the city. A new Statute was negotiated, although a few points of contention remained. Finally, in February 2004, OHR Paddy Ashdown imposed via its Bonn Powers the new City Statute and related amendments to the BiH Election Law and cantonal and Federation Constitutions. The 2004 Statute abolished the six municipalities and created a unified City administration with a single budget and one Mayor of Mostar, with no deputies. Minimum/maximum thresholds replaced ethnic quotas in the City council; 17 councillors would now be elected from a city-wide list, and 18 from the territories of the six former municipalities, now "city areas", which retained a single residual competence on "the distribution of revenues deriving from allocated construction land", managed by city area "commissions" formed by the 3 city councillors elected in each one. The "central zone" remained outside any city area, and its residents were only entitled to vote for the city-wide list.

According to the City Statute, imposed by High Representative Paddy Ashdown on 28 January 2004 after local politicians failed to reach an agreement, the mayor of Mostar has to be elected by the city council with a two-thirds majority. Ashdown abolished the six municipalities that were divided equally among Bosniaks and Croats and replaced them with six electoral units, ridding Mostar of duplicate institutions and costs. In the process Ashdown also reduced the number of elected officials from 194 to 35. According to the City Statute, the constituent peoples of Bosnia and Herzegovina (Bosniaks, Croats, and Serbs) are guaranteed a minimum of four seats and a maximum of 15 seats. 18 councillors are elected by election units (3 councillors from each of the 6 districts) and 15 councillors from a city-wide list. This move was opposed by the Party of Democratic Action (SDA) and the Croatian Democratic Union of Bosnia and Herzegovina (HDZ BiH).

=== 2008 elections ===
On the basis of the 2008 election, the City Council was composed of 35 councillors from the following parties:

- Party of Democratic Action (SDA) 12
- People's Party Work for Prosperity (NSRzB) 7
- Croatian Democratic Union of Bosnia and Herzegovina (HDZ BiH) 7
- Social Democratic Party of Bosnia and Herzegovina (SDP BiH) 3
- Croatian Democratic Union 1990 (HDZ 1990) 3
- Party for Bosnia and Herzegovina (SBiH) 2
- Croatian Party of Rights of Bosnia and Herzegovina (HSP BiH) 1

Relative winners were SDA with the greatest number of votes. However, neither party had enough votes to ensure the election of the mayor from their party. The City Council met 16 times without success. Eventually, OHR was involved, and the High Representative made some minor changes to the City Statute. After that, Ljubo Bešlić (HDZ BiH) was reelected as a mayor.

=== 2010 Constitutional Court ruling ===
Following an appeal by HDZ BiH, in November 2010 the Constitutional Court found the electoral framework for Mostar (2004 Statute) to be discriminatory and unconstitutional. Among other things, the Constitutional Court noted that the votes of Mostar residents did not count the same, as the six electoral zones all elected 3 councillors despite their different population (with the smallest having 4 times fewer residents than the largest); and that the voters from the "central zone" counted less, as they only elected representatives from the city-wide list and not from any of the electoral zones. The Court annulled the relevant provisions of the Election Law of BiH and of the 2004 Statute, and ordered the Parliamentary Assembly of BiH and the Mostar city assembly to revise them within six months. Yet, the Bosniak and Croat ruling parties did not reach a compromise.

=== Interim administration (2012–2020) ===
In the absence of a legal basis, local elections could not take place in Mostar in 2012 and 2016. The mandate of the City Council also expired in 2012. Bešlić thus remained as acting mayor for eight additional years, during which he affirmed that he considered resigning multiple times, also due to his deteriorating health. During this time, he shared the administrative duties with Izet Šahović, head of the Mostar City's Finance Department, a bureaucrat and member of the Bosniak Party of Democratic Action (SDA). For two full mandates, Bešlić and Šahović have decided together how to disburse Mostar's yearly 30 million euro budget, without any legislative oversight or public transparency. The situation has been denounced by multiple NGOs, which have pointed to the SDA-HDZ power-sharing as the source of the maladministration of Mostar and the recurrent problems with trash collection, water treatment, and continued ethnic duplication of the city services.

During this period, several rounds of talks were held with international facilitation. Between October 2012 and May 2013, Deputy High Representative Roderick W. Moore launched an 8-month mediation effort that produced a compromise framework aimed at merging the city areas (and central zone) into multi-ethnic voting districts. This was endorsed by the Peace Implementation Council's Steering Board (PIC SB). Yet, the proposal found no political support when it was submitted by Moore's successor Tamir G. Waser in July 2014 to the BiH Parliament. A second mediation attempt led by US and UK ambassadors to BiH, Maureen Cormack and Edward Ferguson, and based on a model with a single city-wide electoral district, also failed [in 2017]. In 2018, the two main parties, HDZ BiH and SDA, autonomously negotiated a compromise solution, based only on a formula for the election of the councillors from each city area along the "one man, one vote" principle, which would be later taken up in the June 2020 agreement.

In October 2019, the European Court of Human Rights ruled against Bosnia and Herzegovina in the case brought by Irma Baralija on the absence of electoral rights for the residents of Mostar. In July 2020, the Parliament of Bosnia and Herzegovina amended the electoral law to allow for local elections in Mostar to be held in December 2020.

=== City Council ===
The current composition of the Mostar City Council is:

| Groups | Councilors per group |
| HDZ BiH | 15 / 35 |
| SDA–BPS–BH Zeleni | 10 / 35 |
| HRS | 3 / 35 |
| DF–NES–SBiH–PMP | 3 / 35 |
| Trojka | 2 / 35 |
| HDZ 1990 | 1 / 35 |
| Croatian List for the South | 1 / 35 |

=== List of mayors of the City of Mostar ===
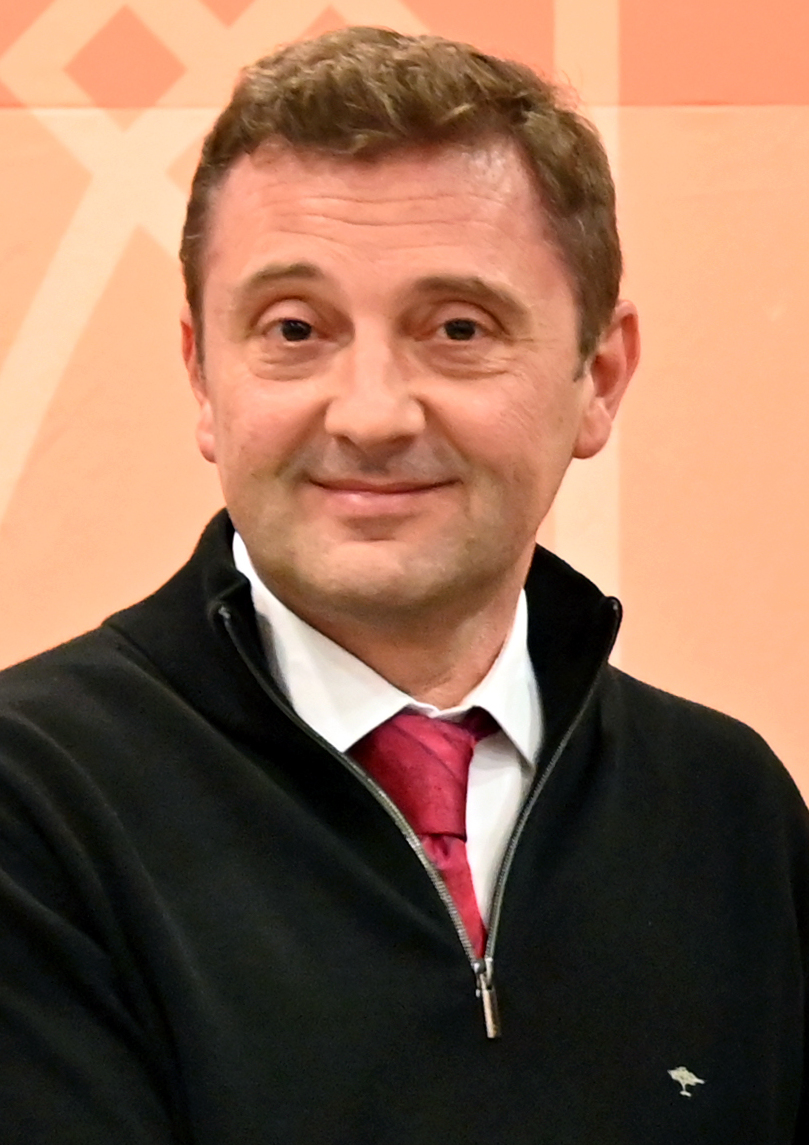
Mario Kordić, the current mayor of Mostar

| # | Portrait | Name | Term of Office | | Party |
|---|---|---|---|---|---|
| 1 | | President Ismail and members Muhamed, Ahmed, Huršid, Javer, Jure, Ivan, Lazar | 1871 | 1878 | |
| 2 | | Muhamed-beg Alajbegović (Deputy: Blaško Zelenika) | 6 August 1878 | May 1890 | |
| 3 | | Ibrahim-beg Kapetanović | January 1890 | 6 January 1897 | |
| 4 | | Ahmet-beg Hadžiomerović | June 1897 | December 1907 | |
| 5 | | Mustafa Mujaga Komadina | 1909 | 2 November 1918 | |
| 6 | | Smail-aga Ćemalović | 1919 | 1929 | |
| 7 | | Ibrahim Fejić (Sub-mayors: Ljubo Krulj and Vlatko Tambić) | 1929 | 1934 | |
| 8 | | Muhamed Ridžanović | 1935 | 1935 | |
| 9 | | Husaga Ćišić | 1935 | 1940 | |
| 10 | | Husein Metiljević | 1940 | 1941 | |
| 11 | | Šefkija Balić | 1941 | 1941 | |
| 12 | | Muhamed Butum | 1941 | 1942 | |
| 13 | | Salih Efica "Crni" | 1942 | 1945 | |
| 14 | | Salko Fejić | 1945 | 1946 | |
| 15 | | Vilko Šnatinger | 1946 | 1947 | |
| 16 | | Manojlo Ćabak | 1947 | 1949 | |
| 17 | | Mustafa Sefo | 1949 | March 1958 | |
| 18 | | Vaso Gačić | August 1958 | October 1961 | |
| 19 | | Dušan Vukojević | October 1961 | February 1963 | |
| 20 | | Muhamed Mirica | November 1963 | May 1967 | |
| 21 | | Avdo Zvonić | May 1967 | May 1969 | |
| 22 | | Radmilo – Braca Andrić | May 1969 | May 1974 | |
| 23 | | Izet Brković | May 1974 | June 1976 | |
| 24 | | Dževad Derviškadić | June 1976 | April 1982 | |
| 25 | | Vlado Smoljan | April 1982 | July 1983 | |
| 26 | | Nikola Gašić | July 1983 | July 1985 | |
| 27 | | Damjan Rotim | July 1985 | April 1986 | |
| 28 | | Nijaz Topuzović "Toza" | April 1986 | April 1988 | |
| 29 | | Jovo Popara | 14 December 1988 | 14 December 1990 | |
| 30 | | Milivoj Gagro | 14 December 1990 | 1992 | HDZ BiH |
| 31 | | Mijo Brajković; Safet Oručević | 1992 | 1996 | HDZ BiH; SDA |
| 32 | | Ivan Prskalo; Deputy: Safet Oručević | 1996 | 2000 | HDZ BiH; SDA |
| 33 | | Neven Tomić; Deputy: Hamdija Jahić | 2000 | December 2004 | HDZ BiH; SDA |
| 34 | | Ljubo Bešlić; Deputy: Hamdija Jahić | December 2004 | 18 December 2009 | HDZ BiH; SDA |
| 35 | | Ljubo Bešlić | 18 December 2009 | 15 February 2021 | HDZ BiH |
| 36 | | Mario Kordić | 15 February 2021 | Incumbent | HDZ BiH |

== Education ==
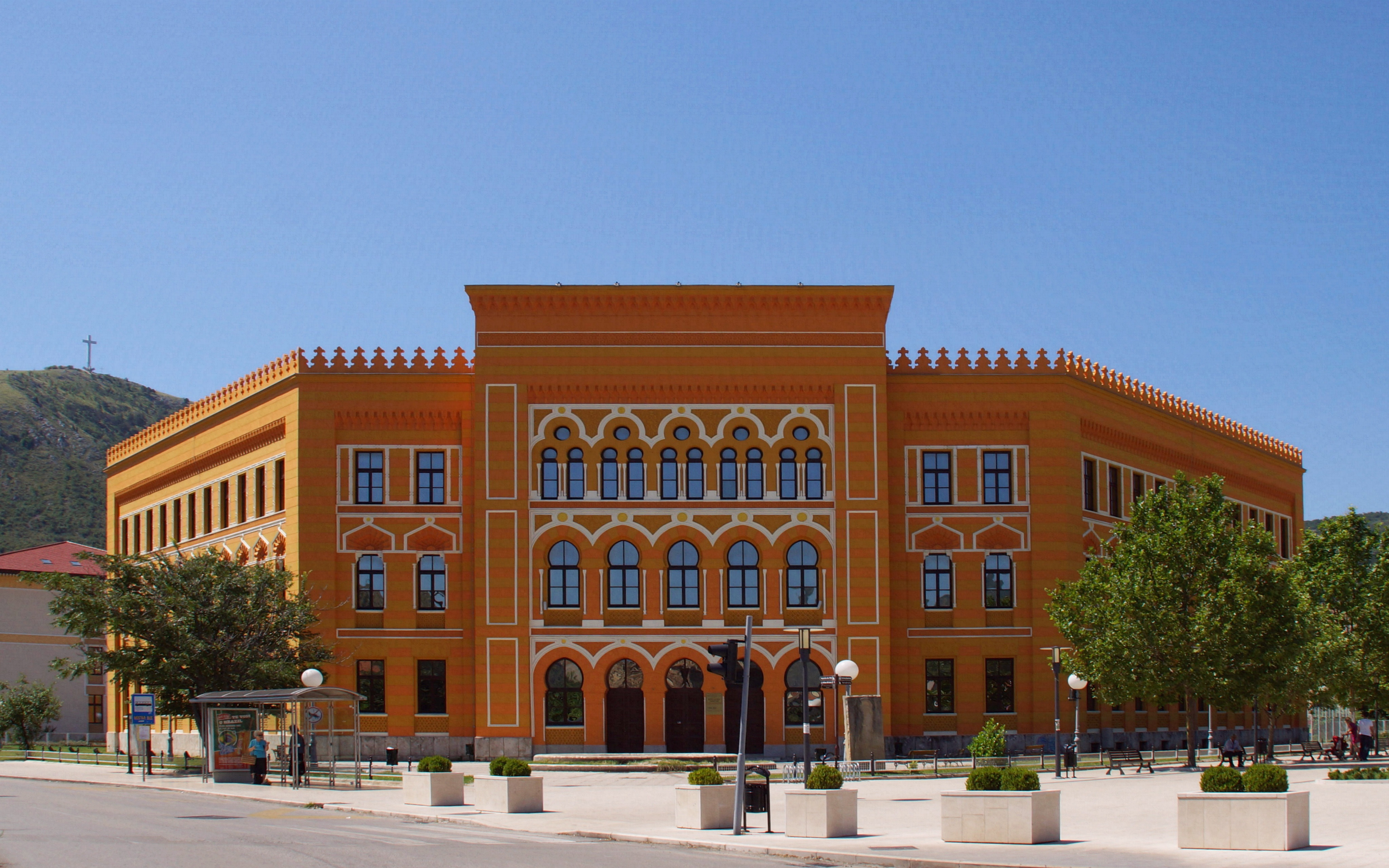
Gymnasium Mostar (built 1898–1902) within United World College

University of Mostar Seal

Mostar has a number of educational institutions. These include University of Mostar, University Džemal Bijedić of Mostar, United World College in Mostar, nineteen high schools, and twenty-four elementary schools. High-schools include sixteen vocational schools and three gymnasiums.

All public schools in Mostar, both elementary and secondary education, are divided between the Croat curriculum and the Federal (unofficially Bosniak) curriculum. This ethnic division of schools was emplaced during the very first year of the Bosnian war, and it continues, with some modifications, to this day. Today, the schools in Mostar and throughout Bosnia and Herzegovina are a site of struggle between ethno-national political elites in ways that reveals the precarious position of youth in the volatile nation building processes A partial exception to divided education is Gimnazija Mostar (also known as "Stara gimnazija") that implemented joint school administration and some joint student courses. However, Croat and Bosniak students in Gimnazija Mostar continue to have most courses according to the "national" curriculum, among them the so-called national subjects – history, literature, geography, and religion.

The country's higher education reform and the signing of the Bologna Process have forced both universities to put aside their rivalry to some extent and try to make themselves more competitive on a regional level.

University of Mostar is the second largest university in the country and the only Croatian language university in Bosnia and Herzegovina. It was founded in 1977 as the University "Džemal Bijedić" of Mostar, but changed its name in 1992. The origin of the university can be traced back to the Herzegovina Franciscan Theological School, which was founded in 1895 and closed in 1945, was the first higher education institution in Mostar. Today's University seal shows the building of the Franciscan Monastery.

University Džemal Bijedić of Mostar was founded in 1993. It employs around 250 professors and staff members. According to the Federal Office of Statistics, Džemal Bijedić University had 2,522 students enrolled during the 2012/2013 academic year.

As of 2015 school year, the University of Mostar had 10,712 students enrolled at eleven faculties, making it the largest university in the city. Cumulatively, it has been attended by more than 40,000 students since the start of the Bologna process of education.

== Sports ==
One of the most popular sports in Mostar is football. The two most successful teams are HŠK Zrinjski and FK Velež. FK Velež won the Yugoslav Cup in 1981 and in 1986, which was one of the most significant accomplishments this club has achieved. Since the Bosnian War, each club has generally been supported by a particular ethnic group (Velež for the Bosniaks and Zrinjski for the Croats). The matches between the two clubs are some of the country's most intense matches. Since the start of the Premier League of Bosnia and Herzegovina, HŠK Zrinjski has won nine championships.

In basketball, HKK Zrinjski Mostar competes at the nation's highest level while the Zrinjski banner also represents the city in the top handball league. Vahid Halilhodžić, a former Bosnian football player and current manager of the Morocco national football team, started his professional career in FK Velež Mostar.

In 2011, rugby union football club RK Herceg was founded. The club competes in national leagues within Bosnia & Herzegovina and in the regional league Adria Sevens.

Another popular sport in Mostar is swimming. There are three swimming teams in Mostar: PK Velež, KVS Orka, and APK Zrinjski. The best Bosnian-Herzegovinian swimmer, Lana Pudar, is from Mostar. Mostar has plenty of talented swimmers despite having just one 25-meter pool and one 12.5-meter pool.

In mountaineering, the local HPS chapter was called HPD "Prenj". It was liquidated on 20 January 1939.

== Transport ==
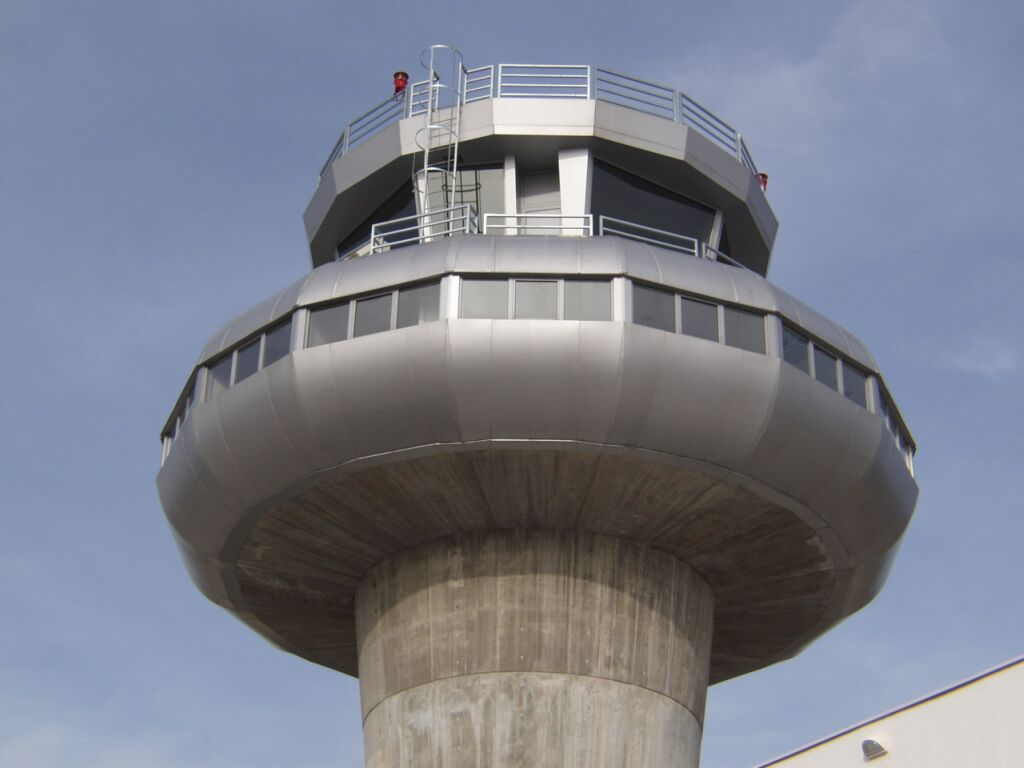
Mostar International Airport

=== Rail ===
The city is served by Mostar railway station, with rail connections to the capital, Sarajevo, and cross-border traffic with Croatia. The railway line between Sarajevo and Mostar runs through the Neretva River valley. It is often described as one of the most scenic railway routes in the region due to its natural surroundings and engineering features.

=== Air ===
Mostar is an important tourist destination in Bosnia and Herzegovina. The city is served by Mostar International Airport, which has undergone continuous development and has recorded steady growth in passenger numbers in recent years. The airport offers direct flights to several major European destinations and plays an increasingly important role in connecting the city with international markets.

== Tourism ==
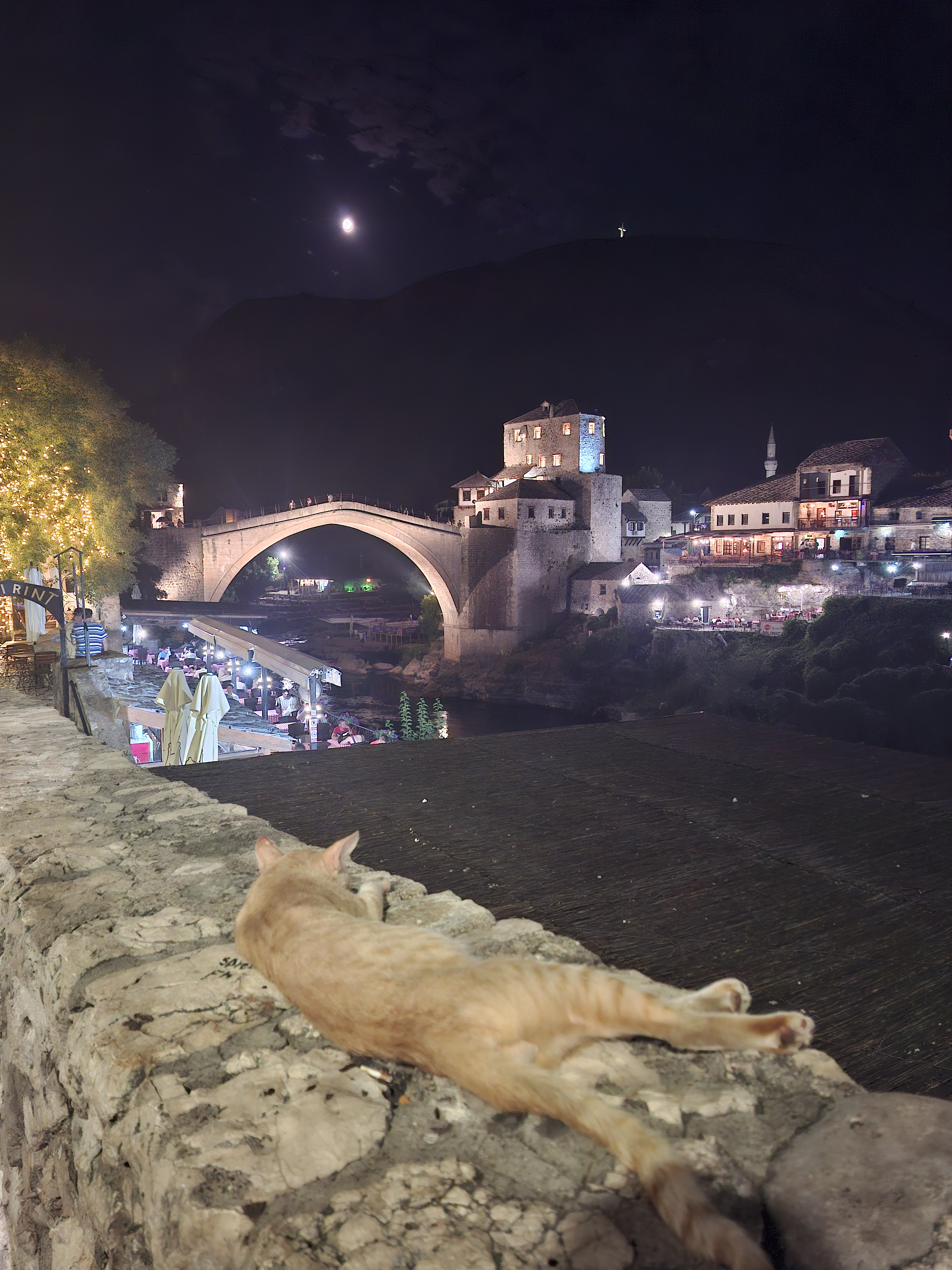
A cat in the old town with the Stari Most and Millennium Cross in the background

Mostar is one of the most important cultural and tourist centres in southern Bosnia and Herzegovina, serving as a regional hub of historical, religious, and architectural heritage shaped by centuries of diverse cultural influences.

Some noteworthy sites include the Bishop's Ordinariate building, the remains of an early Christian basilica at Cim, a hamam (Ottoman public bath), the clock tower (sahat-kula), the Synagogue (1889) and the Jewish Memorial Cemetery, the Nesuh-aga Vučjaković Mosque, the Hadži-Kurt Mosque (Tabačica), the Metropolitan's Palace (1908), the Karagöz Bey Mosque (1557), the Cathedral of the Holy Trinity (1873), the Catholic Church and Franciscan Monastery, Ottoman residences dating from the 16th to the 19th century, the Crooked Bridge, and the Tara and Halebija Towers.

The World War II Partisan Memorial Cemetery in Mostar, designed by architect Bogdan Bogdanović, is an important symbol of the city and a notable example of modernist memorial architecture. The monument integrates architectural expression with natural elements such as water and greenery, and was inscribed on the list of National Monuments in 2006.

Numerous significant cultural, historical, and natural sites are located in the surrounding region, further reinforcing Mostar’s role as a regional cultural centre. These include the Catholic pilgrimage site of Međugorje, the Tekija Dervish Monastery in Blagaj, the 13th-century town of Počitelj, Blagaj Fortress (Stjepan-grad), the Kravica waterfall, the seaside town of Neum, the Roman villa rustica from the early fourth century at Mogorjelo, Stolac with its stećak necropolis, and the remains of the ancient city of Daorson. Nearby sites also include Hutovo Blato Nature Park, the archaeological site of Desilo, Lake Boračko, and Vjetrenica Cave, the largest and most significant cave in Bosnia and Herzegovina.

== Notable people ==
- Tea Alagic, Bosnian-American theatre director
- Leo Ajkic, Norwegian TV host
- Dušan Bajević, footballer
- Dervish Pasha Bajezidagić, official and poet
- Sergej Barbarez, footballer
- Bojan Bogdanović, basketball player
- Svetozar Ćorović, writer
- Vladimir Ćorović, historian
- Ivan Ćurković, footballer
- Dražen Dalipagić, basketball player, Olympic champion
- Dejan Damjanović, footballer
- Radomir Damnjanović Damnjan, Serbian-Italian painter and conceptual artist
- Osman Đikić, poet
- Franjo Džidić, footballer
- Ibrahim Fejić, Grand Mufti of Yugoslavia (1947 to 1957)
- Amina Kajtaz, swimmer
- Meho Kodro, footballer
- Mladen Kolobarić, graphic artist who designed the current flag of Bosnia and Herzegovina
- Zoran Mandlbaum, leader of the Jewish Community of Mostar
- Enver Marić, footballer
- Marino Marić, handball player
- Predrag Matvejević, writer
- Ćamila Mičijević, handball player
- Florijan Mićković, sculptor
- Gordan Mihić, playwright
- Ahmed Rushdi Mostari, poet
- Fevzi Mostari, writer
- Vlado Mrkić, writer and journalist
- Muhamed Mujić, footballer, Olympic medalist
- Dragi Sestic, music producer
- Saša Papac, footballer
- Boro Primorac, footballer
- Lana Pudar, swimmer
- Nino Raspudić, philosopher
- Ismet Rizvić, painter
- Dženan Salković, singer and songwriter
- Željko Samardžić, singer
- Aleksa Šantić, writer
- Marin Šego, handball player
- Blaž Slišković, footballer
- Arif Smajkić, medical researcher and academic
- Branka Sovrlić, singer
- Jasmin Spahić, retired Bosnian footballer
- Velibor Topić, British-Bosnian actor and voice actor
- Sergej Trifunović, actor
- Ornela Vištica, actress
- Franjo Vladić, footballer
- Hasan Ziyayi, poet
- Mija Martina, singer

== Twin towns – sister cities ==
Mostar is twinned with:

- Amman, Jordan
- Antalya, Turkey
- Arsoli, Italy
- Bassano del Grappa, Italy
- Isfahan, Iran
- İzmir, Turkey
- Heidelberg, Germany
- Kaposvár, Hungary
- Kayseri, Turkey
- Kragujevac, Serbia
- Millau, France
- Montegrotto Terme, Italy
- Ohrid, North Macedonia
- Orkland, Norway
- Osijek, Croatia
- Split, Croatia
- Tutin, Serbia
- Vejle, Denmark
- Virovitica, Croatia
- Vukovar, Croatia
- Yinchuan, China

== See also ==
- Architecture of Bosnia and Herzegovina
- Moorish Revival architecture in Bosnia and Herzegovina
- List of National Monuments of Bosnia and Herzegovina
- List of World Heritage Sites in Bosnia and Herzegovina
- List of Museums in Bosnia and Herzegovina
- Tourism in Bosnia and Herzegovina
- Radiotelevizija Herceg-Bosne
