= Hasan Ziyayi =

Poet

Hasan Ziyayi, also known as Ziyayi Chelebi (died 1585), was a Bosnian poet who wrote in Persian and Turkish. He was one of the earliest and most talented Bosnian divan poets that flourished in the 16th century. Regarding his Persian works; he wrote a qasida and fourteen ghazals as well as a qet'a. He dedicated his qasida to Persian poets and was well versed in the Persian literary tradition. He hailed from Mostar.
