= Humilišani =

- Village
- Location within Bosnia and Herzegovina
- Coordinates: 43.4709572°N 17.9041095°E
- Country: Bosnia and Herzegovina
- Entity: Federation of Bosnia and Herzegovina
- Canton: Herzegovina-Neretva
- Municipality: City of Mostar

Area
  - Total: 18.38 sq mi (47.60 km^{2})

Population (2013)
  - Total: 1,161
  - Density: 63.17/sq mi (24.39/km^{2})
- Time zone: UTC+1 (CET)
  - Summer (DST): UTC+2 (CEST)

Humilišani is a village in the City of Mostar, Bosnia and Herzegovina.

== Demographics ==
According to the 2013 census, its population was 1,161.

Ethnicity in 2013
Ethnicity	Number	Percentage
Bosniaks	1,034	89.1%
Serbs	105	9.0%
Croats	8	0.7%
other/undeclared	14	1.2%
Total	1,161	100%
