= Gornji Jasenjani =

- Village
- Location within Bosnia and Herzegovina
- Coordinates: 43.5393109°N 17.7355381°E
- Country: Bosnia and Herzegovina
- Entity: Federation of Bosnia and Herzegovina
- Canton: Herzegovina-Neretva
- Municipality: City of Mostar

Area
  - Total: 13.44 sq mi (34.82 km^{2})

Population (2013)
  - Total: 5
  - Density: 0.37/sq mi (0.14/km^{2})
- Time zone: UTC+1 (CET)
  - Summer (DST): UTC+2 (CEST)

Gornji Jasenjani is a village in the City of Mostar, Bosnia and Herzegovina.

== Demographics ==
According to the 2013 census, its population was 5, all Bosniaks.
