= Ravni, Mostar =

Ravni
- Village
- Location within Bosnia and Herzegovina
- Coordinates: 43.5239416°N 17.8183647°E
- Country: Bosnia and Herzegovina
- Entity: Federation of Bosnia and Herzegovina
- Canton: Herzegovina-Neretva
- Municipality: City of Mostar

Area
  - Total: 27.71 sq mi (71.76 km^{2})

Population (2013)
  - Total: 7
  - Density: 0.25/sq mi (0.098/km^{2})
- Time zone: UTC+1 (CET)
  - Summer (DST): UTC+2 (CEST)

Ravni is a village in the City of Mostar, Bosnia and Herzegovina.

== Demographics ==
According to the 2013 census, its population was 7, all Bosniaks.
