= Gubavica =

Village in Bosnia and Herzegovina

- Village
- Location within Bosnia and Herzegovina
- Coordinates: 43°20′N 17°48′E
- Country: Bosnia and Herzegovina
- Entity: Federation of Bosnia and Herzegovina
- Canton: Herzegovina-Neretva
- Municipality: City of Mostar

Area
  - Total: 4.31 sq mi (11.15 km^{2})

Population (2013)
  - Total: 494
  - Density: 115/sq mi (44.3/km^{2})
- Time zone: UTC+1 (CET)
  - Summer (DST): UTC+2 (CEST)

Gubavica is a village in the City of Mostar, Bosnia and Herzegovina.

== Demographics ==
According to the 2013 census, its population was 494.

Ethnicity in 2013
Ethnicity	Number	Percentage
Bosniaks	479	97.0%
Serbs	8	1.6%
Croats	7	1.4%
Total	494	100%
