= Cultural Center Mostar =

Art Institution in Bosnia and Herzegovina

Cultural Center
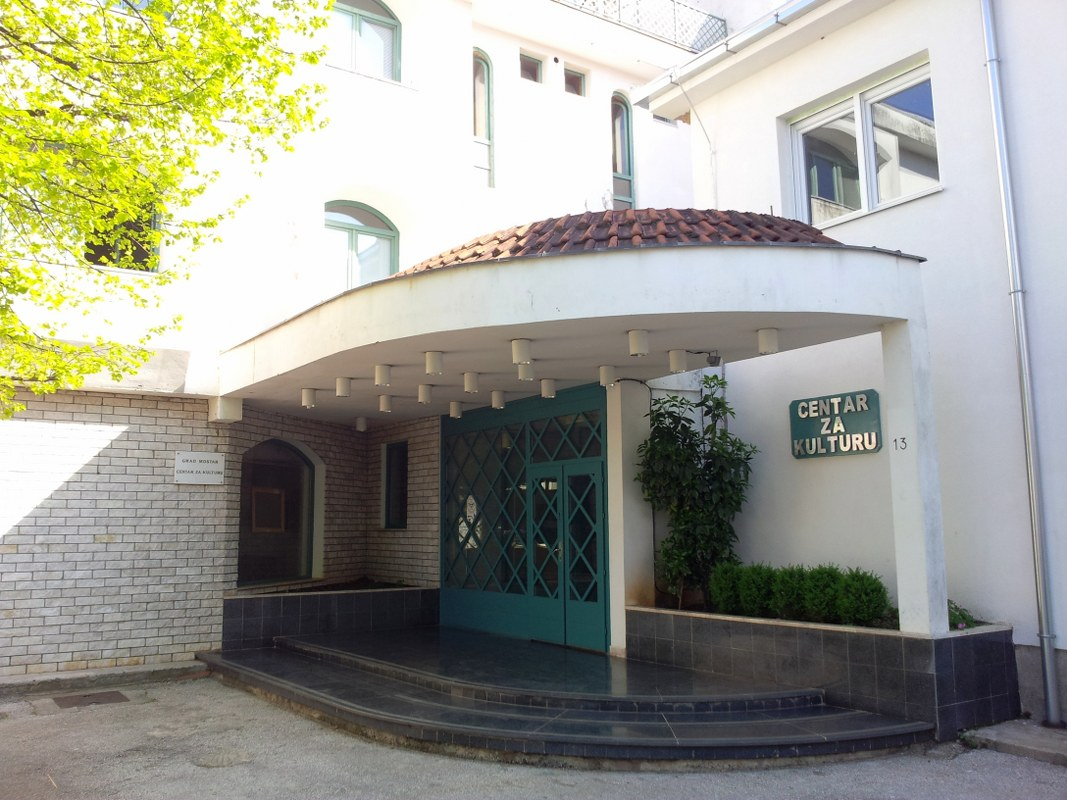
- Entrance to the Cultural Center in Mostar, Bosnia and Herzegovina
- Interactive map of Cultural Center
- Location: Rade Bitange 13, Mostar, Bosnia and Herzegovina
- Coordinates: 43°20′20″N 17°48′39″E
- Operator: Director Senad Suljić

Website
- mostarski.ba

Cultural Centre (Bosnian: Centar za kulturu) is a city-sponsored art institution in Mostar, Bosnia and Herzegovina. During the month of July, the Centre organizes the Mostar Summer Festival (Mostarski Ljetni Festival) that has been held annually for over twenty years. The festival includes various art events such as concerts, theatre performances, puppet-shows, art exhibitions, poetry readings, and book presentations.

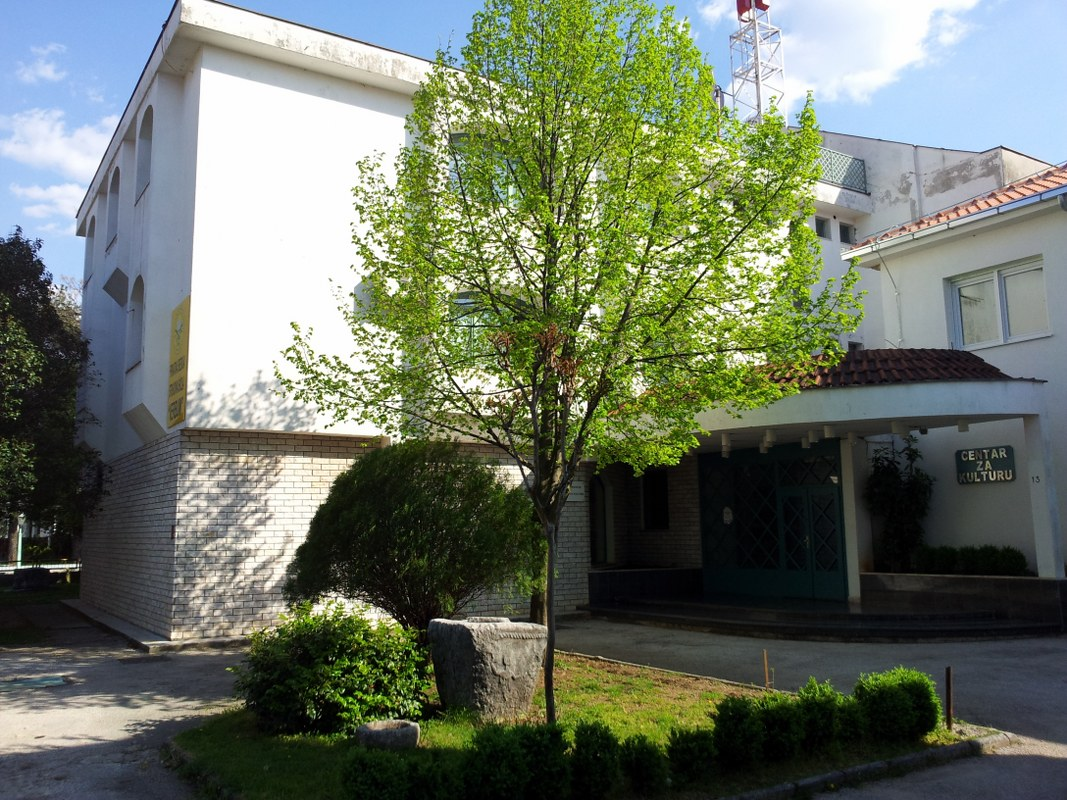
Cultural Center Mostar facade

Cultural Centre's address is Rade Bitange 13 and its phone number is +387 (0)36 580 216.
