= Rabina, Mostar =

Rabina
- Village
- Location within Bosnia and Herzegovina
- Country: Bosnia and Herzegovina
- Entity: Federation of Bosnia and Herzegovina
- Canton: Herzegovina-Neretva
- City: Mostar

Area
  - Total: 9.60 km^{2} (3.71 sq mi)

Population (2013)
  - Total: 21
  - Density: 2.2/km^{2} (5.7/sq mi)
- Time zone: UTC+1 (CET)
  - Summer (DST): UTC+2 (CEST)

Rabina is a village in the City of Mostar in the Herzegovina-Neretva Canton of the Federation of Bosnia and Herzegovina, an entity of Bosnia and Herzegovina.

== Demographics ==
According to the 2013 census, its population was 21, all of them Bosniaks.
