= Lakševine =

- Village
- Location within Bosnia and Herzegovina
- Coordinates: 43.2613303°N 17.8326042°E
- Country: Bosnia and Herzegovina
- Entity: Federation of Bosnia and Herzegovina
- Canton: Herzegovina-Neretva
- Municipality: City of Mostar

Area
  - Total: 0.81 sq mi (2.11 km^{2})

Population (2013)
  - Total: 1,432
  - Density: 1,760/sq mi (679/km^{2})
- Time zone: UTC+1 (CET)
  - Summer (DST): UTC+2 (CEST)

Lakševine is a village in the City of Mostar, Bosnia and Herzegovina.

== Demographics ==
According to the 2013 census, its population was 1,432.

Ethnicity in 2013
Ethnicity	Number	Percentage
Croats	1,299	90.7%
Serbs	93	6.5%
Bosniaks	19	1.3%
other/undeclared	21	1.5%
Total	1,432	100%
