= Vlado Mrkić =

Vlado Mrkić (16 March 1940 – 25 April 2002) was a Bosnian-Herzegovinian writer and journalist. He was born in Mostar in 1940 and graduated from the Philosophy College in Sarajevo. He has worked as a journalist since 1968 and has received a number of journalism awards - most of which he has refused to accept. During the Bosnian war he worked as a war reporter and visited most of former Yugoslavian war fronts.

He is author of three books: "Together Never Again" (original: Nikad Više Zajedno), "Berenika's Hair" (original: Berenikina Kosa) and "East From the West" (original: Istočno od Zapada).
