= Vihovići, Mostar =

Suburb of Mostar, Bosnia and Herzegovina

Vihovići
- Suburb
- Location within Bosnia and Herzegovina
- Coordinates: 43.3800233°N 17.7491316°E
- Country: Bosnia and Herzegovina
- Entity: Federation of Bosnia and Herzegovina
- Canton: Herzegovina-Neretva
- Municipality: City of Mostar

Area
  - Total: 4.05 sq mi (10.49 km^{2})

Population (2013)
  - Total: 1,987
  - Density: 490.6/sq mi (189.4/km^{2})
- Time zone: UTC+1 (CET)
  - Summer (DST): UTC+2 (CEST)

Vihovići is a suburban neighborhood of Mostar, Bosnia and Herzegovina.

== Demographics ==
According to the 2013 census, its population was 1,987.

Ethnicity in 2013
| Ethnicity | Number | Percentage |
|---|---|---|
| Croats | 1,931 | 97.2% |
| Serbs | 33 | 1.7% |
| other/undeclared | 23 | 1.2% |
| Total | 1,987 | 100% |
