= Željuša, Mostar =

Željuša
- Village
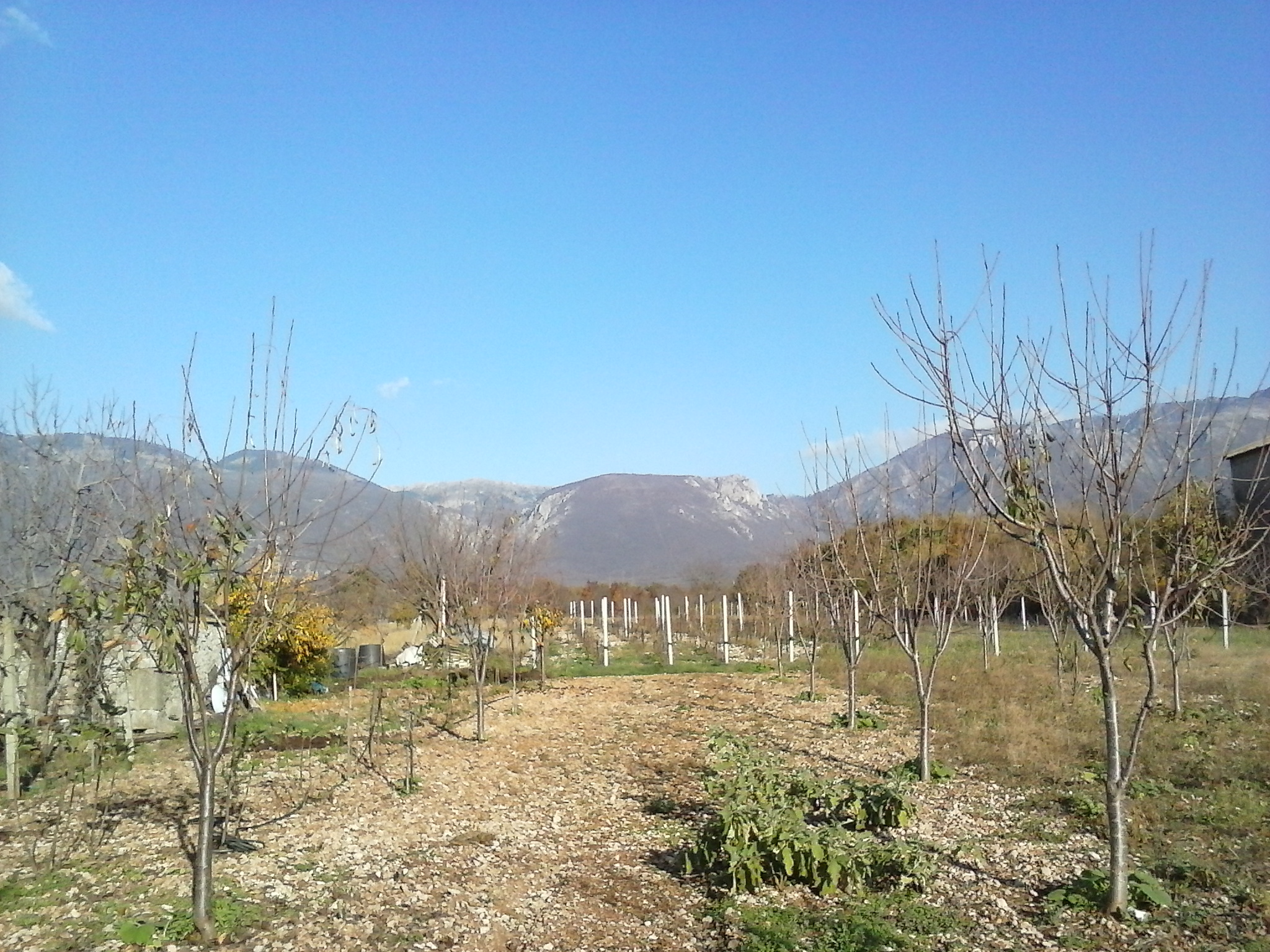
- Zeljusa

- Location within Bosnia and Herzegovina
- Coordinates: 43.4347188°N 17.8551005°E
- Country: Bosnia and Herzegovina
- Entity: Federation of Bosnia and Herzegovina
- Canton: Herzegovina-Neretva
- Municipality: City of Mostar

Area
  - Total: 1.93 sq mi (5.00 km^{2})

Population (2013)
  - Total: 451
  - Density: 234/sq mi (90.2/km^{2})
- Time zone: UTC+1 (CET)
  - Summer (DST): UTC+2 (CEST)

Željuša is a village in the City of Mostar, Bosnia and Herzegovina.

== Demographics ==
According to the 2013 census, its population was 451.

Ethnicity in 2013
Ethnicity	Number	Percentage
Serbs	261	57.9%
Bosniaks	179	39.7%
Croats	2	0.4%
other/undeclared	9	2.0%
Total	451	100%
