= Residential complex on Džidžikovac =

Residential complex architectural ensemble, in Sarajevo

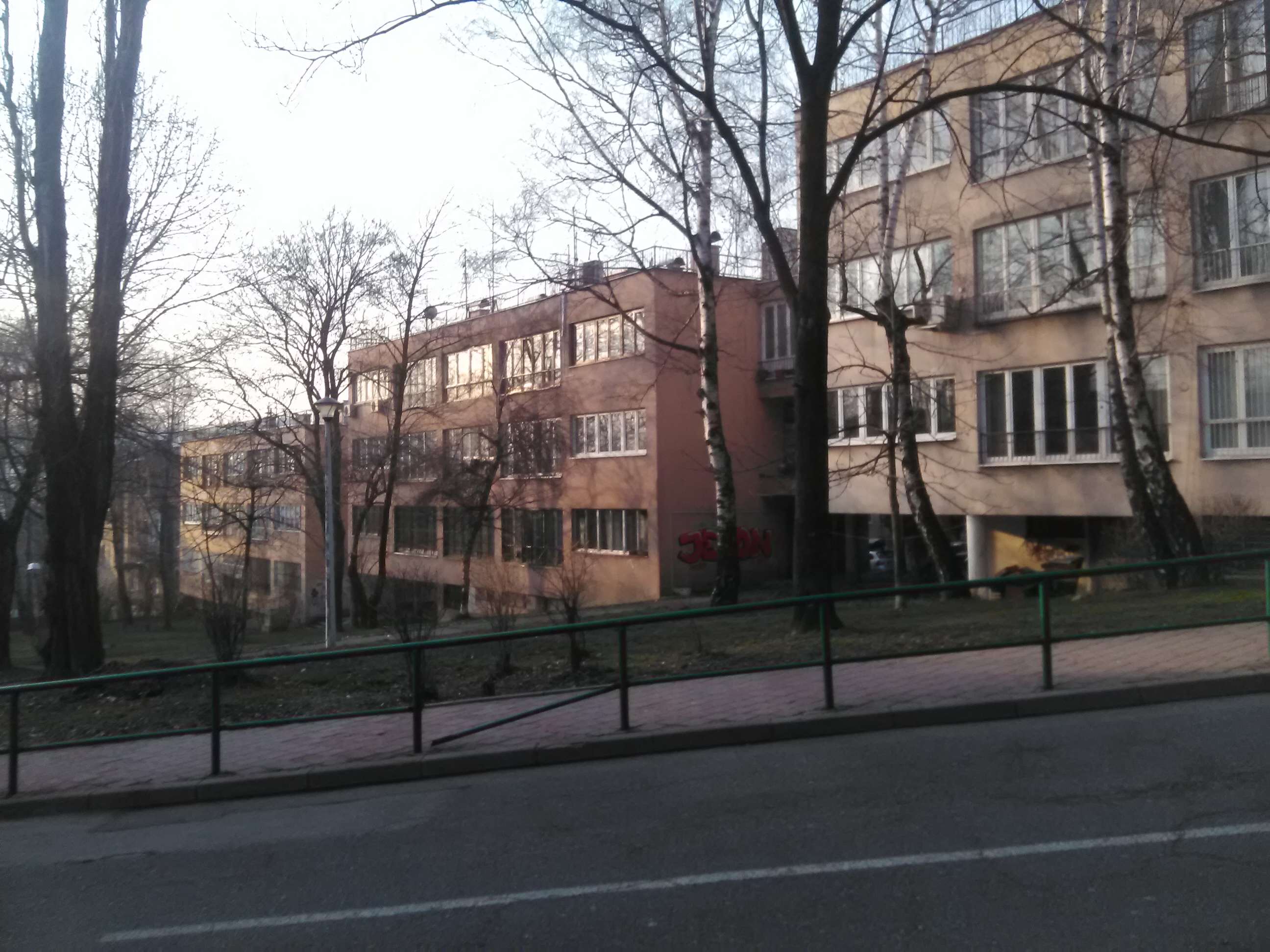
- One of the blocks of Džidžikovac complex in its surroundings during the winter

- Location in Bosnia and Herzegovina

General information
- Status: Completed
- Type: Residential complex
- Architectural style: Modern
- Location: Džidžikovac, Centar, Sarajevo, Bosnia and Herzegovina
- Coordinates: 43°51′41.0″N 18°24′56.5″E
- Year built: 1948
- Construction started: 1947
- Completed: 1948
- Owner: individual tenants

Technical details
- Material: Reinforced concrete, brick
- Floor count: 1B+G+2
- Lifts/elevators: no

Design and construction
- Architects: Kadić brothers, Muhamed and Reuf
- Architecture firm: Projektantski zavod NR BiH
- Designations

KONS of Bosnia and Herzegovina
- Official name: Residential complex on Džidžikovac, the architectural ensemble
- Type: Category immovable property of Bosnia and Herzegovina
- Criteria: A, C iii.iv., D iii., F i.ii.iii., G i.iii.v., H ii., I i.ii.iii.
- Designated: 30 January 2008 (?th session)
- Reference no.: 02-2-73/04-7
- State: National Monuments of Bosnia and Herzegovina

Džidžikovac Residential Complex (Cyrillic: Џиџиковац), is an architectural residential ensemble in the neighborhood of Džidžikovac in Sarajevo, Bosnia and Herzegovina. The central part of the neighborhood was developed after World War II, primarily between 1946 and 1959. At its core is a modernist residential complex designed by the prominent Kadić brothers (Muhamed and Reuf). Construction started in 1948 with a final building added in 1959. The complex was declared a National Monument of Bosnia and Herzegovina since 2008 by KONS.

== History ==
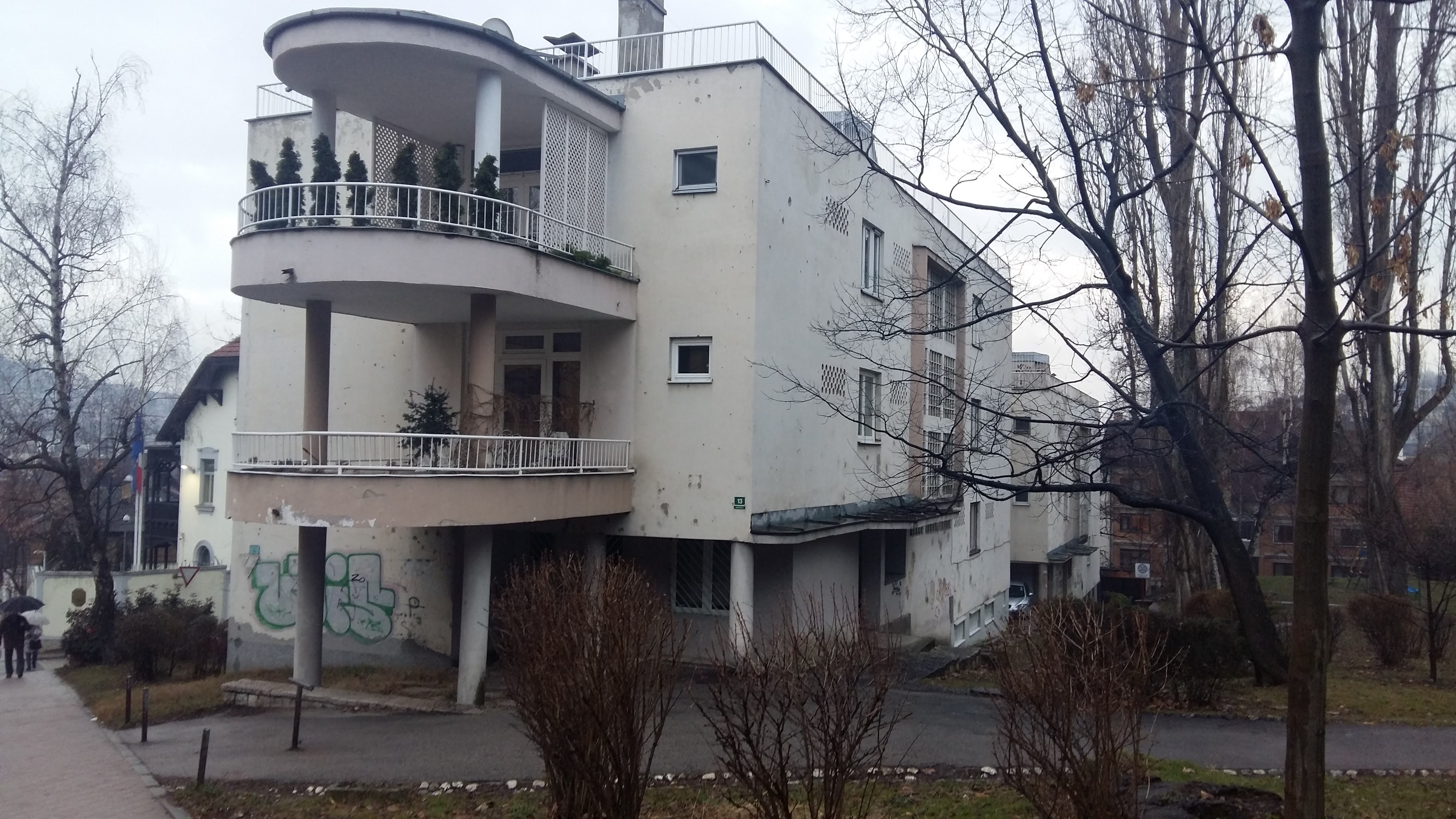
The "Residential complex on Džidžikovac, the architectural ensemble" is a National monument of Bosnia and Herzegovina

The central area of the neighbourhood was designed and developed after the World War II, mostly between 1946 and 1959, while streets and areas in the immediate surroundings were already developed during the second half of the 19th century, featuring numerous luxurious villas built in various Austro-Hungarian architectural styles by the architects from around Austro-Hungarian Empire. Neighborhood is conceived as residential, on a steep hillside above the city center. The location, which had never been developed before, featured a lush green landscape with small private flower gardens and numerous plum, apple, cherry, and pear orchards – hence the name Džidžikovac, which comes from the word "džidži" which is Bosnian pronunciation of Ottoman Turkish word "güzel", and which in Bosnian means: nadžidžan, nagizdan, gizdav, ukrašen, in English: picturesque, ornate or florid.

Following World War II, the government's primary, if not only focus in the war-torn country was providing basic housing. Facing severe shortages of both funding and materials, creative architectural expression was temporarily relegated to the background.

During these post-war years, Projektantski zavod NR BiH (Design Institute of the People's Republic of Bosnia and Herzegovina) served as Sarajevo's primary bureau for architectural design and construction, with brothers Muhamed and Reuf Kadić acting as its leading architects. Shortly after joining the institute in 1946, the brothers first major commission became the Džidžikovac Residential Complex. Designed in 1947, the complex became a landmark of Sarajevo's post-war architecture and a showcase of their modernist style.

As informal pre-war members of the Modern Movement, the Kadić brothers continued to exert their influence through new projects and realizations. They successfully promoted the modernist core tenets, such as minimalism and functionalism—specifically the principle that form follows function—to a regime whose urgent needs were dictated by the practical and financial constraints of a post-war socialist society. Given that economic factors were decisive in construction, the Kadićs still managed to achieve significant results in architecture, with the Džidžikovac Residential Complex serving as a prime example.

== Location ==
The complex of residential buildings designated as a National Monument is located in the Džidžikovac neighborhood, in central part of Sarajevo, Municipality Center. The complex is bounded by Džikovac Street from the southeast, by Hadži-Idrizova Street from the north, by Mehmed-beg kapetana Ljubušak Street from the south and towards the west, the complex is limited by another block of residential buildings.

== Features ==
As in many other cases around central parts of Sarajevo, neighborhood designers utilized the presence of abundant natural greenery on the location and developed designated space while preserving as much as possible. This became a characteristic of the neighborhood, one which constitutes important quality and attraction.

== National monument ==
In 2008 Džidžikovc was proclaimed National Monument of Bosnia and Herzegovina as "Residential complex on Džidžikovac – the architectural ensemble" by the Commission to preserve national monuments of Bosnia and Herzegovina, due to its architectural and landscaping qualities.

== See also ==
- Walled city of Vratnik
