= Kriva Ćuprija =

Bridge in Mostar, Bosnia and Herzegovina

Crocked Bridge Kriva Ćuprija
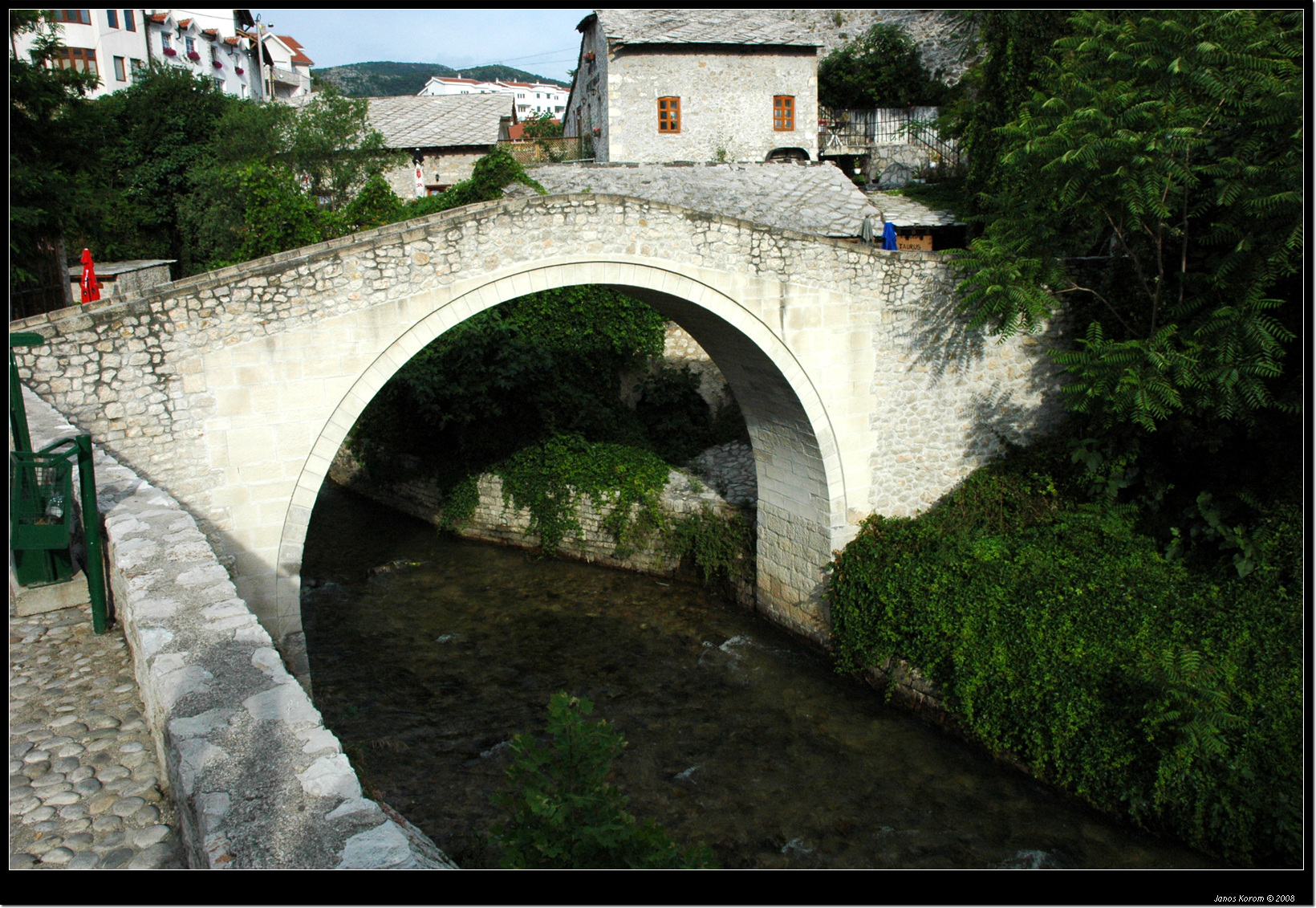
- Bridge over Radobolja in Old Town Mostar
- Coordinates: 43°20′13″N 17°48′47″E
- Crosses: Radobolja
- Locale: Old Town Mostar; Bosnia and Herzegovina
- Official name: Kriva Ćuprija
- Owner: state
- Maintained by: Institute for the Protection of Monuments of the Federation of Bosnia and Herzegovina; KONS
- Heritage status

UNESCO World Heritage Site
- Official name: As part of Mostar, the historic site
- Type: Cultural
- Criteria: vi
- Designated: 2005 (29th session)
- Reference no.: 946
- Region: Europe

KONS of Bosnia and Herzegovina
- Official name: As part of Mostar, the historic site
- Type: Category 0 cultural property
- Criteria: A, B, C ii.iii.iv., D ii.iv., E i.ii.iii.iv.v., F i.ii.iii., G i.v.vi.vii., H ii., I i.ii.iii.
- Designated: 8 July 2004 (session No. 07.1-02-903/03-29)
- Part of: Mostar, the historic site
- Reference no.: 2495
- List of National Monuments of Bosnia and Herzegovina

Characteristics
- Material: Limestone
- Height: 4.15
- Traversable?: yes
- No. of spans: 1

History
- Built: 1558

Statistics
- Daily traffic: pedestrian

Kriva Ćuprija (or the transl. Crooked Bridge) is a small stone bridge across the Radobolja river in Mostar, Bosnia and Herzegovina. The bridge is oldest one arch bridge in Mostar, built in 1558 during the Ottoman rule. Its builder was the Ottoman architect Ćejvan Ketoda.

It is located about thirty meters west of the Stari Most and represents its miniature version. It connects the banks of Radobolje with the one semicircular arch of 8.56 m in diameter. The bridge is 4.15 m high, and it is approached by stone steps.

Kriva Ćuprija belongs to the architectural complex of the Old Town of Mostar, and has been declared a National Monument of Bosnia and Herzegovina by KONS and a World Heritage Site by UNESCO.
