= Džidžikovac =

Džidžikovac Џиџиковац
- Neighborhood
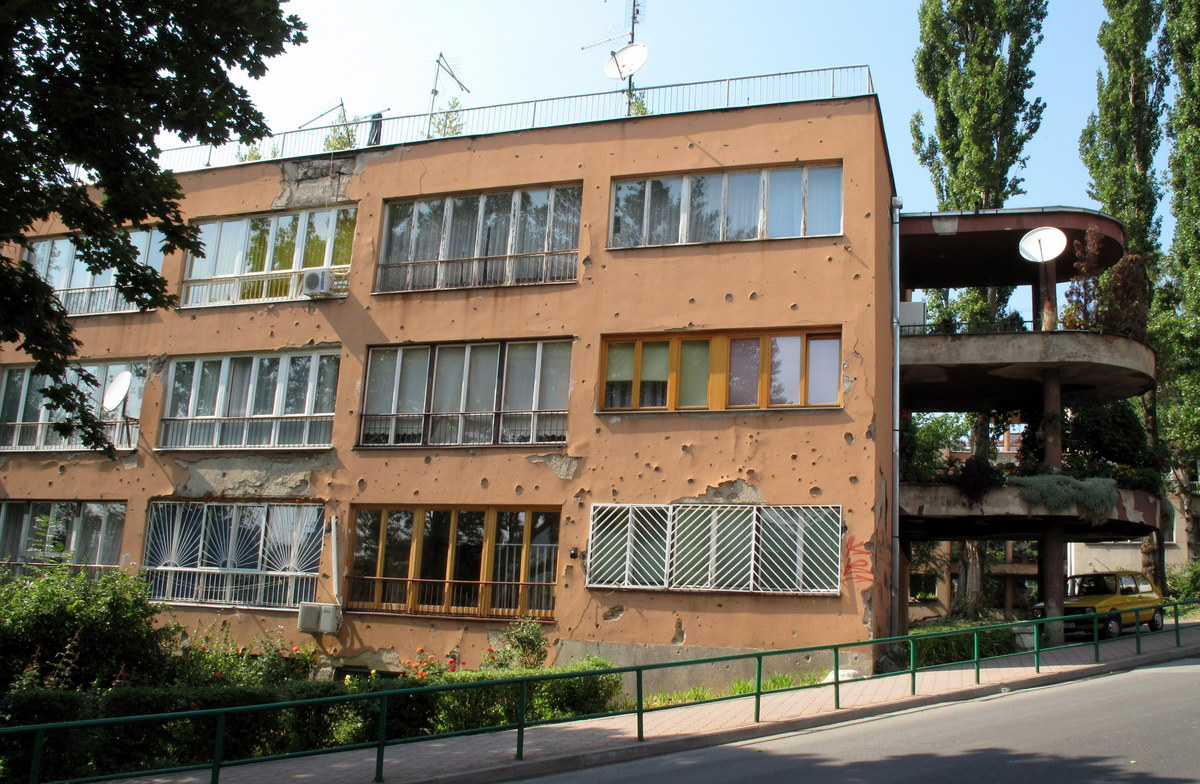
- Standard facade on one of the buildings in Džidžikovac main residential complex – note bullets and artillery shell shrapnel's holes, prior recent renovation, remnants of Bosnian War.
- Interactive map of Džidžikovac
- Location in Sarajevo, Federation of Bosnia and Herzegovina, and the Bosnia and Herzegovina
- Coordinates: 43°51′41.0″N 18°24′56.5″E
- Country: Bosnia and Herzegovina
- BiH Entity: FBiH
- Canton: Sarajevo Canton
- City: Sarajevo
- Municipality: Centar
- Developed: since 1946

Government
  - Local community president: NN
  - Municipality president: NN
- Time zone: UTC+1 (CET)
  - Summer (DST): UTC+2 (CEST)
- Area code: +387

Džidžikovac (Cyrillic: Џиџиковац) is a neighborhood, and with Koševo neighbourhood together constitute a local community (Mjesna zajednica; MZ) of Koševo-Džidžikovac, in Sarajevo, Bosnia and Herzegovina. Since 2008, the locality has been designated as a National Monument of Bosnia and Herzegovina.

Džidžikovac derives its name from the Bosnian pronunciation of the Ottoman Turkish word güzel, meaning "beautiful" or "picturesque."

== Location ==
Džidžikovac is situated above the central parts of Sarajevo's old city center, just above the area where the Building of the Presidency of Bosnia and Herzegovina is located. It is part of the Centar municipality.

Džidžikovac and its immediate surroundings are also home to several major embassies, including the French and Austrian embassies, which are located at the heart of the neighborhood.

== History ==
The central area of the neighborhood was designed and developed after World War II, primarily between 1946 and 1959. However, the surrounding streets and areas had already been developed, featuring many luxurious villas and buildings constructed in the second half of the 19th century in various architectural styles of the era by architects from the Austro-Hungarian Empire.

The neighborhood was conceived as a residential area on a steep hillside above the city center, characterized by abundant greenery. Before its development, the area had never been built upon and was home to numerous small private flower gardens, as well as orchards filled with plum, apple, cherry, and pear trees. This natural beauty is reflected in the name Džidžikovac, derived from the word "džidži," the Bosnian pronunciation of the Ottoman Turkish word "güzel." In Bosnian, it translates to nadžidžan, nagizdan, gizdav, ukrašen, meaning picturesque, ornate, or florid.

== Features ==
As in many other areas in central Sarajevo, the neighborhood's designers took advantage of the abundant natural greenery, integrating it into the development while preserving as much of it as possible. This approach became a defining characteristic of Džidžikovac, contributing to its unique charm and appeal.

== National monument ==
In 2008, Džidžikovac was declared a National Monument of Bosnia and Herzegovina as the "Residential Complex on Džidžikovac – Architectural Ensemble" by the Commission to Preserve National Monuments of Bosnia and Herzegovina, recognizing its architectural and landscaping significance.

== See also ==
- Višnjik
