= Višnjik 16 traditional house =

Historic building, national monument in Sarajevo

Coordinates: 43.865334°N 18.416827°E

Višnjik 16 house
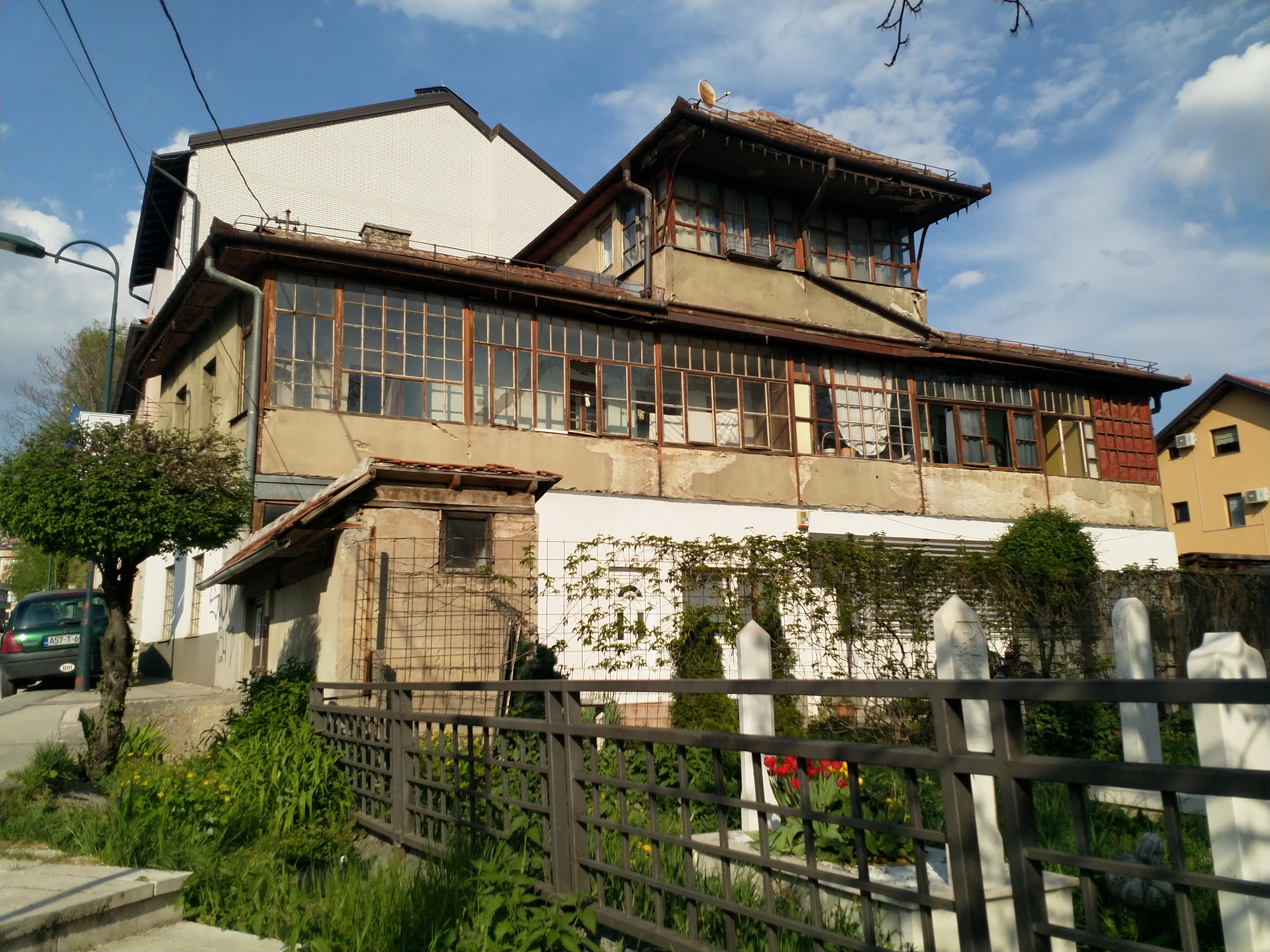

General information
- Type: residential
- Architectural style: vernacular with Secession influences
- Location: Višnjik 16, Sarajevo, Bosnia and Herzegovina
- Completed: 19th century

Technical details
- Floor count: 2

Design and construction
- Architect: unknown

KONS of Bosnia and Herzegovina
- Official name: Residential building at Višnjik Street 16, historical building
- Type: Category II monument
- Criteria: II. Value; A, C iii.iv., D iv., F ii., G ii.iii.v., I i.ii.iii.
- Designated: November 5, 2015 (session No.66)
- Part of: Višnjik neighborhood
- Reference no.: 3924
- Decision no.: 07.3-2.3-64/15-20
- Listed: List of National Monuments of Bosnia and Herzegovina
- Operator: -

Višnjik 16 house is an old house in Sarajevo, Bosnia and Herzegovina, located in the Višnjik neighbourhood. It was designed by unknown architect in vernacular style with secessionist elements. The building is residential, with a ground floor and first floor. On November 5, 2015, the building is inscribed into the List of National monuments of Bosnia and Herzegovina by KONS, at the 66th session.
