= Croatian Lodge "Herceg Stjepan Kosača" =

- Hrvatski dom Herceg Stjepan Kosača
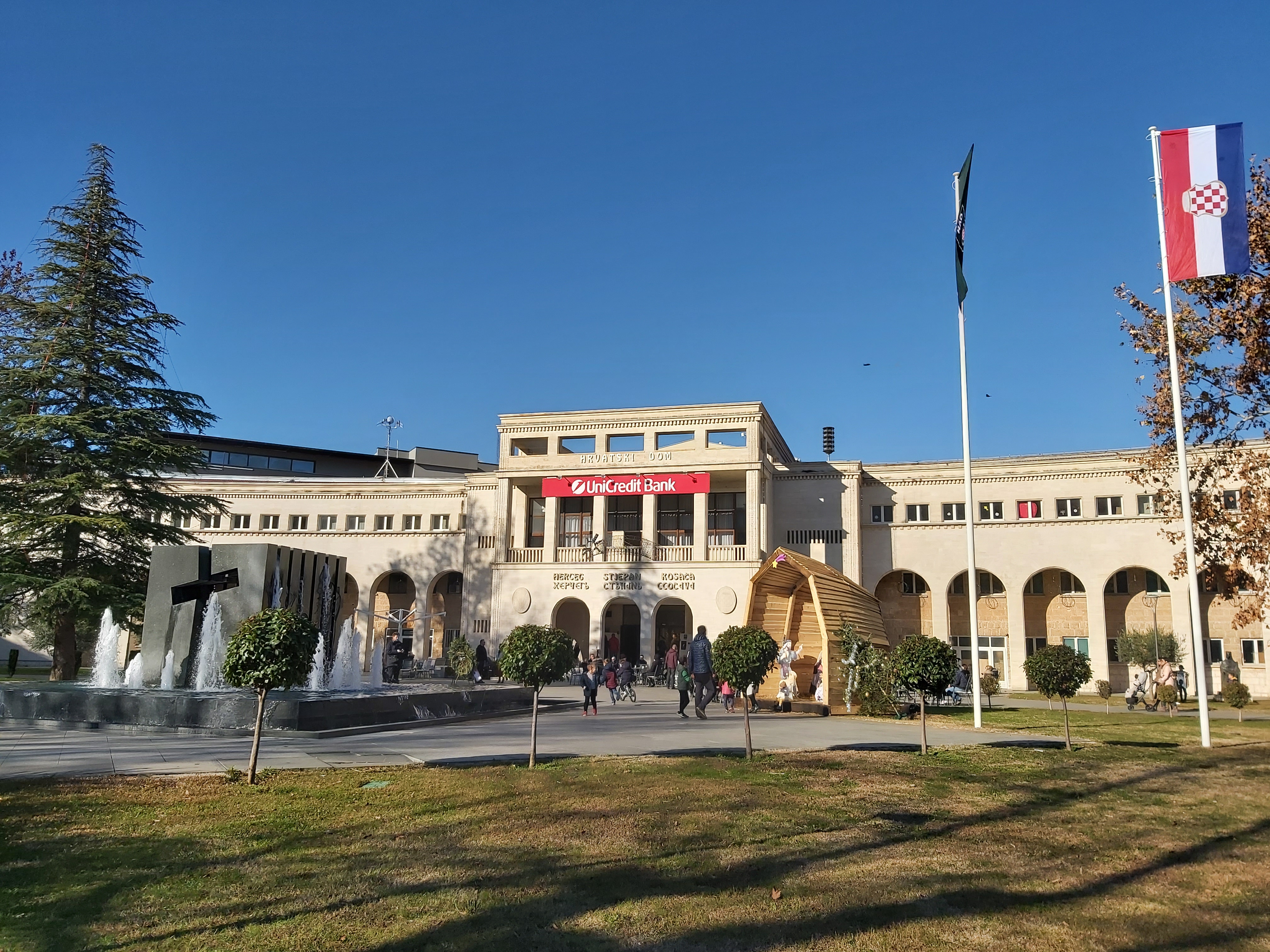
- Interactive map of the Croatian Lodge "Herceg Stjepan Kosača" area
- Former names: Culture Lodge

General information
- Location: Trg hrvatskih velikana bb (Rondo), Mostar, Bosnia and Herzegovina
- Coordinates: 43°20′32″N 17°48′08″E
- Construction started: 1959
- Completed: 1960

Design and construction
- Architect: Reuf Kadić

Website
- kosaca-mostar.com

Croatian Lodge "Herceg Stjepan Kosača" (Croatian: Hrvatski dom Herceg Stjepan Kosača) is a city-sponsored public institution in Mostar, Bosnia and Herzegovina, which promotes, assists and organizes educational and art events. It was named after Herzog Stjepan Vukčić Kosača, a 14th-century nobleman from Herzegovina. Its premises are used for art exhibitions, concerts, theatre performances, lectures, movie screenings, puppet shows, dance classes, lectures, and conventions.

== History and premises ==
Croatian Lodge "Herceg Stjepan Kosača" building was called a "Culture Lodge" (Serbo-Croatian: Dom kulture) prior to 1994. It was designed by the modernist Sarajevo architect Reuf Kadić and the construction work began in 1959. The first wing was completed in July 1959 and the second one was added in September of the same year. Building was fully completed and furnished in 1960.

The Croatian Lodge "Herceg Stjepan Kosača" building is located in the city center (Rondo area) and it houses a public library, cafe-bar and a music school. "Herceg Stjepan Kosača" is a main venu of the art event called "Dani Matice Hrvatske" which encompasses diverse cultural events between March and May every year and enlivens the city of Mostar. The programme, managed and organized by the Croatian Community, includes classical, pop and modern music concerts, theatre, puppet shows, exhibitions, cinema reviews, poetry readings, book and CD music presentations. Croatian Lodge "Herceg Stjepan Kosača" is also used as a main space for other art events and festivals such as "Mostar Spring", Mostar Summer Festival, "Večernjakov Pečat", and Mostar Films Days (organized by the Octavian Association from Mostar).

The Croatian Lodge "Herceg Stjepan Kosača" premises include the following:

- A concert hall with 726 seats and associated facilities (makeup room, dressing rooms, toilets, showers)
- Queen Katarina Kosača Art Gallery (two exhibition spaces).
- Small hall with 120 seats (for seminars, presentations, and book promotions).
- Two classrooms (mostly used for language courses).
- Great hall (mostly used for wedding ceremonies and seminar presentations).

A number of cultural events frequently take place in The Croatian Lodge "Herceg Stjepan Kosača" and there are art exhibitions, music performances or poetry readings happening almost daily.

== Gallery ==
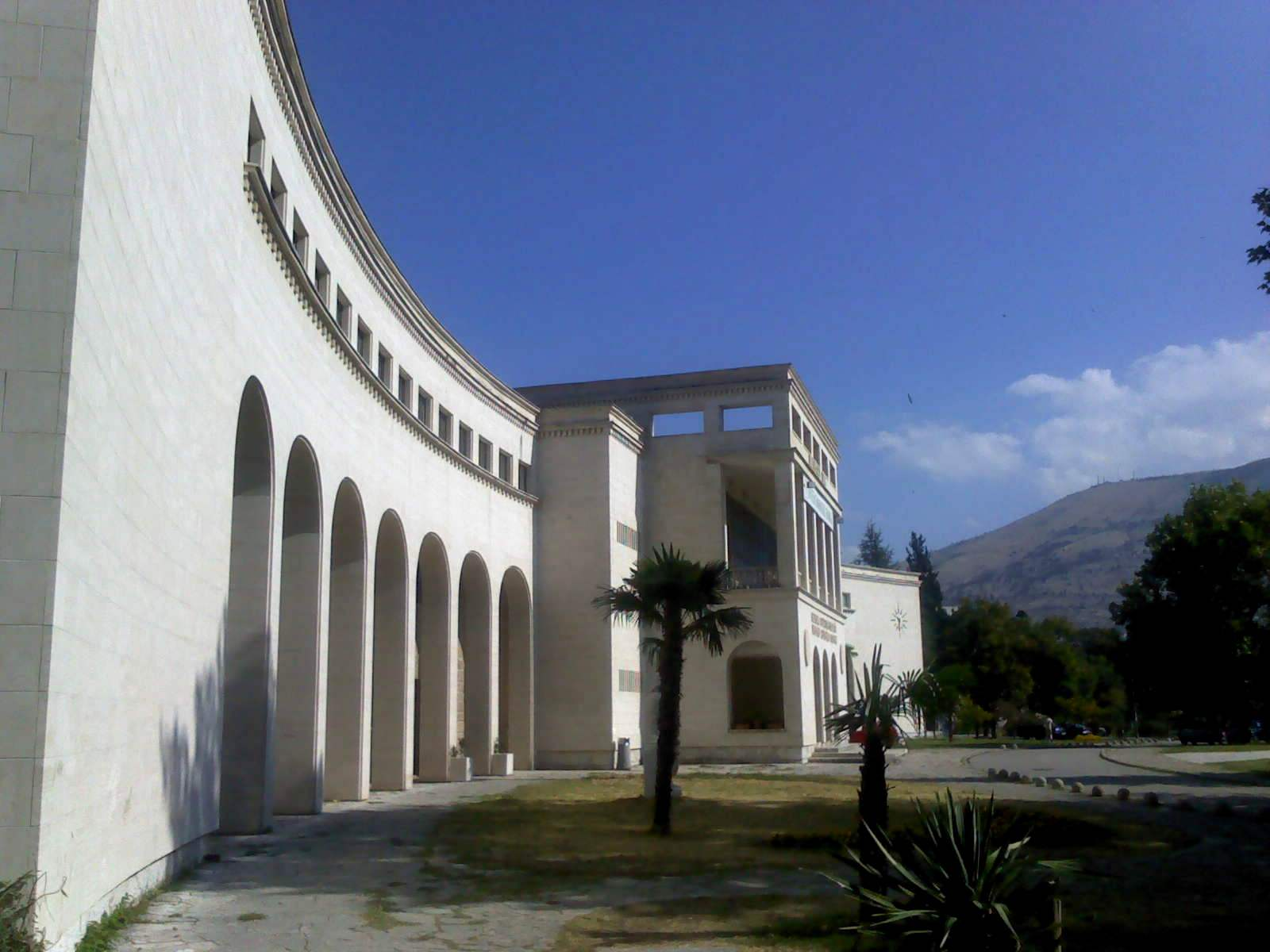
Croatian Lodge "Herceg Stjepan Kosaca" in Mostar
