= Stara Ćuprija Glavatičevo =

Stara Ćuprija Stara Župska Ćuprija
- Coordinates: 43°30′07″N 18°06′23″E
- Carried: Motor vehicles, pedestrians and bicycles
- Crossed: Neretva
- Locale: Glavatičevo, Bosnia and Herzegovina
- Heritage status: KONS
- Preceded by: Most Ulog
- Followed by: Stara Ćuprija

Characteristics
- Design: Stone arch bridge
- Material: Stone, Wood, Steal, Asphalt
- Total length: cca 60 m (197 ft)
- Width: cca 4 m (13 ft)
- Height: cca 10 m (33 ft)
- Longest span: cca 40 m (131 ft)
- No. of spans: 1
- Piers in water: 2
- Clearance below: cca 8 m (26 ft) at mid-span

History
- Architect: unknown Ottoman architect
- Constructed by: Hadži-Balija from Mostar
- Construction end: around 1612
- Rebuilt: 1839, again 1946
- Collapsed: between 1941-45
- Replaced by: deck replaced by steal and asphalt

Stara Ćuprija Glavatičevo is an old Ottoman bridge in the center of Glavatičevo village, Bosnia and Herzegovina, spanning Neretva river.

== See also ==
- List of bridges in Bosnia and Herzegovina
- List of National Monuments of Bosnia and Herzegovina
