= Ilići =

Suburb of Mostar, Bosnia and Herzegovina

- Suburb
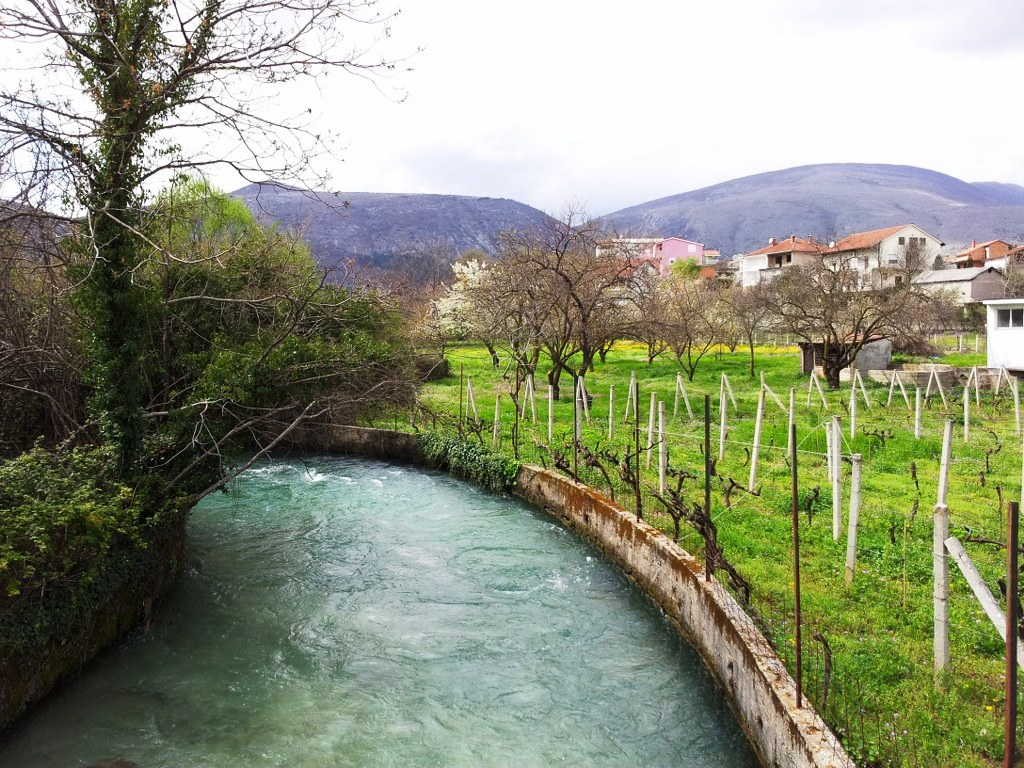
- Ilići and river Radobolja in Mostar

- Location within Bosnia and Herzegovina
- Coordinates: 43.3472°N 17.7681°E
- Country: Bosnia and Herzegovina
- Entity: Federation of Bosnia and Herzegovina
- Canton: Herzegovina-Neretva
- Municipality: City of Mostar

Area
  - Total: 3.49 sq mi (9.05 km^{2})
- Elevation: 300 ft (90 m)

Population (2013)
  - Total: 2,585
  - Density: 740/sq mi (286/km^{2})
- Time zone: UTC+1 (CET)
  - Summer (DST): UTC+2 (CEST)

Ilići is a suburban neighborhood of Mostar, Bosnia and Herzegovina, centered on the main strip of Ilićka Street immediately west of downtown and extending until the spring of Radobolja river.

Ilići is located at 43.3472 N, 17.7681 E, at an average elevation of 90 metres.

== Demographics ==
According to the 2013 census, its population was 2,585.

Ethnicity in 2013
Ethnicity	Number	Percentage
Croats	2,497	96.6%
Bosniaks	62	2.4%
Serbs	4	0.2%
other/undeclared	22	0.9%
Total	2,585	100%

== Gallery ==
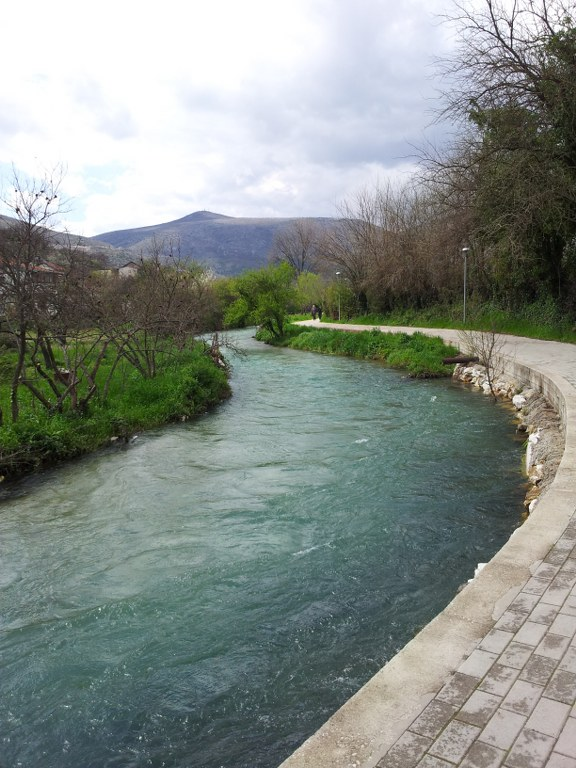
Radobolja river in Ilići, Mostar

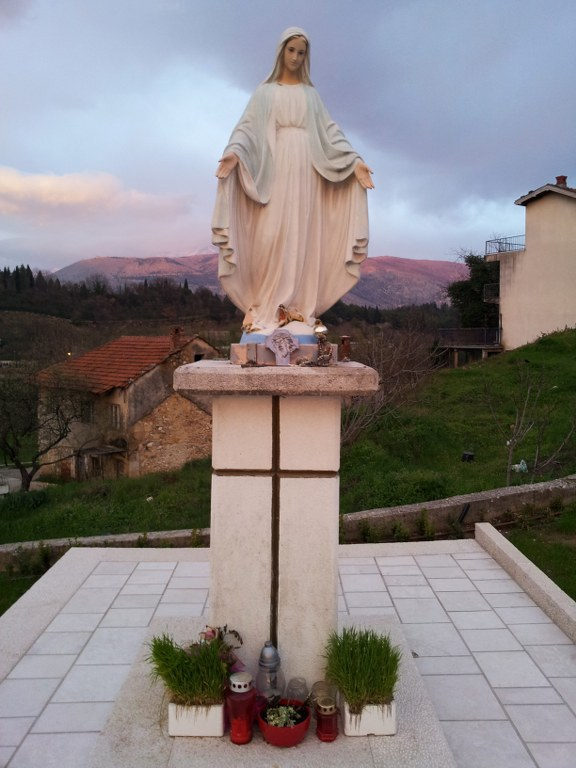
Virgin Mary statue in Ilići, Mostar

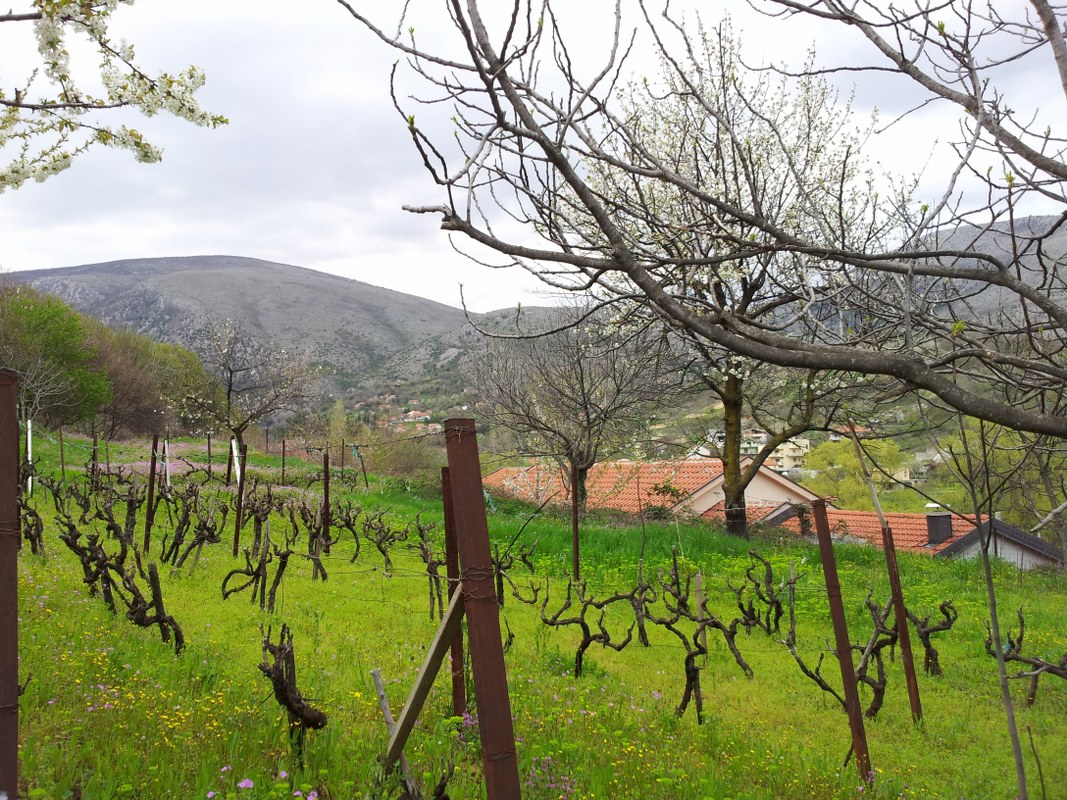
Orchard in Ilići, Mostar
