= Višnjik, Sarajevo =

Višnjik Вишњик
- Neighborhood and Local community
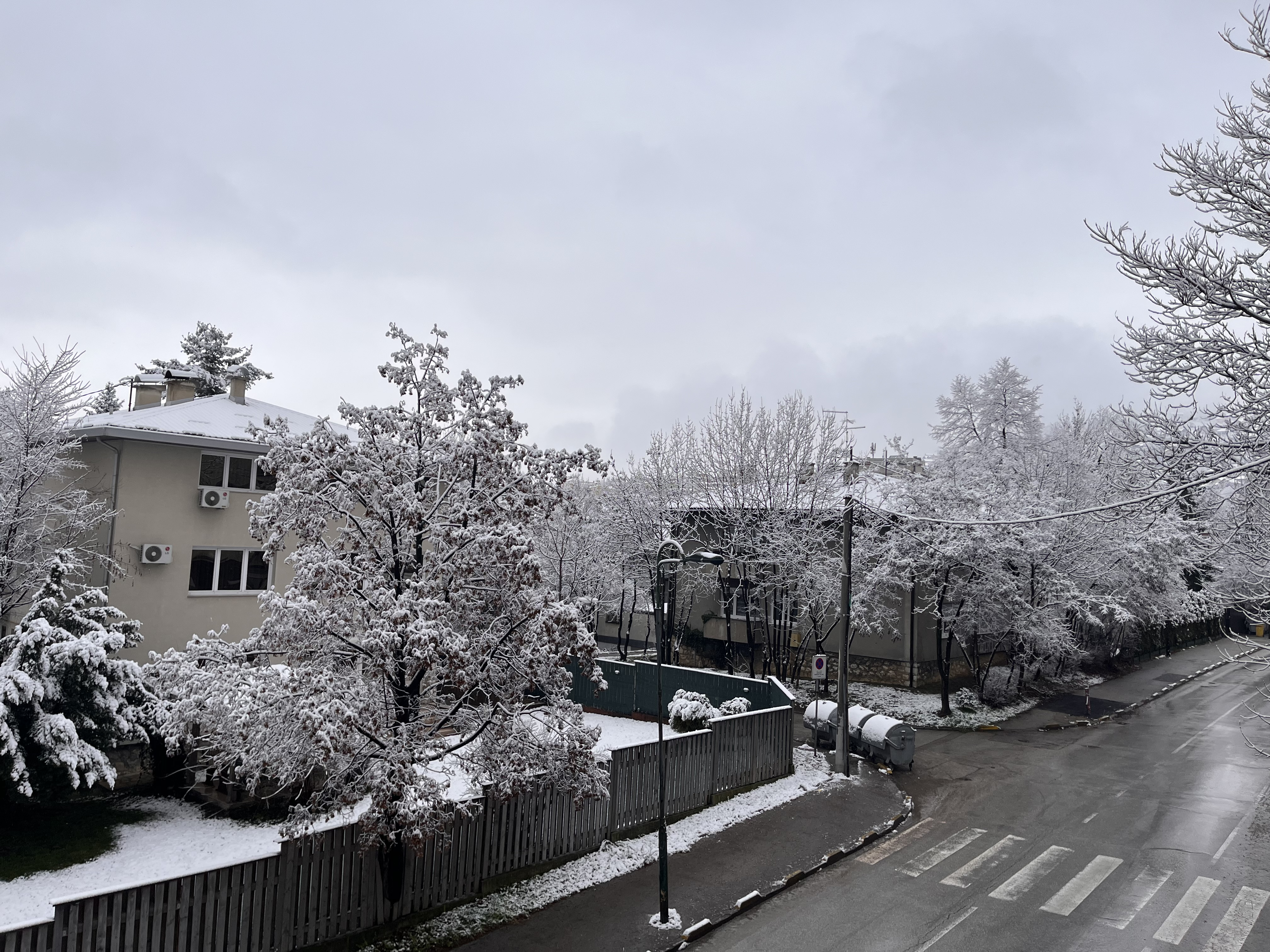
- Part of the Višnjik street in winter
- Local community of Park-Višnjik in Sarajevo
- Coordinates: 43.866774°N 18.417689°E
- Country: Bosnia and Herzegovina
- Entity: FBiH
- Canton: Sarajevo
- City: Sarajevo
- Municipality: Centar Municipality, Sarajevo
- Local community: MZ Park-Višnjik
- Developed: since 1960
- Time zone: UTC+1 (CET)
  - Summer (DST): UTC+2 (CEST)
- Area code: +387

Višnjik (Cyrillic: Вишњик, lit. "Cherry orchard") is a neighborhood, that togeether with Park neighborhood together constitutes the local community (Mjesna zajednica; MZ) Park-Višnjik, in Sarajevo, Bosnia and Herzegovina.

== Location ==
Višnjik is part of Centar municipality. It is north-west of Baščaršija.

== History ==
Neighborhood was conceived as residential, on a hillside above city center that, at the time of development, had never been developed on before. Prior to development small private gardens existed along with a large cherry orchard - hence the name Višnjik (in English: Cherry orchard). It was designed and developed after the World War II, mostly between early 1950s and late 1960s.

The historic building Višnjik 16, designed by unknown architect in vernacular style with secessionist elements, is inscribed into the List of National monuments of Bosnia and Herzegovina by KONS.

== Features ==
Neighborhood designers utilized the presence of abundant natural greenery on the location, and developed designated space while preserving most of it. This became a main attribute of the neighborhood, one which constitutes important quality and appeal. Višnjik neighborhood on its northern side borders with large Koševo hospital complex (KCUS, Klinički centar univerziteta Sarajevo).

== See also ==
- Sarajevo
