= Počitelj =

- village
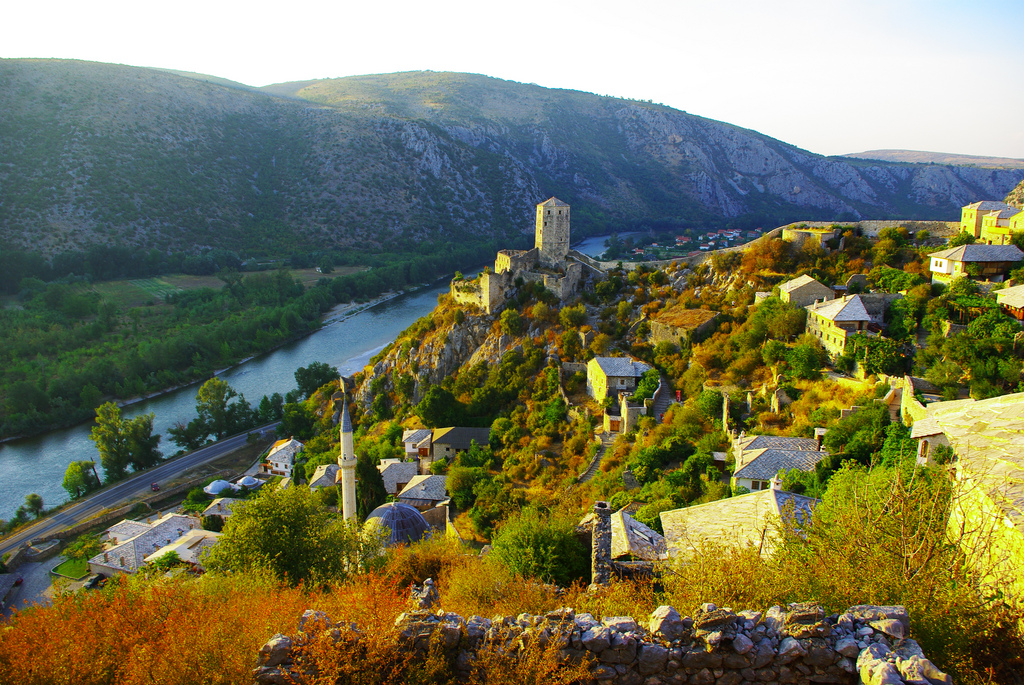
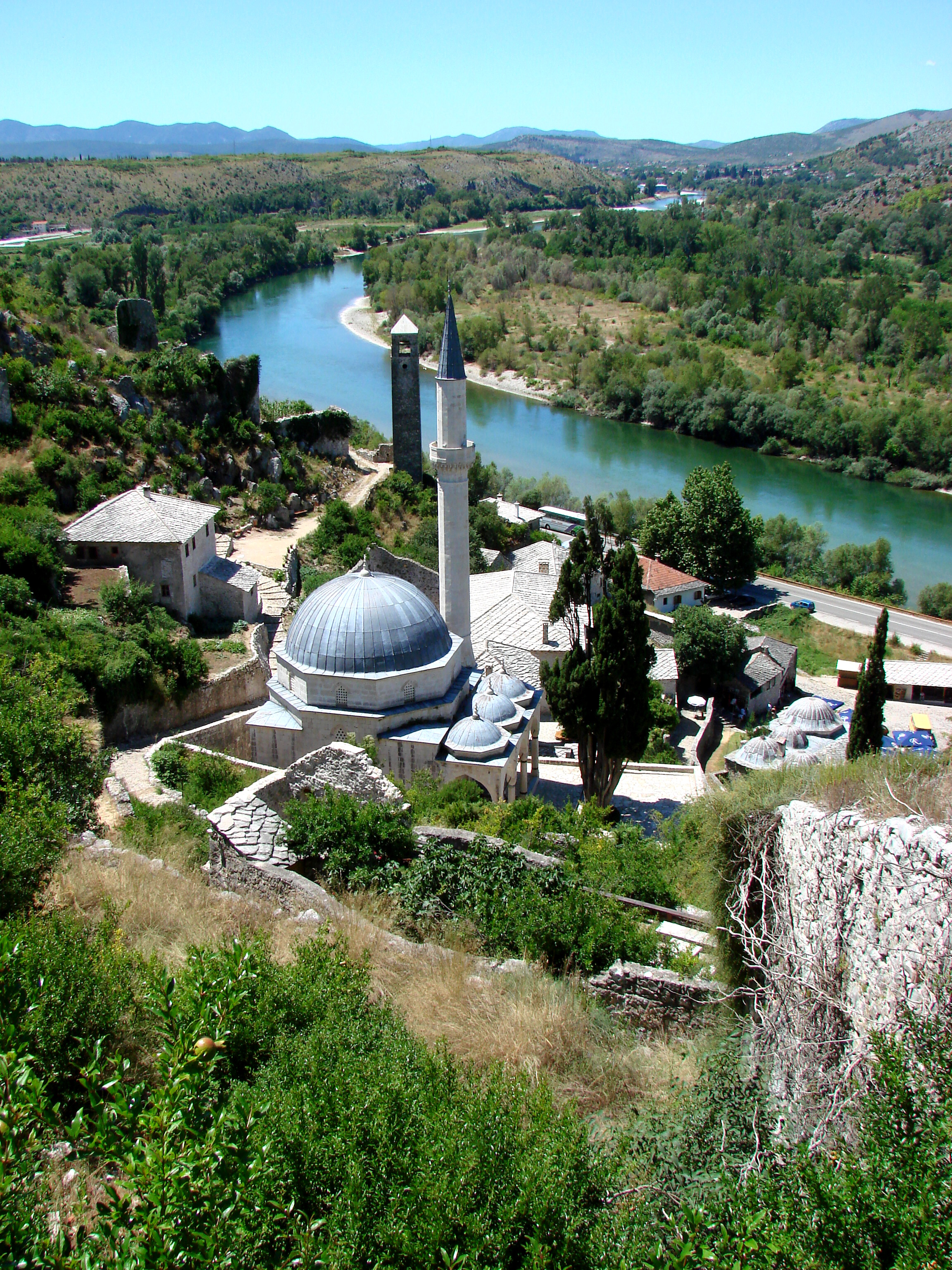
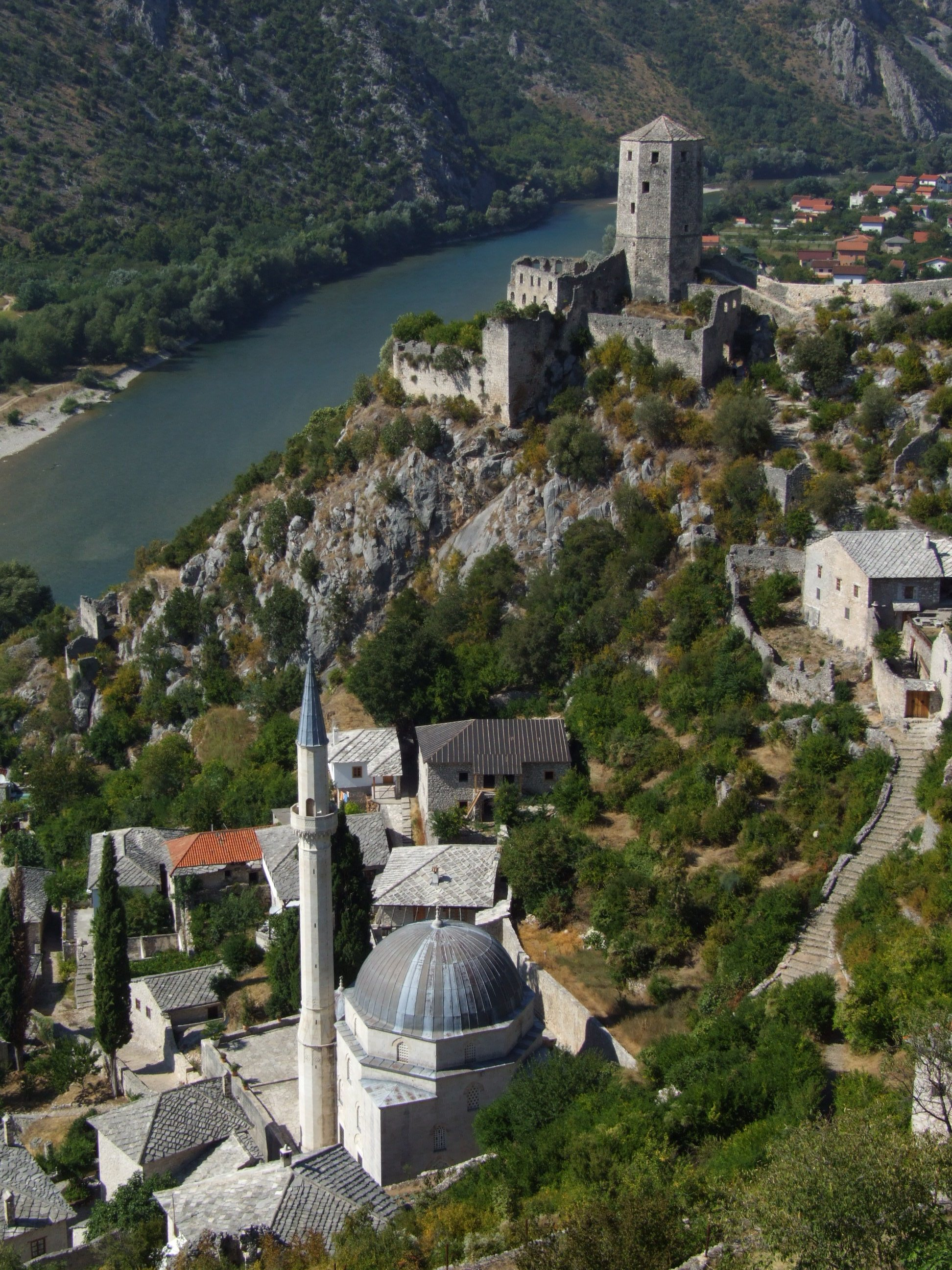
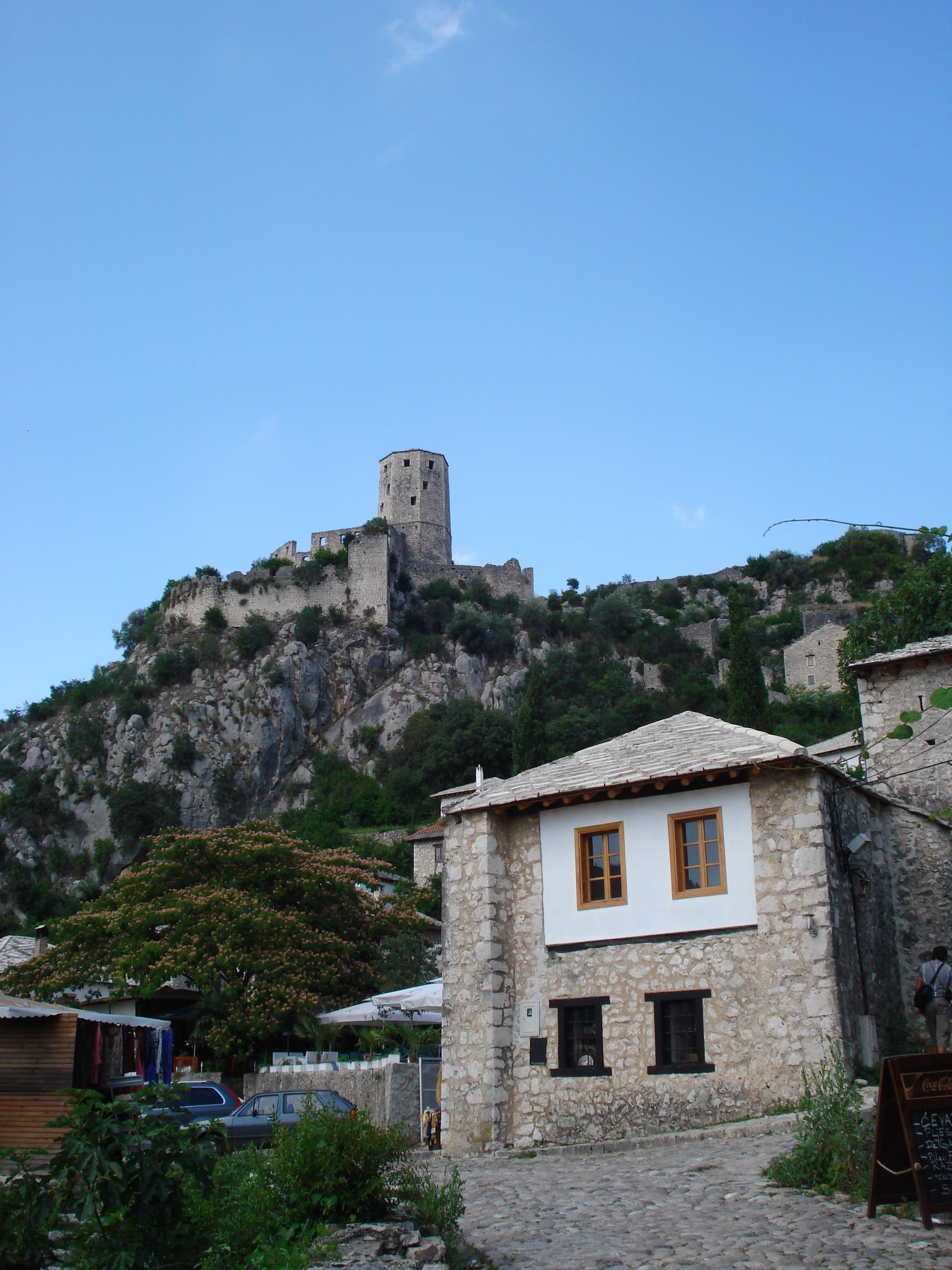
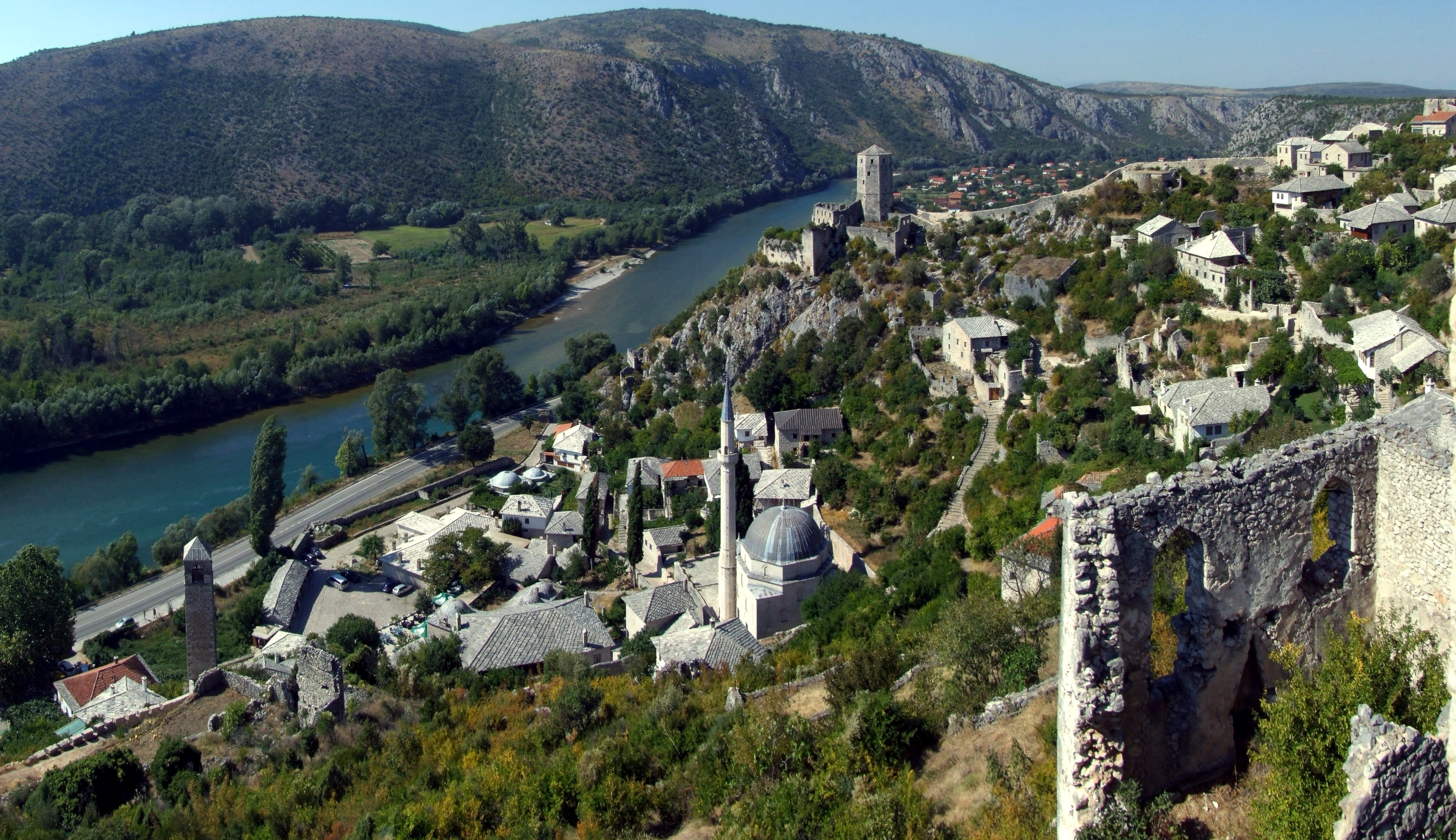
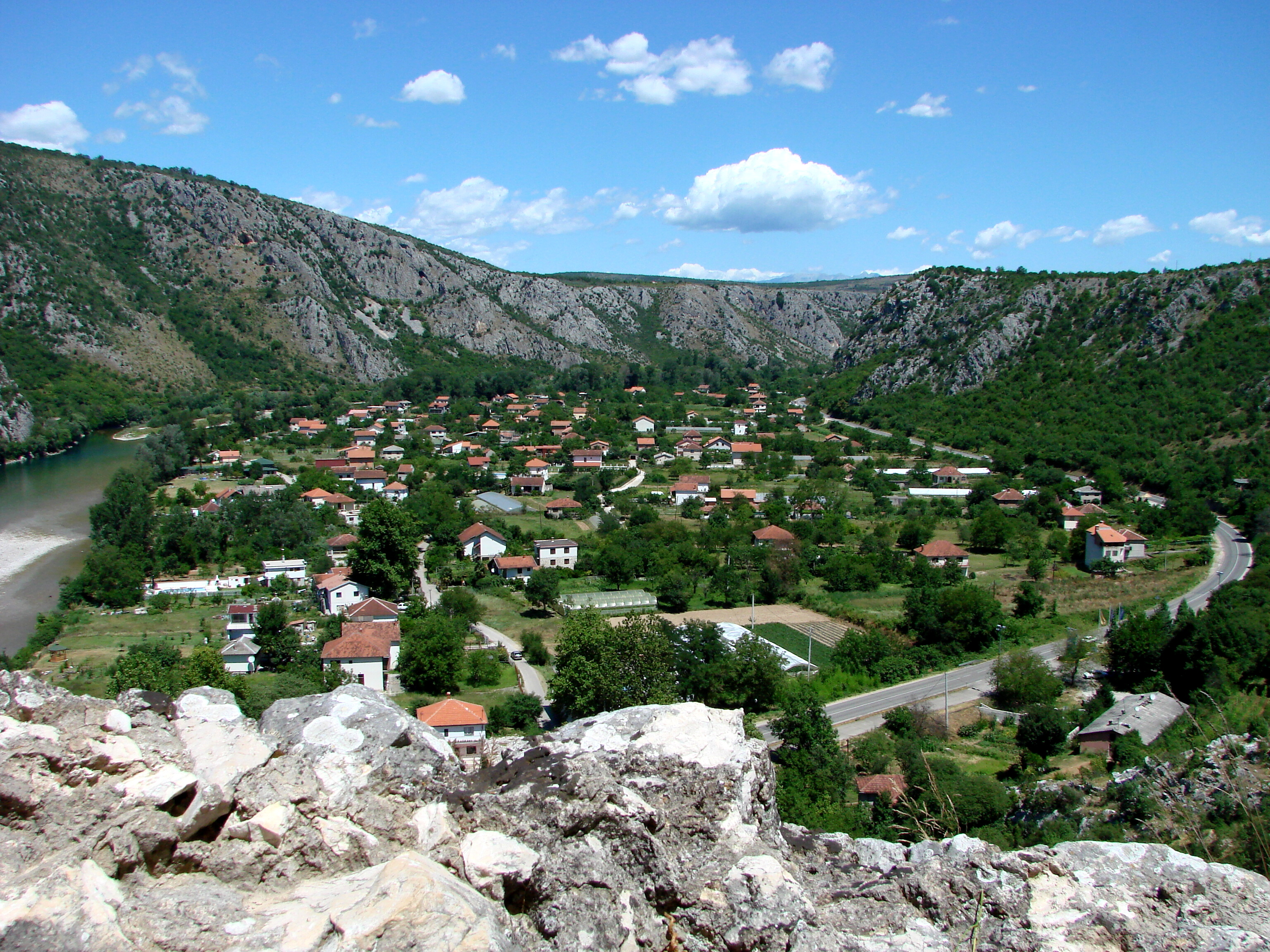
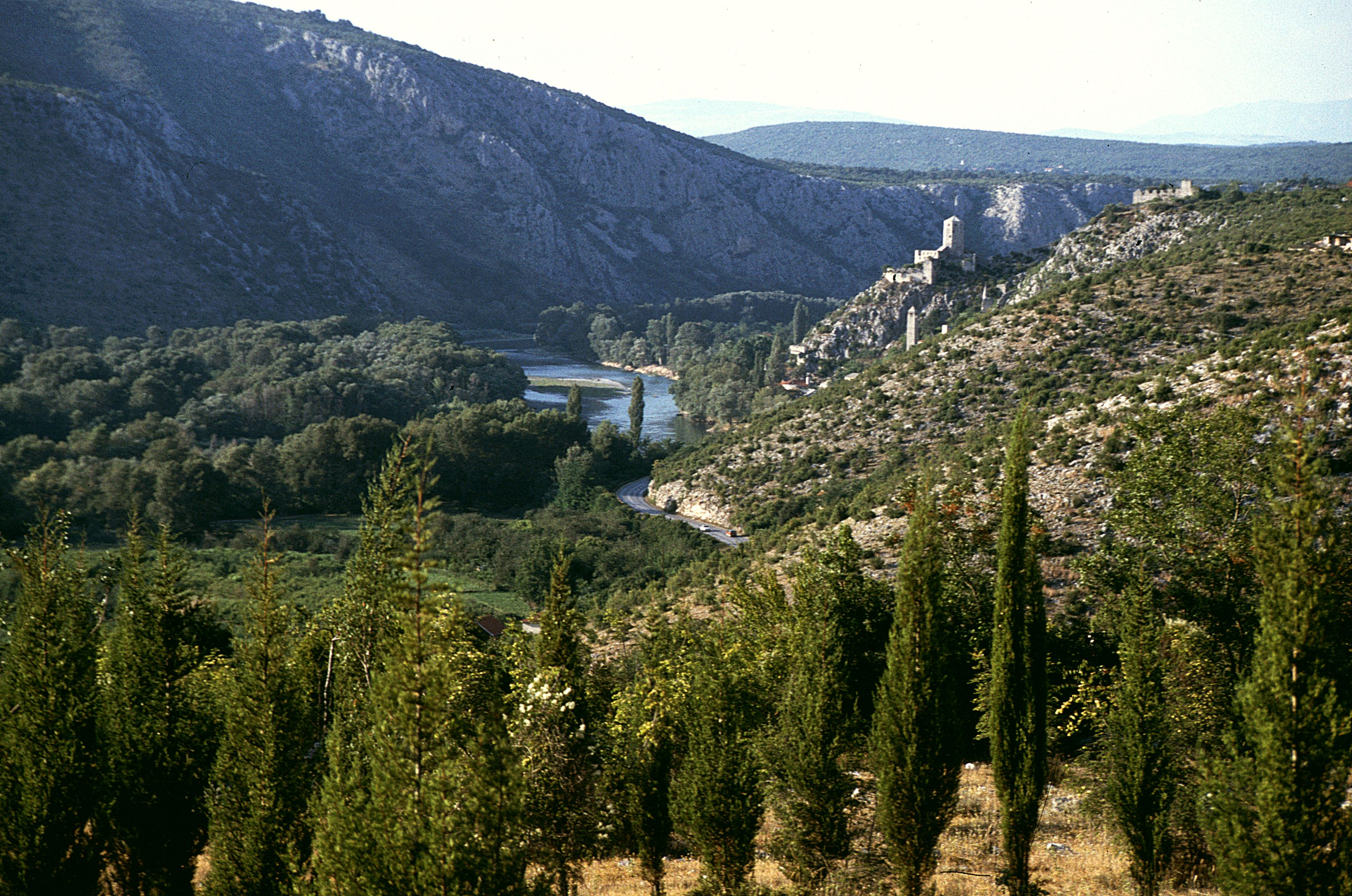
- Interactive map of Počitelj
- Location within Bosnia and Herzegovina
- Coordinates: 43°08′N 17°44′E
- Country: Bosnia and Herzegovina
- Entity: Federation of Bosnia and Herzegovina
- Canton: Herzegovina-Neretva
- Township: Čapljina

Area
  - Total: 6.97 km^{2} (2.69 sq mi)

Population (2013)
  - Total: 799
  - Density: 115/km^{2} (297/sq mi)
- Time zone: UTC+1 (CET)
  - Summer (DST): UTC+2 (CEST)
- Area code: +387 036

Počitelj is a settlement and a historic village in the Čapljina, Bosnia and Herzegovina. It's part of the Herzegovina-Neretva Canton of the Federation of Bosnia and Herzegovina. Its walled nucleus is protected National Monument of Bosnia and Herzegovina and an open-air museum. The settlement is situated on the left bank of the river Neretva, on the main road Mostar-Metković.

== Geography ==
It is located in the township of Čapljina, in the Herzegovina-Neretva Canton of the Federation of Bosnia and Herzegovina. The village is situated on the left bank of the river Neretva, on the main road Mostar-Metković, and it is about 30 kilometres (19 mi) to the south of Mostar and about 3 kilometres (1.9 mi) from the centre of Čapljina. The nucleus of the village is built in a natural karst amphitheater along the Neretva river during the Middle Ages.

== History ==
The earliest mention of or recorded reference to Počitelj is in charters of King Alfonso V and Fridrich III from 1444 to 1448. However, the village most likely predates these documents. The exact date cannot be pinpointed but it is likely that fortified town along with its complementary settlements was built by the Bosnian king Tvrtko I sometime in 1383. Počitelj was considered the administrative and governance center of župa Dubrava, and point of major strategic importance. During the years following the fall of Bosnian medieval state and Ottoman conquests, between 1463 and 1471, the town was fortified by Vladislav Hercegović, with a support of Dubrovnik, king Matthias Corvinus of Hungary and the Pope. From this point the walled town of Počitelj continued to evolve, especially in the period from the 16th to the 18th century.

In the period between 1463–1471 the town housed a Hungarian garrison and was fortified into a strategic defense stronghold. In 1471, following a brief siege, the town was conquered by the Ottomans, and remained within the Ottoman Empire until 1878. From 1782 to 1879 Počitelj was the seat of a kadiluk (area under the jurisdiction of a qadi, or judge) and the center of the Počitelj military district from 1713 to 1835.

After the establishment of Austro-Hungarian rule in Bosnia and Herzegovina in 1878, Počitelj lost its strategic importance and started deteriorating rapidly. The population declined gradually. The loss of the town's strategic role assisted in the preservation of the original urban architectural ensemble, so that the town remained in its original form to present day.

The entire historic urban site of Počitelj and surrounding area suffered extensive damage during the 1992–1995 war in Bosnia and Herzegovina. Following the bombing, Počitelj's sixteenth-century masterpieces of Islamic art and architecture were destroyed and a large part of the town's population was ethnically cleansed.

=== Significance and protection ===
Počitelj represents one of the most important and best preserved architectural ensembles within the city walls in the region. The town can be compared with some of the noted world heritage sites as the old towns of Mostar (Bosnia and Herzegovina), Ohrid (North Macedonia), Safranbolu (Turkey), Gjirokastër (Albania).

Počitelj was in 1996 named by the World Monuments Watch as one of the world's 100 most endangered cultural heritage sites. In the year 2000 the Federation of Bosnia and Herzegovina Government initiated the Programme of the permanent protection of Počitelj. As of 2008, the International Council on Monuments and Sites (ICOMOS) expressed concern over the proposed construction of bridge for a nearby highway, on Corridor Vc. While a new potential location for the bridge crossing is being investigated, non-controversial sections are under construction.

== Demographics ==
As of the 2013 census, Počitelj had a population of 106 people less compared to the Yugoslav census that was conducted in 1991. The results of the 2013 census in Počitelj were as follows.

Population Total: 799

- Bosniaks - 466 (58,3%)
- Croats - 316 (39,5%)
- Serbs - 2 (0,3%)
- others and unknown - 15 (1,9%)

== See also ==
- List of National Monuments of Bosnia and Herzegovina
