= Gradaščević Tower, Bijela =

Coordinates: 44°47′41″N 18°34′15″E

Gradaščević Tower, or Gradaščevića kula, also "odžak", is a residential and fortification building dating from the Ottoman period in Bijela, Bosnia and Herzegovina. It has been designated as a National Monument of Bosnia and Herzegovina.

== Location ==
The Gradašćević Tower with a courtyard and the courtyard walls is located in the settlement Bijela in the southern part of the Brčko District, on the last slopes of Majevica mountain.

== History ==
It was built by Osman Pasha Gradaščević in the late 18th or early 19th century. The origin of Gradaščević family is not fully established, but it is well-founded that they came from Hungary and that they are not medieval Bosnian feudal lords, since they are nowhere mentioned in medieval sources about Bosnia. From 1730, when the Gradačac captaincy was formed, all the known captains came from the Gradaščević family. The final breakup between Captain Husein Gradaščević (better known as the "Dragon of Bosnia") and his brother Osman Pasha in 1831 took place in Bijela. Osman Pasha was for reforms proposed by Ottomans, and Hussein was for the anti-reform movement and Bosnian autonomy from the empire.

Kula (the tower) later became the property of Fadilpašić and Džinić bey-families, both from Sarajevo. Mevhiba Džinić and her family lived in it until June 10, 1948, when nationalization took place.

On March 3, 1949, the negligence of new users resulted in fire and a complete burn out. The tower was abandoned before the 1992-1995 Bosnian war. It was not used during the war and suffered no war damage.

== Description ==
The tower consists of the main residential-fortification building-tower, summer kitchen, 2 wells, and walls around the courtyard. The height of the tower to the lower edge of the roof is approximately 17.50 m, and to the top of the roof is approximately 23.00 m. The roof covering is pepper tile. In the middle of the roof is a mast-spike. Both eaves are with decorative edge boards and the edging of the eaves on the underside. From the lower roof is a chimney chimney. proved The room in the top floor below the final vault or gable is called a gutter. The tower in Bijela is an exception, because the floor above "ćemer" is not a "čatma", instead walls here are made of 70 cm thick stone, while on ground floor they are 152 cm.

There's a wall around the spacious courtyard. On the southern part of the wall is the entrance, the gate, and it's the only opening in the wall. The wall is approximately 2.50 m high on the inside and the height on the exterior vary. It is made of pressed broken stone and is topped by a draining wooden roof covered with "biber"-tiles. The fence wall is masonry with two faces in lime mortar, 130 cm thick, double plastered. Other facilities that were in the courtyard do not exist today.

== Literature ==
- Hamdija Kreševljaković, Naše starine godišnjak Zavoda za zaštitu spomenika kulture Bosne i Hercegovine, broj II, Sarajevo, 1954. godine -KULE I ODŽACI U BOSNI I HERCEGOVINI
