= Muslibegović House =

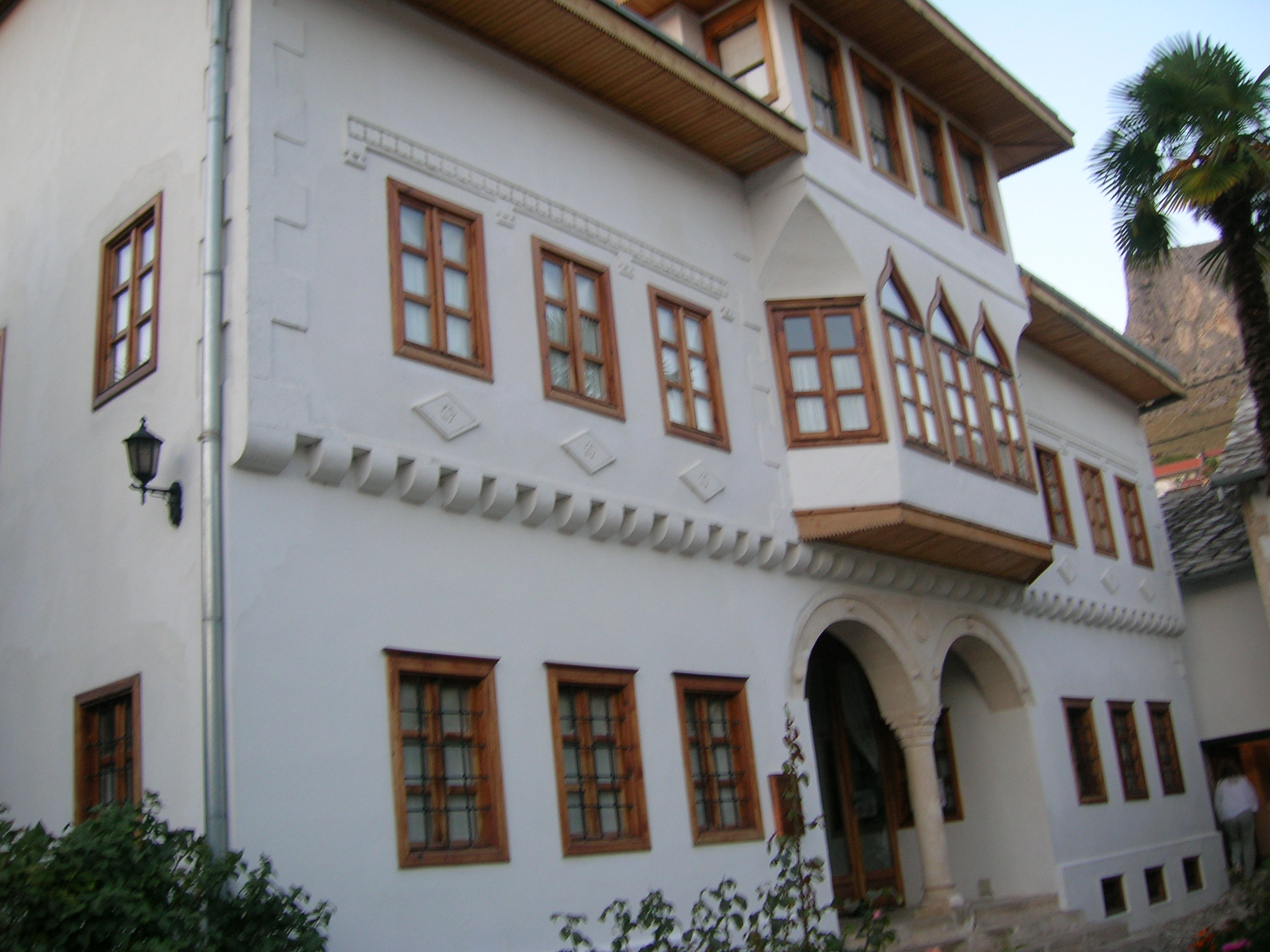
- Muslibegović House

General information
- Status: Museum & hotel
- Type: Traditional residential
- Architectural style: Ottoman
- Location: Brankovac mahala, Mostar, Bosnia and Herzegovina
- Coordinates: 43°20′41.88″N 17°48′38.62″E
- Current tenants: Museum & hotel privately owned by Muslibegović family
- Construction started: after 1750
- Owner: Mehmed Muslibegović (former); Tadžudin Muslibegović (current)

Other information
- Number of rooms: 12

Website
- muslibegovichouse.com

KONS of Bosnia and Herzegovina
- Official name: Muslibegović House
- Designated: 8 July 2004
- Reference no.: 09-02-1001/03-1

Muslibegović House is a national monument by KONS, and a museum located in Mostar, Bosnia and Herzegovina. The monument complex includes a residential building and two courtyards, including the surrounding walls with entrance gateways, and movable property. Some of its most valuable exhibits include the manuscript of the Qur'an made by Sami (pupil of Hajji Hafiz Muhamed Sevkije), levhas from 1855, and a decorated sabre from 1866. The residential complex of the Muslibegović family, located in Mostar's Brankovac mahala, dates from the second half of the 18th century.

The main house was extended in the period between 1871 and 1872, when two rooms were added on the ground floor and two additional ones on the upper floor. This was also the time when the mutvak (summer kitchen), larder/storeroom and cistern were constructed - as evidenced by the building permit written in Turkish and issued by the Mostar beledija (municipality). According to a former building owner, Muhamed Muslibegović, the wood carvings, which took two years to complete, were imported from other regions. The house was commissioned by Mehmed Muslibegović, who owned extensive land properties, particularly in Popovo polje.

The Muslibegović family house is considered one of the most significant examples of residential architecture of Ottoman-era Herzegovina. The complex has preserved its original residential use and ownership over the years.

Today, the section of a building is used as a hotel, and it consists of twelve bedrooms. Expedia Travel declared the Muslibegović House as one of the world's best accommodations for 2010.
