= Živorad Janković =

Yugoslav and Serbian architect

Živorad "Žika" Janković (1924–1990) was a Yugoslav and Bosnian architect.

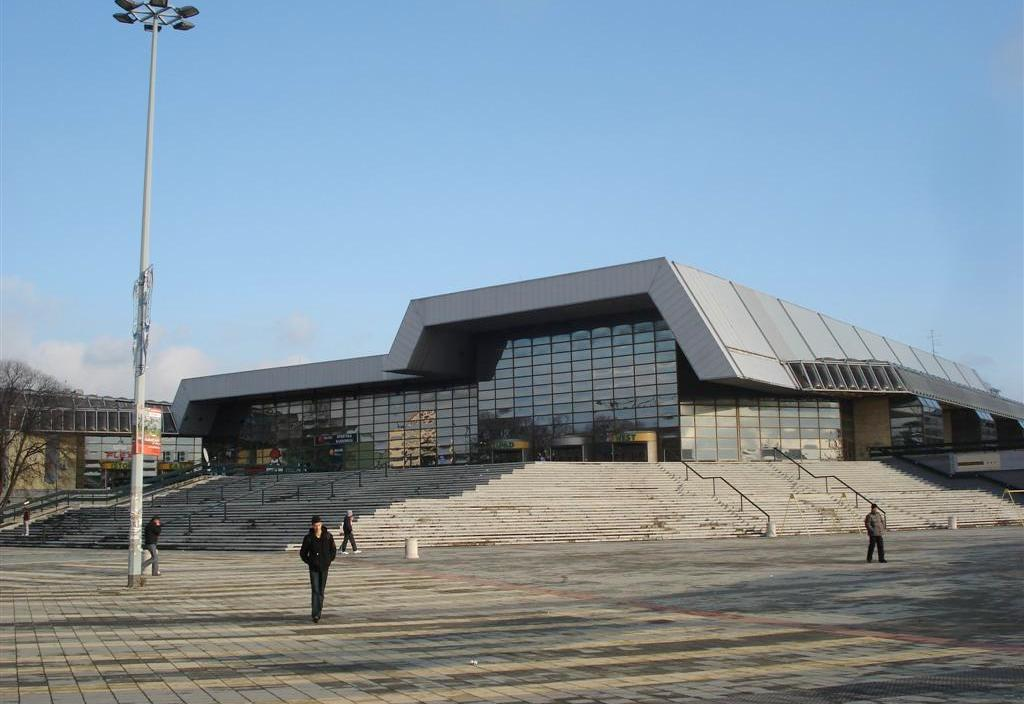
SPC Vojvodina

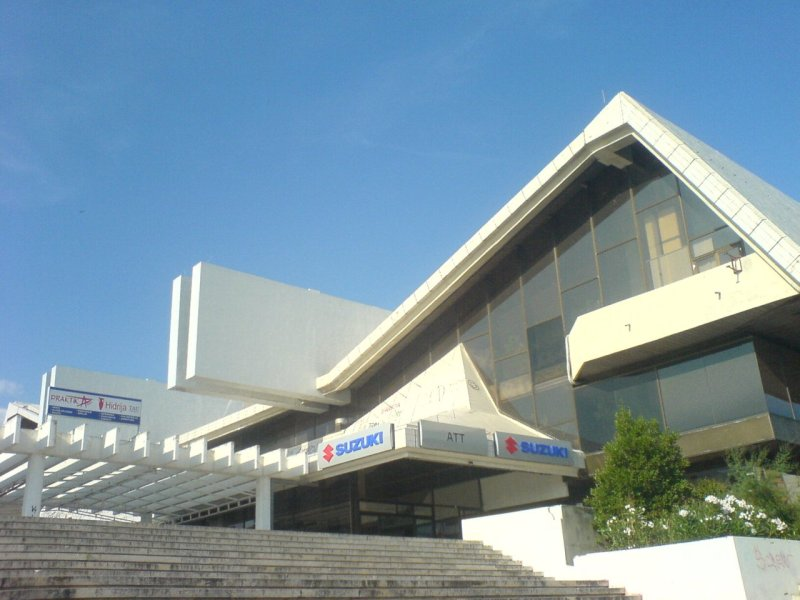
Arena Gripe

Skenderija

== Biography ==
Janković was born to ethnic Serbian family on August 19, 1924 in Višegrad, Yugoslavia. He finished his higher education in Sarajevo, and got a degree in architecture in Belgrade in 1950. From 1950 till 1952 he was a lecturer at the Faculty of Technology, University of Sarajevo. From 1952 till 1970 he worked for a successful private architectural practice ‘Dom’ in Sarajevo. During this period, he took two further courses abroad: one in Scandinavia in 1960 and another in 1963 at the University of Michigan, USA.

In October 1968 he was elected an Honorary Professor of Architecture at the School of Architecture, University of Sarajevo, where he taught a course in Foundations of Architectural Design. He was elected Chief City Planner for Sarajevo in May 1970, and he stayed in the post till October 1972. Contemporaneously, he continued his teaching at the School of Architecture in Sarajevo. In November 1972 he was awarded a permanent position. He became a full-time tenured professor in 1977, and was elected Dean of the University in 1981.

His major works include the Tobacco Factory in Sarajevo, Bosnia (Co-designer Muhamed Kadić); the Social Security building in Sarajevo, Bosnia, Energoinvest head office in Sarajevo, Bosnia; the Sport and Cultural Centre Skenderija in Sarajevo, Bosnia (co-designer H. Muhasilović); Universal-purpose arena and commercial centre “Gripe” in Split, Croatia (co-designer S. Rožić); Sport Centre “Vojvodina” in Novi Sad, Serbia (co-designer B. Bulić); and the Social and Sports Centre “Boro i Ramiz” in Priština, Kosovo (co-designer H. Muhasilović).

Numerous publications have noted Janković's contributions to contemporary Yugoslav architecture.

He was an active member of the Society of Architects of Bosnia and Herzegovina, and the Society of Architects of Yugoslavia. He was invited as a judge at numerous architectural, town-planning and art competitions throughout his career. He was a member of Town Planning Society in Sarajevo, Scientific Research Council, a member of Council for Scientific Advancement of Bosnia and Herzegovina and the Technical Sciences Council at Sarajevo University.

== Awards ==
His awards include the following:

- ‘27th July Award’ by the Architectural Council of Bosnia and Herzegovina in 1982
- ‘April 6th’ Award by Sarajevo City Council in 1961 ( with Prof. Muhamed Kadić) for the Tobacco Factory
- ‘April 6th’ Award by Sarajevo City Council in 1970 (with H. Muhasilović) for the Sports and Culture Centre Skenderija
- ‘Yugoslav National Award Borba’ in 1970, for the best architectural design in Yugoslavia for his work on the Sports and Cultural Centre Skenderija
- City Plaque from Pristina city for the Sport Centre “Boro i Ramiz” in 1978
- Gold Plaque of Split City Council in 1979 for Leisure Centre ‘Gripe’
- National Plaque of the Yugoslav National Chamber of Commerce in 1982 for the Leisure Centre ‘Vojvodina’ in Novi Sad, Serbia
- Gold and silver International Competition in Architecture in Köln for the last two leisure centres he designed

He was elected a member of highly esteemed ANUBiH (The Academy of Arts and Sciences of Bosnia and Herzegovina) in 1987. Only 100 academics have been awarded this honour in the past 60 years.

Janković died in 1990 in Sarajevo.
