= Odžak (Bugojno) =

Odžak Оџак
- Village
- Location within Bosnia and Herzegovina
- Country: Bosnia and Herzegovina
- Entity: Federation of Bosnia and Herzegovina
- Canton: Central Bosnia
- Municipality: Bugojno

Area
  - Total: 2.13 sq mi (5.51 km^{2})

Population (2013)
  - Total: 317
  - Density: 149/sq mi (57.5/km^{2})
- Time zone: UTC+1 (CET)
  - Summer (DST): UTC+2 (CEST)

Odžak (Serbian: Оџак) is a village in the municipality of Bugojno, Bosnia and Herzegovina.

== Demographics ==
According to the 2013 census, its population was 317.

Ethnicity in 2013
Ethnicity	Number	Percentage
Bosniaks	293	92.4%
Croats	21	6.6%
other/undeclared	3	0.9%
Total	317	100%
