= List of National Monuments of Bosnia and Herzegovina =

The National Monuments of Bosnia and Herzegovina include:

- sites, places, immovable and movable heritage of historical and cultural importance, as designated by the Commission to preserve national monuments of Bosnia and Herzegovina on the basis of Annex 8 to the Dayton Agreement; and
- world heritage sites in accordance to the UNESCO World Heritage Convention.

Below is the comprehensive list composed of Cultural-Historical National Monuments of Bosnia and Herzegovina and World Heritage Sites in Bosnia and Herzegovina.

This list (see list of all inscribed monuments in Commission's spread sheet for reference) is based on the commission's old website now maintained as an archive, which contains comprehensive data-base with Decision list, Petition list, Provisional and Tentative list, maps, images, together with other documents, descriptions, criteria and laws of all country's monuments, candidate monuments, rejected monuments, as well as those removed from list of protected properties, with browsable documents archive at:

- Archive – Commission's old website maintained as an archive – in English (also available in Bosnian/Croatian/Serbian).

Also, both old (archive) and new website maintains many other information and documents, the criteria, laws, news on activities, virtual exhibitions, galleries, etc., all browsable at:

- New website – Commission to preserve national monuments – in English;
  - also available in Bosnian/Croatian/Serbian – choose language here: Commission – Language;
- Archive – Commission to preserve national monuments – old website maintained as an archive, available in Bosnian/Croatian/Serbian and English.

For the UNESCO criteria see the Selection criteria.

Natural heritage sites and the tentative list of World Heritage Sites of Bosnia and Herzegovina are not included, instead these are elaborated within scope of separate lists, along with other specific lists created on the basis of monuments category, type or subject.

== List of monuments ==
Type	Name	Location	Created date/era	Declared monument date	Image	Notes
Bridge	Goat's Bridge	Sarajevo	C16	declared		Spans the Miljacka.
Bridge	Šeher-Ćehaja Bridge	Sarajevo	1585	declared		Spans the Miljacka.
Bridge	Latin Bridge	Sarajevo	1798	declared		Spans the Miljacka.
Bridge	Ćumurija Bridge	Sarajevo	1886	declared		Steel road bridge over the Miljacka.
Bridge	Čobanija Bridge	Sarajevo	1887	declared		Iron footbridge over the Miljacka.
Bridge	Skenderija Bridge	Sarajevo	1893	declared		Also called Ajfel as it was designed by Eiffel. Bridge spans the Miljacka.
Bridge	Roman bridge in Ilidža	Ilidža	16th C	declared		Spans the Bosna.
Bridge	Stara Ćuprija Glavatičevo	Glavatičevo		declared		Spans the Upper Neretva.
Bridge	Stara Ćuprija	Konjic	1683	declared		Spans the Upper Neretva, rebuilt in 2009.
Bridge	Stari Most	Mostar	1567	declared		Pedestrian bridge over the Neretva, rebuilt in 2004.
Bridge	Kriva Ćuprija	Mostar	just before 1567	declared		Pedestrian bridge over the Radobolja, reconstructed in 2004.
Bridge	Karađoz-begova Ćuprija	Blagaj		declared		Spans the Buna.
Bridge	Inat Ćuprija	Stolac		declared		Spans the Bregava in the center of Stolac.
Bridge	Djevojačka Ćuprija	Stolac		declared		Spans the Bregava.
Bridge	Mustaj-begova Ćuprija	Klepci		declared		Mustaj-begova Ćuprija, also Klepci Ćuprija, spans the Bregava.
Bridge	Ćuprija na Šuici	Šujica		declared		Spans the Šuica.
Bridge	Stara Ćuprija Duman	Livno		declared		Spans the Bistrica.
Bridge	Ćuprija Studenci	Ljubuški		declared		Spans the Studenci.
Bridge	Veliki Most	Perići, Grude		declared		Spans the Tihaljina/Trebižat.
Bridge	Ovčiji Brod	Nevesinje		declared		Spans the Zalomka.
Bridge	Arslanagić Bridge	Trebinje	17th c.	2006		Spans the Trebišnjica.
Bridge	Bridge over Žepa	Žepa		declared		Spans the Žepa (river).
Bridge	Mehmed Paša Sokolović Bridge	Višegrad	1577	declared		Spans the Drina.
Building	Vijećnica	Sarajevo	1891	declared		Burned down by Serb incendiary shells at the beginning of the Bosnian War, reconstructed and reopened in 2014.
Building	Gimnazija Mostar	Mostar		declared		Damaged during Bosnian War, repaired afterwards.
Building	Sarajevo main railway station	Sarajevo		declared		Damaged during the Bosnian War, repaired afterwards.
Building	Morića Han	Baščaršija	1551	declared		Morića Han is the only surviving Ottoman era Inn in Baščaršija, Sarajevo.
Building	Bezistan	Baščaršija		declared		Gazi Husrev-beg's Bezistan in Baščaršija, Sarajevo.
Building	Brusa bezistan	Baščaršija		declared		Brusa Bezistan in Baščaršija, Sarajevo.
Building	National Museum of Bosnia and Herzegovina	Sarajevo	1888	declared		Established in 1888, originally conceived around 1850, building expanded in 1913.
Building	Historical Museum of Bosnia and Herzegovina	Sarajevo	1963	2012		Award-winning building designed in the 20th century by architect Boris Magaš.
Building	Sarajevo National Theatre	Sarajevo	1921	declared		Sarajevo National Theatre.
Religious-Islamic	Čelebića mosque in Donja Bijenja	Nevesinje	early 16th century	declared		
Religious-Islamic	Ferhat Pasha Mosque	Banja Luka	16th century	declared		The mosque was dynamited at the start of the Bosnian War, repaired afterwards and reopened in 2016.
Religious-Catholic	Sacred Heart Cathedral	Sarajevo	1889	declared		Sarajevo Sacred Heart Cathedral.
Religious-Catholic	Fojnica Franciscan Monastery	Fojnica	1668	declared		Fojnica Franciscan Monastery.
Religious-Catholic	Kreševo Franciscan Monastery	Kreševo	1524	2003		Kreševo Franciscan Monastery.
Religious-Catholic	Trappist Mariastern Abbey	Banja Luka	1869	7 May 2004		
Religious-Orthodox	Church of St. George, Sopotnica	Goražde	1454	5 November 2008		
Religious-Orthodox	Dobrićevo Monastery	Bileća	15th-16t c.	17 May 2006		Built in the 15th or 16th century by the river Trebišnjica and then moved in 1964 upstream to Orah village
Religious-Orthodox	Gomionica Monastery	Banja Luka	16th century	20 January 2006		
Religious-Orthodox	Rmanj Monastery	Martin Brod	16th century	2007		
Religious-Orthodox	Vozuća Monastery	Vozuća	16th century	2004		
Religious-Orthodox	Žitomislić Monastery	Čapljina	1606	declared		Destroyed during the Bosnian War, repaired afterwards.
Religious-Judaic	Sarajevo Synagogue	Sarajevo	1902	declared		The Sarajevo Synagogue remains the only functioning synagogue in Sarajevo today.
Religious-Judaic	Il Kal Grande	Sarajevo	1930	declared		Heavily damaged in World War II, reconstructed as a culture center and theater afterwards.
Religious-Judaic	New Temple, Sarajevo	Sarajevo	19c.?	declared		New Sephardic synagogue, today art gallery.
Religious-Judaic	Old Temple, Sarajevo	Sarajevo	1587	declared		Old Sephardic synagogue, today Museum of Jews of Bosnia and Herzegovina.
Fortification	Blagaj Fortress	Blagaj		6 December 2003		
Fortification	Dobor fortress	Modriča	14th century	March 2005		
Fortification	Drijeva	Gabela				Toll and market-town of the Kingdom of Bosnia, sometimes called Nerenta.
Fortification	Klobuk fortress	Trebinje				
Fortification	Ključ Castle	Gacko				
Fortification	Ljubuški Fortress	Ljubuški				
Fortification	Počitelj Citadel	Počitelj				
Fortification	Srebrenica Fortress	Srebrenica				Market-town (trg) and mines of Srebrenica were defended by the fortress of Srebrenica
Fortification	Stolac fortress	Stolac		2003		Stolac fortress, also known as "Vidoški Grad".
Clock Tower	Počiteljska sahat-kula	Počitelj		declared		Počitelj Clock Tower is a part of architectural ensemble.
Towers and odžaks	Redžep-pasha's odžak	Žepa		declared		Tower and/or odžak.
Towers and odžaks	Smajilagić odžak	Livno		declared		Tower and/or odžak.
Towers and odžaks	Šurković odžak	Glavatičevo, Župa Komska, Upper Neretva		declared		Tower and/or odžak.
Towers and odžaks	Fazlagića odžak	Gacko		declared		Tower and/or odžak.
Towers and odžaks	Gradaščević odžak	Bijela, Brčko	18C	declared		Citadel, tower and/or odžak.
Towers and odžaks	Rustempašić Tower	Odžak, Bugojno				Citadel, odžak and/or tower, historical building
Fortification	Captain's Tower	Bihać	16C	declared		Citadel, tower and/or odžak.
Underground structure	ARK/D-0	Konjic	cca 1950–80	declared		Herzegovina-Neretva Canton, Konjic Municipality.
Necropolis	Radimlja	Stolac	15th to 16th century	declared		Herzegovina-Neretva Canton, Stolac Municipality
Necropolis	Stećak necropolis Ričina	Posušje	15th century	declared		Posušje Municipality
Necropolis	Batalo's Mausoleum	Travnik		declared		Batalo's stećak.
Necropolis	Hrvoje Vukčić crypt	Jajce		declared		Hrvoje Vukčić's crypt.
Cemeteries	Moshe Danon's shrine	Stolac		declared		Moshe Danon chief Rabbi of Sarajevo (1815–1830) tombstone in a shape of stećak.
Cemeteries	Old Jewish cemetery, Sarajevo	Sarajevo	1630	30 August 2004		It is the largest Jewish cemetery in SE Europe, and second largest sepulchral complex in Europe
Cultural landscape	Plava Voda	Travnik		declared 26 April 2013		Plava Voda wellspring with Old Town of Travnik.
Architectural ensemble public buildings complex	Gazi Husrev-beg Library	Sarajevo	1537	declared year?		Gazi Husrev-beg Library as part of a Faculty of Islamic Sciences.
Architectural ensemble residential complex	Vratnik	Sarajevo		2005		Fortified city Old Town Vratnik, built between the 17th and 18th cen AD, is modern-days Vratnik neighborhood of Sarajevo.
Architectural ensemble residential complex	Počitelj	Počitelj		declared		Herzegovina-Neretva Canton, Čapljina Municipality.
Architectural ensemble residential complex	Džidžikovac	Sarajevo	1946–1959	2008		Sarajevo Canton, Centar Municipality.
Natural-architectural ensemble	Vjetrenica & architectural ensemble of Zavala	Zavala		declared		Ravno Municipal, west end of Popovo polje.
Natural-architectural ensemble	Jajce	Jajce		declared		Jajce municipality.
Natural-architectural ensemble	Blagaj	Blagaj		declared		Blagaj – Mostar municipality, Hercegovina-Neretva kanton.
Natural-architectural ensemble	Stolac	Stolac		2003		Stolac – Stolac municipality, Hercegovina-Neretva kanton (county).
Traditional household/ residential complex	Despić House	Sarajevo				Sarajevo, Bosnia and Herzegovina.
Traditional household/ residential complex	Svrzo's House	Sarajevo				Sarajevo, Bosnia and Herzegovina.
Traditional household/ residential complex	Muslibegović House	Mostar				Mostar, Hercegovina-Neretva kanton, Bosnia and Herzegovina.
Traditional household/ residential complex	Biščević House	Mostar				Mostar, Hercegovina-Neretva kanton, Bosnia and Herzegovina.
Traditional household/ residential complex	Begovina	Stolac				Stolac municipality, Hercegovina-Neretva kanton, Bosnia and Herzegovina.
Traditional household/ residential complex	Velagićevina	Blagaj				Blagaj-Mostar municipality, Hercegovina-Neretva kanton, Bosnia and Herzegovina.
Industrial architectural ensemble	Old Marijin Dvor power station	Marijin Dvor	1895			Old electric power station at Hiseti, Marijin Dvor neighborhood in Sarajevo, Bosnia and Herzegovina, opened on 3 April 1895.
Industrial architectural ensemble	Old Hrid power station	Sarajevo	1918			Old Hrid hydro-electric power station in Sarajevo, Bosnia and Herzegovina.
Movable property	Sarajevo Haggadah	National Museum of BiH				Sarajevo, Bosnia and Herzegovina.
Movable property	Zmijanje embroidery	Zmijanje				Zmijanje embroidery – Zmijanje village, Manjača mountain i Bosnia and Herzegovina.
Movable property	Portrait of Bishop fra Grgo Ilić	Franciscan monastery Kreševo				Kreševo, Bosnia and Herzegovina.
Intangible cultural heritage	Picking of Iva Grass on Ozren Mountain	Ozren mountain				Ozren mountain, Bosnia and Herzegovina.

== See also ==
- List of Intangible Cultural Heritage elements in Bosnia and Herzegovina
- List of World Heritage Sites in Bosnia and Herzegovina
- List of fortifications in Bosnia and Herzegovina
