= Muhamed and Reuf Kadić =

Yugoslav architects

Muhamed and Reuf Kadić were two important Yugoslav architects, who after studying in Prague were among the first to introduce the ideas of modernist architecture in Sarajevo in the interwar period.

While in Prague, Muhamed and Reuf Kadić "clearly belonged to a faction that was closer to the Club for Old Prague (yes to Modernism, but not at the cost of demolishing old Prague)." They maintained the same attention to taking existing historical architecture into account once back in Sarajevo.

== Muhamed Kadić ==
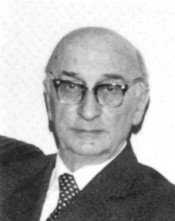
Muhamed Kadić circa 1970

Muhamed Kadić was born on 10 April 1906 in Mostar. He enrolled at the Faculty of Architecture in Prague in 1926, and a year later he was joined by his younger brother Reuf. In Prague, as young students, based on the achievements of cubism and neoplasticism, they strived to create a free and pure geometric architectural form. In addition, they were socially engaged, so that due to revolutionary agitation, Muhammad was expelled from Czechoslovakia in 1932, and at the same time he was forbidden to return to his homeland. With the change of political circumstances, the brothers returned to Sarajevo. He graduated in Prague only in 1939.

He devoted most of his working life to the planning and construction of industrial and agricultural facilities. He published the book "Old farmhouses in Bosnia and Herzegovina" (Starinska seoska kuća u Bosni i Hercegovini, Sarajevo 1967).

He won the ZAVNOBiH Award in 1982, the 6 April Award of the City of Sarajevo and the 27 July Award in 1978. He became a corresponding member of the Academy of Sciences and Arts of BiH in 1973, and a full member two years later. Kadić died on 26 May 1983 in Sarajevo at the age of 77.

== Reuf Kadić ==
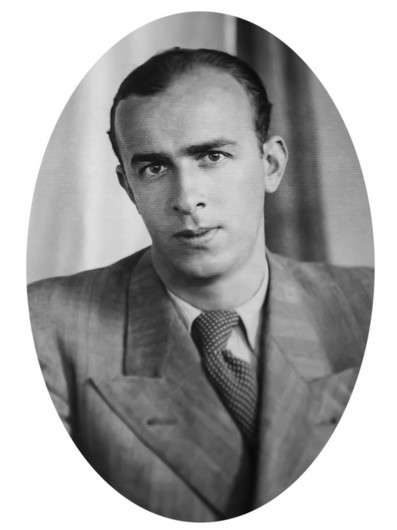
Reuf Kadić circa 1940

Born on 25 May 1908 in Sarajevo, Reuf Kadić began his studies in Prague in 1927, but, together with his brother, he often returned to Sarajevo, where he worked for architectural bureaus earning the money needed for schooling. In 1930, the authorities confiscated his passport because of his liberal political ideas.

During his studies he occasionally came to Sarajevo and worked in the construction company "Rad", and accumulated more than three years of such work until 1934. He worked on various construction sites and participated in the design of the city hospital in Brcko, municipal offices, apartments and buildings customs offices in Metković, the Deutz and Benau buildings and the Radulović house in Sarajevo, reinforced concrete bridges in Bihać, Tuzla and Mostar, and participated in a tender for the Belgrade Stock Exchange Palace project.

After re-obtaining his passport, he returned to Prague where he completed his studies in 1934. In November 1935, he got employed at the Vakuf Directorate in Sarajevo, where he worked until 1942, designing and realizing over fifty projects. In the period 1951-74 he stopped working at the National Design Institute and began his pedagogical work at the Sarajevo Civil Engineering High School.

In 1963, Reuf Kadić transferred from the Civil Engineering Technical High School to Energoinvest, to the Supervision and Investment Service, and in 1965 he became the director for capital construction of the Banja Luka Cellulose and Viscose Factory. From his retirement in 1967 until his sudden death in Šibenik on 6 August 1974 aged 66, he occasionally worked in architecture, mainly on the revision / review of architectural projects.

== Architectural achievements ==
In 1940, brothers Reuf and Muhamed Kadić founded their own independent design studio in Sarajevo, so together they participated in the development of projects. This studio remained active until 1942. In the same year, the studio of the Kadić brothers was dissolved and they moved to Dubrovnik. They then temporarily suspended their professional design careers until the end of World War II.

In the first post-war period, the Design Institute of the People's Republic of Bosnia and Herzegovina played an important role in the design and construction of facilities in Sarajevo. It mainly brings together designers with construction experience. The backbone consisted of Muhamed and Reuf Kadić, who put their previous design experience into the function of renovation.

Their buildings, which are characterized by pure functional forms, have been preserved to this day. They left behind a number of achievements that represent the avant-garde of architectural works.

- The residential and business building of Vakuf Čokadži Sulejman, on Trg Austrije, whose construction was completed in 1939, according to the project of Reuf Kadić. It is listed as National Monument since 2011.
- The residential and business building of Vakuf Hovaj Kemaludin (Mekteb building), on Ferhadija. Built in modernist style as a cornerstone of rectangular floor plan, at the ground floor the building hosts business premises (including the famous Sarajevo confectionery "Ramiz") and residential flats upstairs, with façades covered with green ceramics, on which cantilever protrusions with striped windows and wide glazed loggia surfaces appear. At the time of construction, the building was one of the most representative and best-equipped residential buildings in the city and had telephone, electricity and gas installations, while heating was provided by solid fuel stoves. It is listed as National Monument since 2012.
- The building of the Pension Fund from 1941 to 1943, in Alipašina (Hamze Hume 2 / Titova) designed by Muhamed Kadić. A complex building in volumes (with a variety of prismatic and semicylindrical forms) and in façades, with a round corner with well-proportioned windows, making it "the most successful treatment of a corner building in Sarajevo in the period between the two world wars." It is deemed to "blend harmoniously with the existing historical fabric with its Ottoman and Austro-Hungarian architecture, implicitly plac[ing] the [Kadić brothers] among the proponents of Modernism who took existing historical architecture into account"
- The residential complex on Džidžikovac, from the immediate post-war period, with 7 buildings made in 1948 and one from 1959, according to a joint project of the Kadić brothers. "The complex contains three linear residential blocks each consisting of a number of three-storey interconnecting buildings that cascade along the existing topography. In addition, the three blocks are surrounded by open green space that integrates the building into the existing site forming a sense of a unified complex. At the end of each block is a set of semi-circular terraces suspended by receded columns that become the signature feature of this project." The course of construction and construction technology of the Džidžikovac complex in winter conditions is part of the history of Bosnian architecture. The construction took place with the help of so-called closed scaffolding, first wooden, and later metal prefabricated, within which it was built in all weather conditions.
- The JAT Skyscraper on Ferhadija, an architectural work by Reuf Kadić, although according to some sources a joint work of the two Kadić brothers. The 12-story building, whose construction had started before the second world war, was completed in 1947.
- The Croatian Lodge "Herceg Stjepan Kosača" in Mostar, (Radnički dom, Dom kulture, Dom omladine, Dom mladih), built in 1960 according to the project of Reuf Kadić.

== Gallery ==
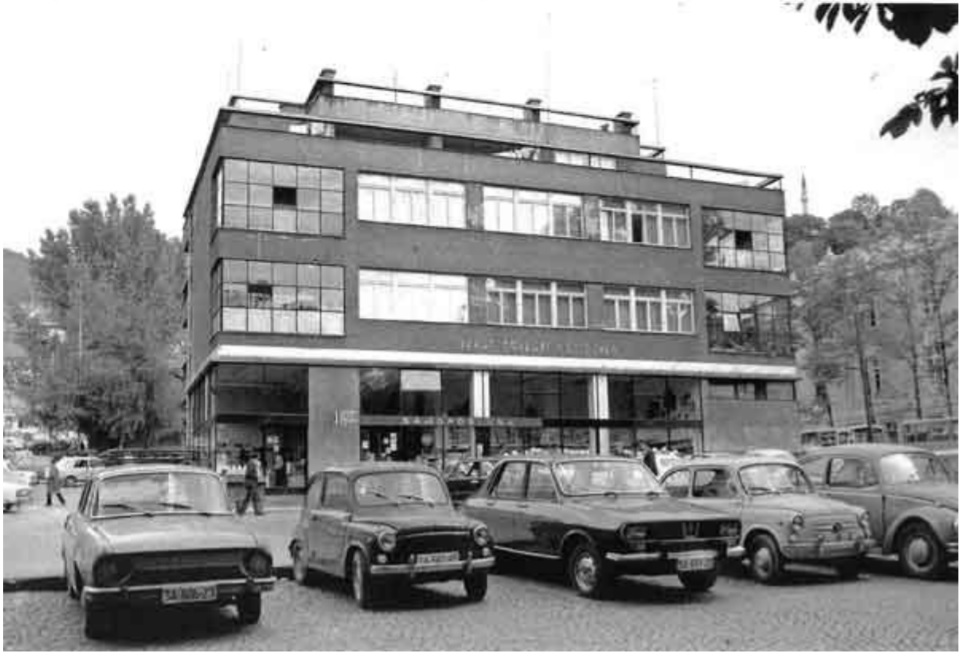
Vakuf Čokadži Sulejman, 1935-1939

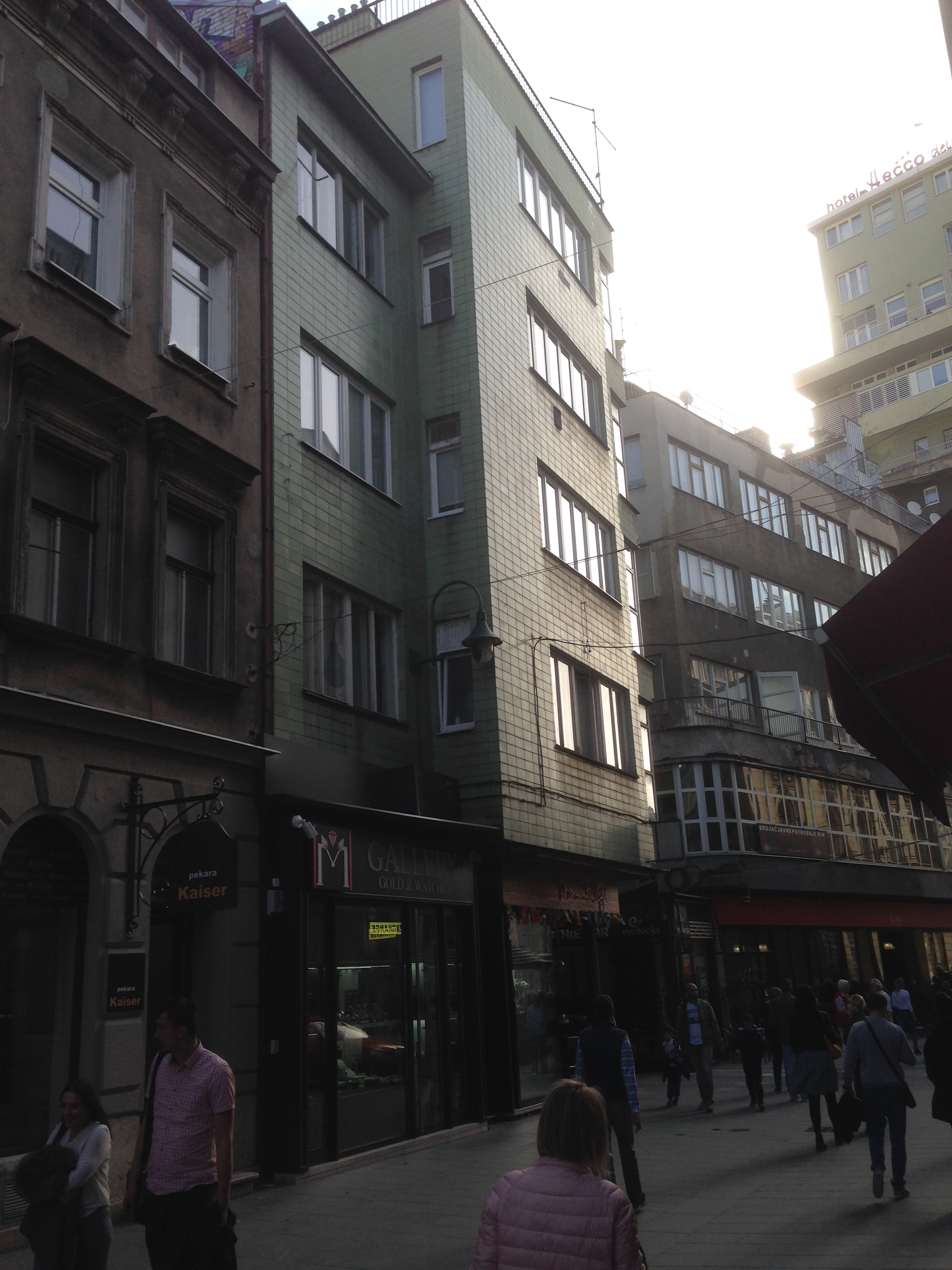
Mekteb building on Ferhadija, by Reuf Kadić, 1942

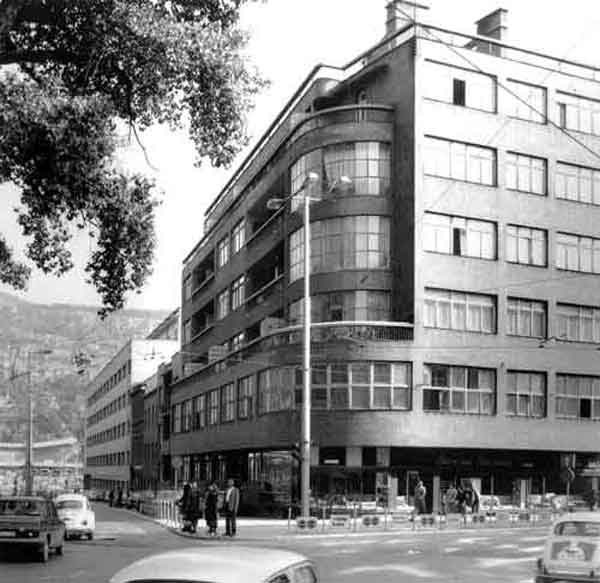
Pension Fund building, 1941-1943

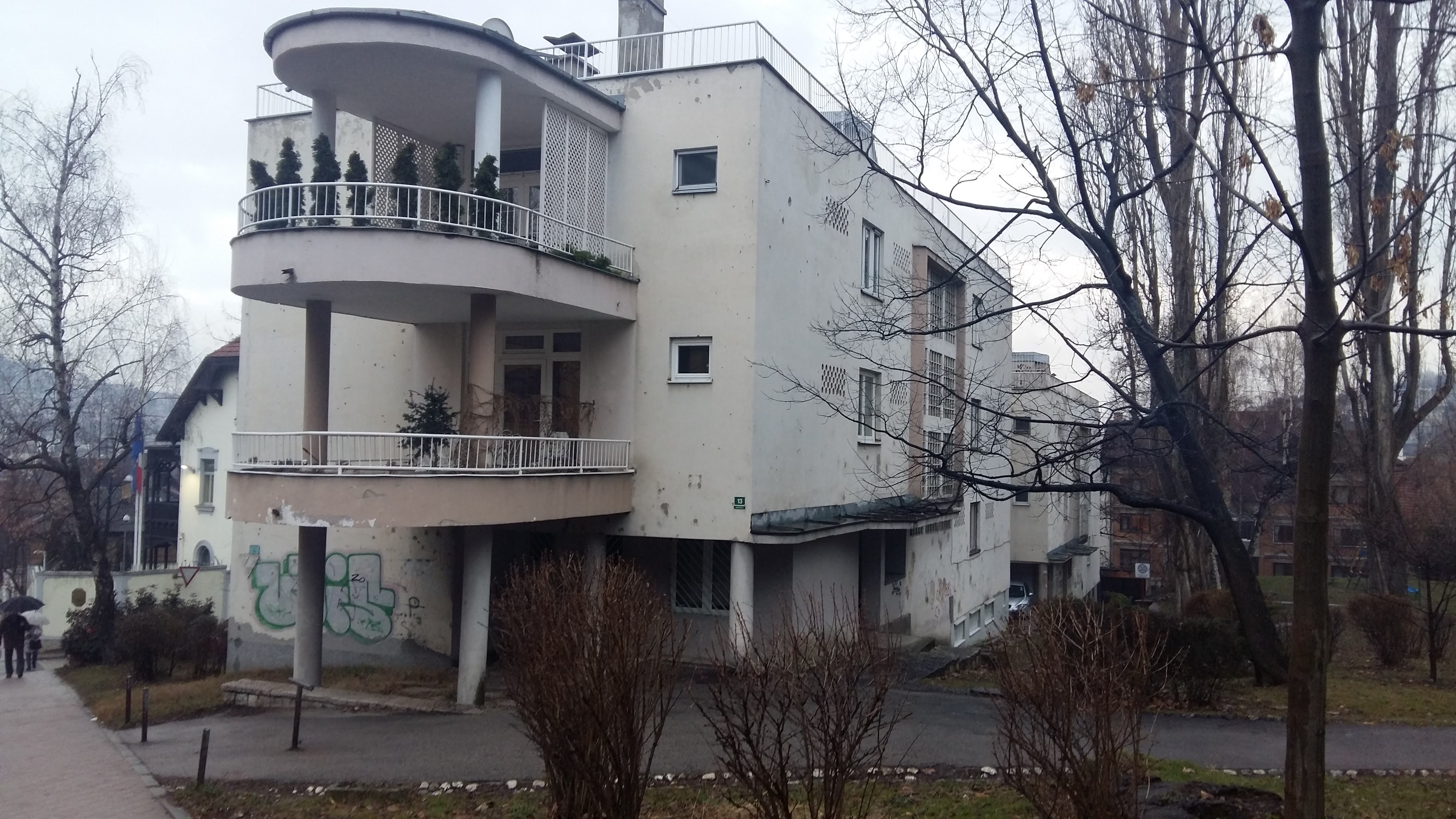
Džidžikovac complex, 1947-1948

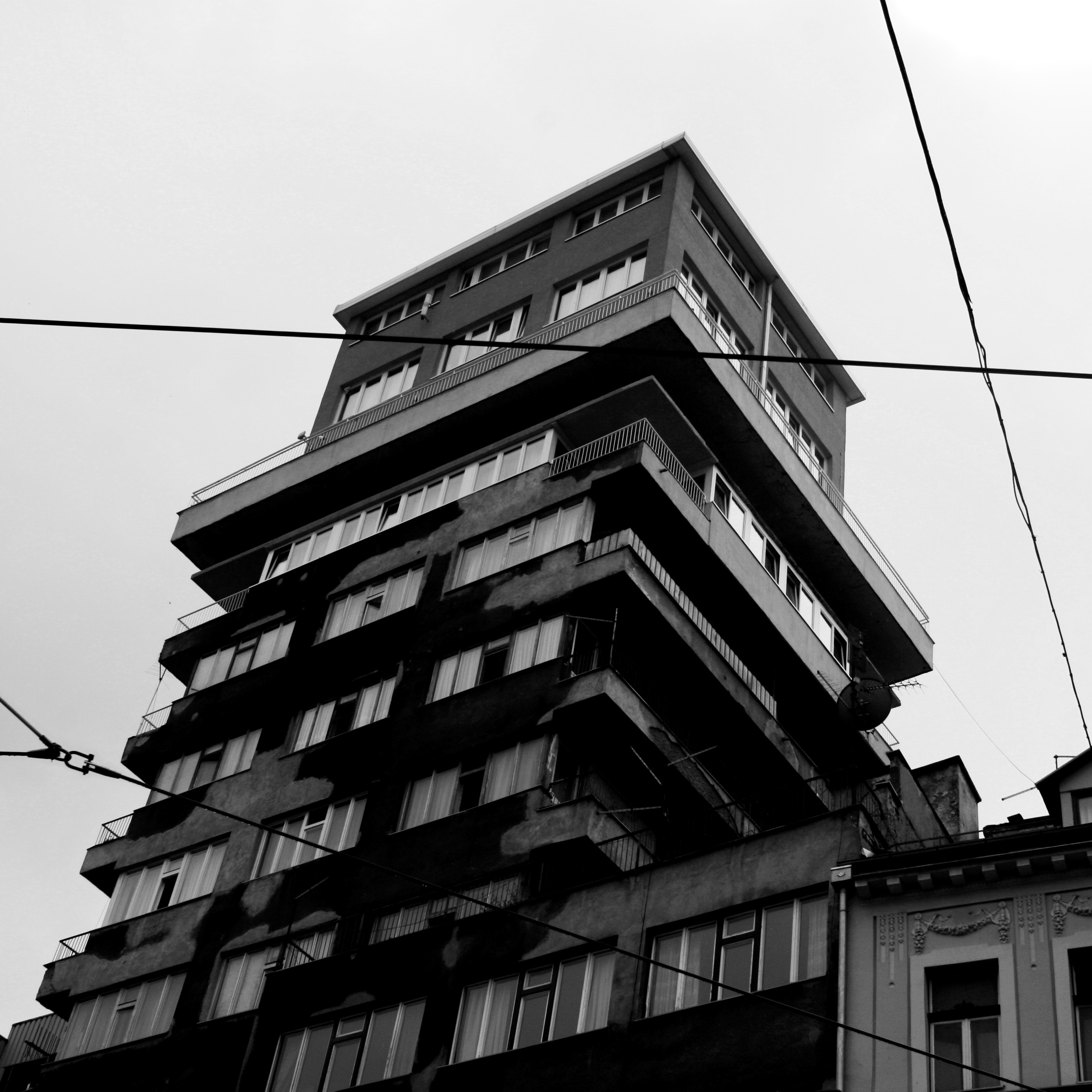
JAT skyscraper

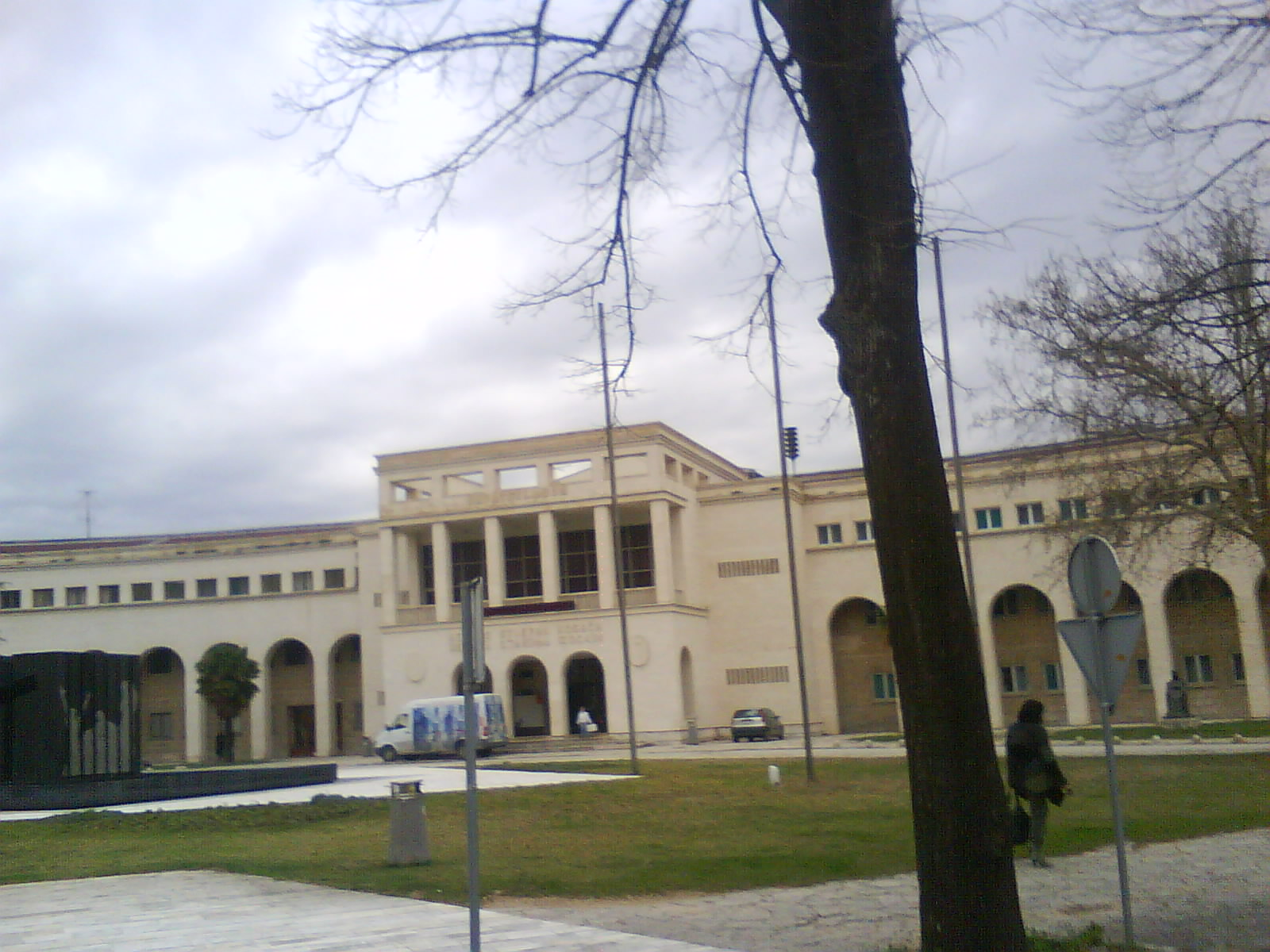
Croatian Lodge "Herceg Stjepan Kosača", 1960

== Bibliography ==
- Emir Kadić - Arhitekt Reuf Kadić i počeci moderne arhitekture u Bosni i Hercegovini. Sarajevo, 2010.
- Živorad Janković - Muhamed Kadić – život i djelo, Akademija nauka i umjetnosti BiH, Bošnjački institut Fondacija Adila Zulfikarpašića, Sarajevo.
- Alija Bejtić -Ulice i trgovi Sarajeva. Sarajevo: Muzej grada Sarajeva 1973. godine
- Nedžad Kurto - Sarajevo 1492-1992, Oko, Sarajevo.
- Predrag Milošević - Arhitektura u kraljevini Jugoslaviji (Sarajevo 1918-1941). Foča: Prosvjeta, 1997.
- Štraus, Ivan (1977). Nova bosanskohercegovačka arhitektura. Sarajevo : Svjetlost. OCLC 3708713.
