= Radobolja =

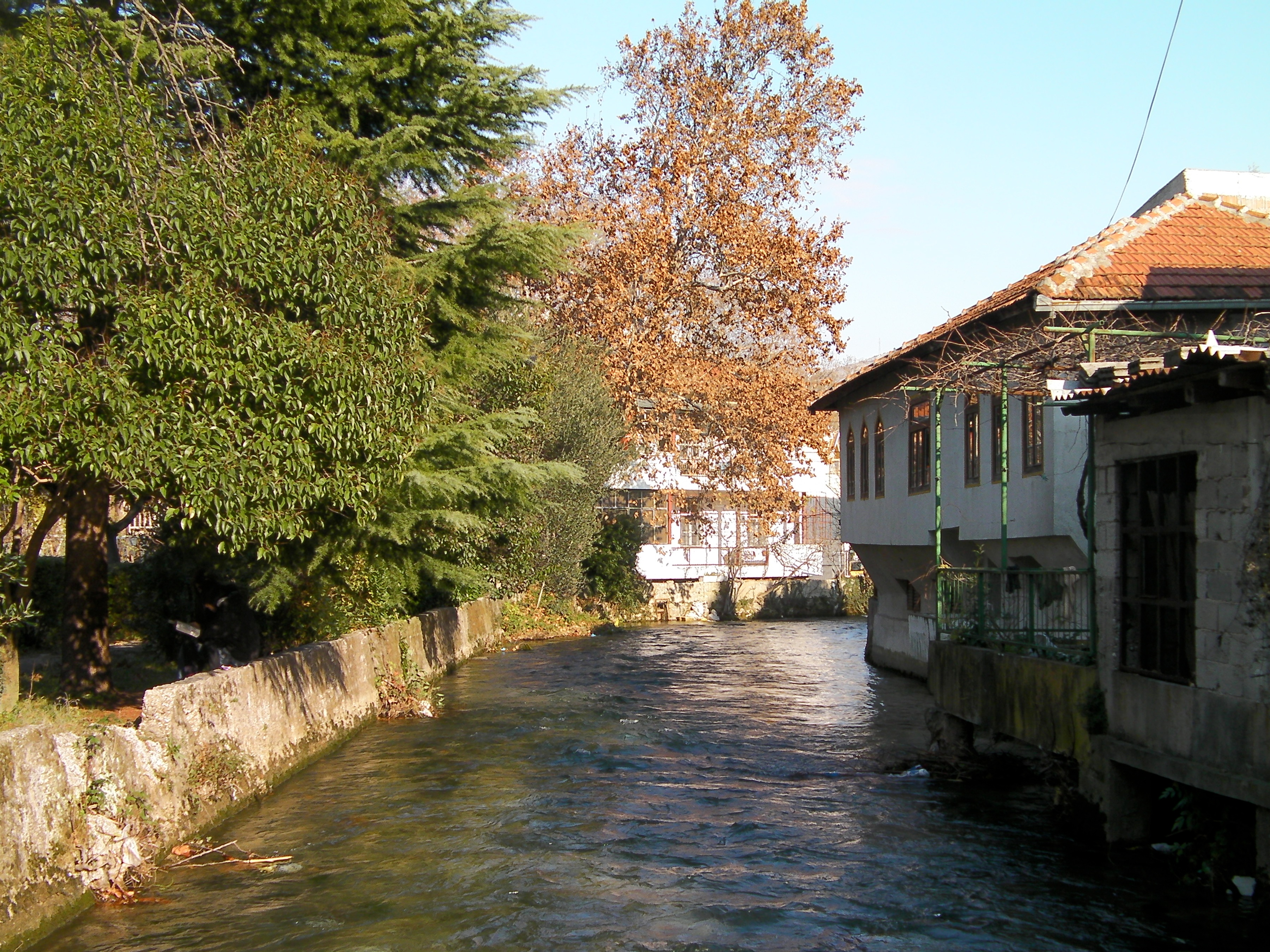
- Radobolja River

- Location within Bosnia and Herzegovina

Location
- Country: Bosnia and Herzegovina

Physical characteristics
- Source
  - location: Mikuljača hill in Mostar's suburb of Ilići
- Mouth
  - location: Neretva
  - coordinates: 43.3367°N 17.8150°E
- Length: 5 km (3.1 mi)

Basin features
- Progression: Neretva→ Adriatic Sea

Radobolja is a river in Bosnia and Herzegovina. It is five kilometers long and its spring is located below the Mikuljača hill in Mostar's suburb of Ilići. Radobolja flows through Mostar and flows into the Neretva River near the Old Bridge. During the Ottoman rule water from Radobolja was used for irrigation and drinking, however today's Radobolja is polluted due to discharge of waste-water.

== Gallery ==
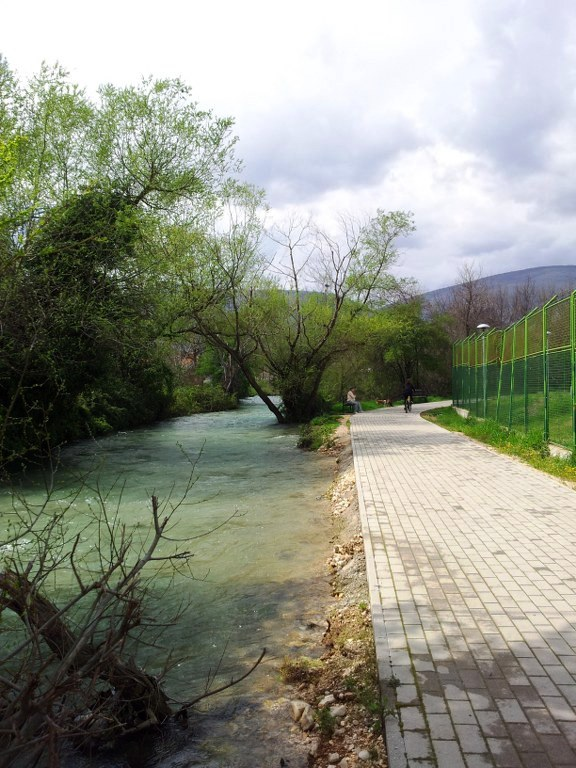
Radobolja river in Mostar

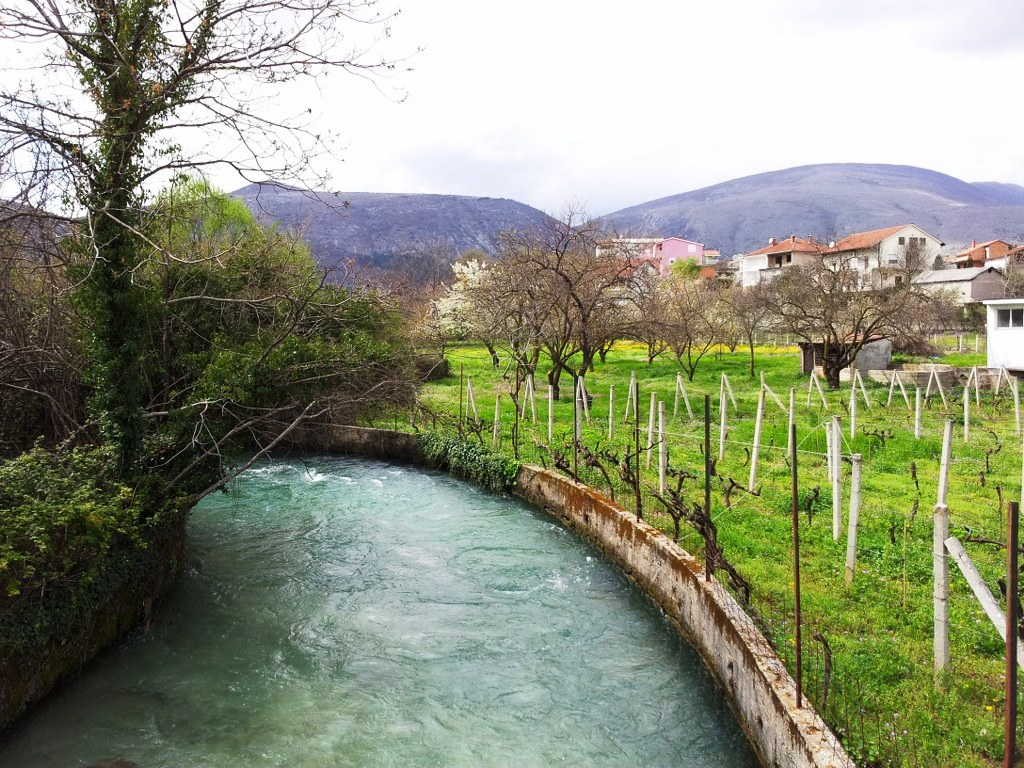
Ilići and river Radobolja in Mostar

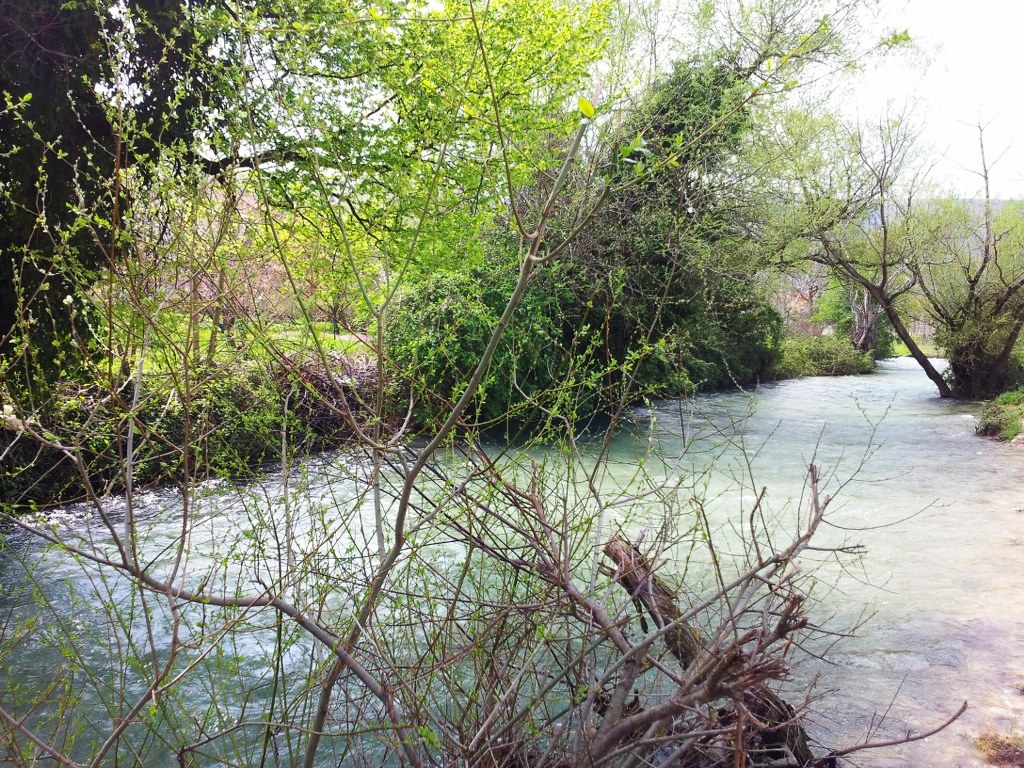
Radobolja river in Ilići, Mostar

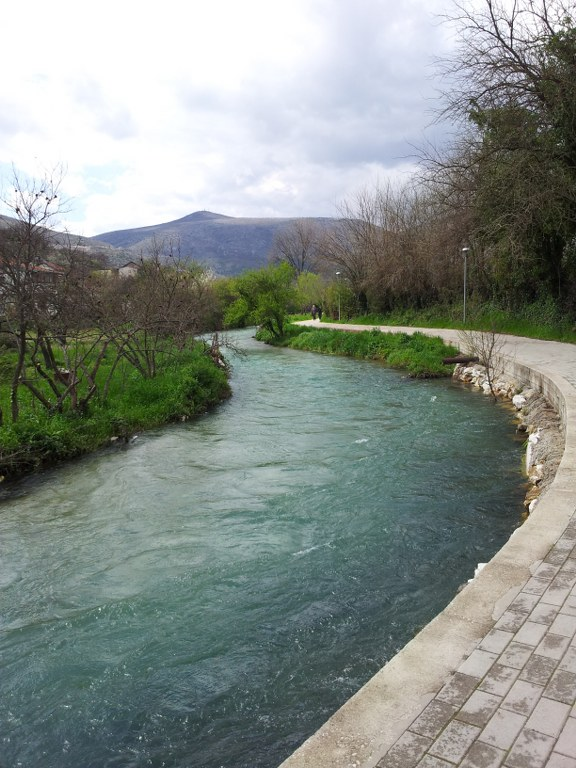
Radobolja river in Ilići, Mostar

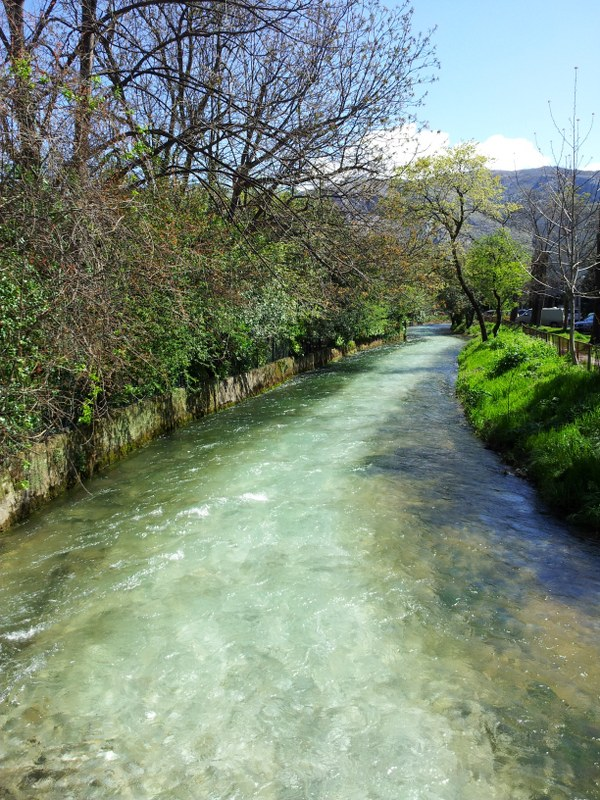
Radobolja river in Mostar
