= Bišće =

Bišće was a medieval Bosnian župa. Its location was in Hum (Humska zemlja), and its most important towns were residential places of Bosnian rulers and nobility.

== History ==
Župa Bišće is the oldest area of Hum (Humska zemlja). It stretched through the Mostar valley, on the left side of the Neretva river. It is bordered on the west by the river Neretva, where across the Neretva, on its right bank, župa of Večenike (Večerić) existed. The northern border consists of the mountain massifs of Prenj, in the župa of Neretva. In the northeast and the east it borders with the Velež and the župa of Nevesinje respectively, and in the south with the župa of Dubrava. Two areas can be identified in Bišće, Bijelo polje in the north and Bišće or Bišće polje in the south. In the župa of Bišće the most prominent fortified town was Blagaj fortress, and in Bijelo polje there was a fortress of unknown name above the villages of Prigrađani and Podgorani.

Blagaj fortress and town is a town with the oldest tradition in the wider area. It is located on a hill above the river Buna source, on the site of the Roman city of Bona and today's settlement Blagaj. Bišće and Blagaj were the residences of Bosnian rulers and nobles. The Kosačas had a court here. The road from Dubrovnik and Drijeva passed through Bišće, and then continued through the area of today's Mostar to the north along the Neretva to Vrapča (today Vrapčići), Biograd and Konjic towards the interior of Bosnia. Kosačas had the custom and taxation stations on the Buna, in Bišće and Polje.

In the 15th century, the presence of Franciscans in the area of Bišće was recorded. Their monastery (conventus) is mentioned in Bišće under different names (Bišće, Zahum and Novi). From the area of Bišće, young men go to coastal towns to work and learn crafts, as evident from the example of certain Božićko Račić from 1415.

== Bišće in medieval documents ==
Although less often, the people of Bišće are also involved in credit trade, as shown by document from April 1446. Certain Sotko Tvrdišić from Bišće, with the guarantee of the painter Ivan a.k.a. Crnča, borrowed 48 perpers from Petar Pažić. In November 1435, certain Stjepko Bjelutović from Bišće (Lat. Stiepchus Bielutouich de Bisza) undertook a three-year service with Milobrad Jaćković.

Bišće in Dubrovnik's archive documents:

=== 1380 ===
- “Cheruatin Brayacouich de Bisçe in Minori consilio factus fuit civis Ragusii, qui iuravit fedelitatem et facere omnes factiones tam reales quam personales”.(Date: 4 February 1380). (Source: Mihailo Dinić, Odluke veća Dubrovačke republike, Knjiga 1, Srpska akademija nauka, Zbornik za istoriju, jezik i književnost srpskog naroda, Treće odeljenje 15, Beograd 1951, p. 15.)

=== 1394 ===
- “Ego Millaua Obradi Xoranouich de Bissiçe parcium Bossine etatis XI annorum vel circha confiteor quod de mea bona voluntate presente Radouino fratre meo michi ad hoc consentiente loco me et operas meas magistro Albertino de Chamurata de Padua fisico salariato Ragusii presenti et conducenti me ad standum cum eo ... usque ad decem annos proxime futuris”.(Source: Državni arhiv u Dubrovniku, Serija - Diversa Cancellariae, Svezak - XXXI, Folija - 119 verso (Datum: 12 October 1394)

=== 1408 ===
- “Radogna Ratchouich de Bisça promictit et se obligat locando se et operas suas ser Iacobi de Ruborio de Vigilliis stare secum ... quinque annis continuis ... Pro quo Radogna ... Bogisa Bogutchouich de Bisza se constituit plezium".(Source: Državni arhiv u Dubrovniku, Serija - Diversa Cancellariae, Svezak - XXXVII, Folija - 92 verso (Datum: 21 July 1408)

=== 1415 ===
- "Bositchus Racich de Bisce locando se et operas suas promisit et se solemniter obligauit ser Marrino quondam Zini de Dabie de Dulcigno presenti et stipulanti stare et habitare cum eo hinc ad unum annum proxime futuris et ab ipso non recedere usque ad dictum temporis ... Et pro ipso Bositcho Radete Ratchouich se constituit fideuissorem et principalem solutorem".

== Bibliography ==
- Kurtović, Esad (2009). Bišće i Blagaj u doba vojvode Sandalja Hranića Kosače - Proceedings, scientific conference Prirodno-graditeljska cjelina blagajske tekije i vrela Bune 10 May 2007. Mostar: Islamic Community Mostar.
- Državni arhiv u Dubrovniku, Serija - Diversa Cancellariae, Svezak - XL, Folija - 255 (Date: 29 December 1415).
