= Kosor Bridge =

Bridge in Blagaj, Bosnia and Herzegovina

Kosor Bridge Kosorska ćuprija
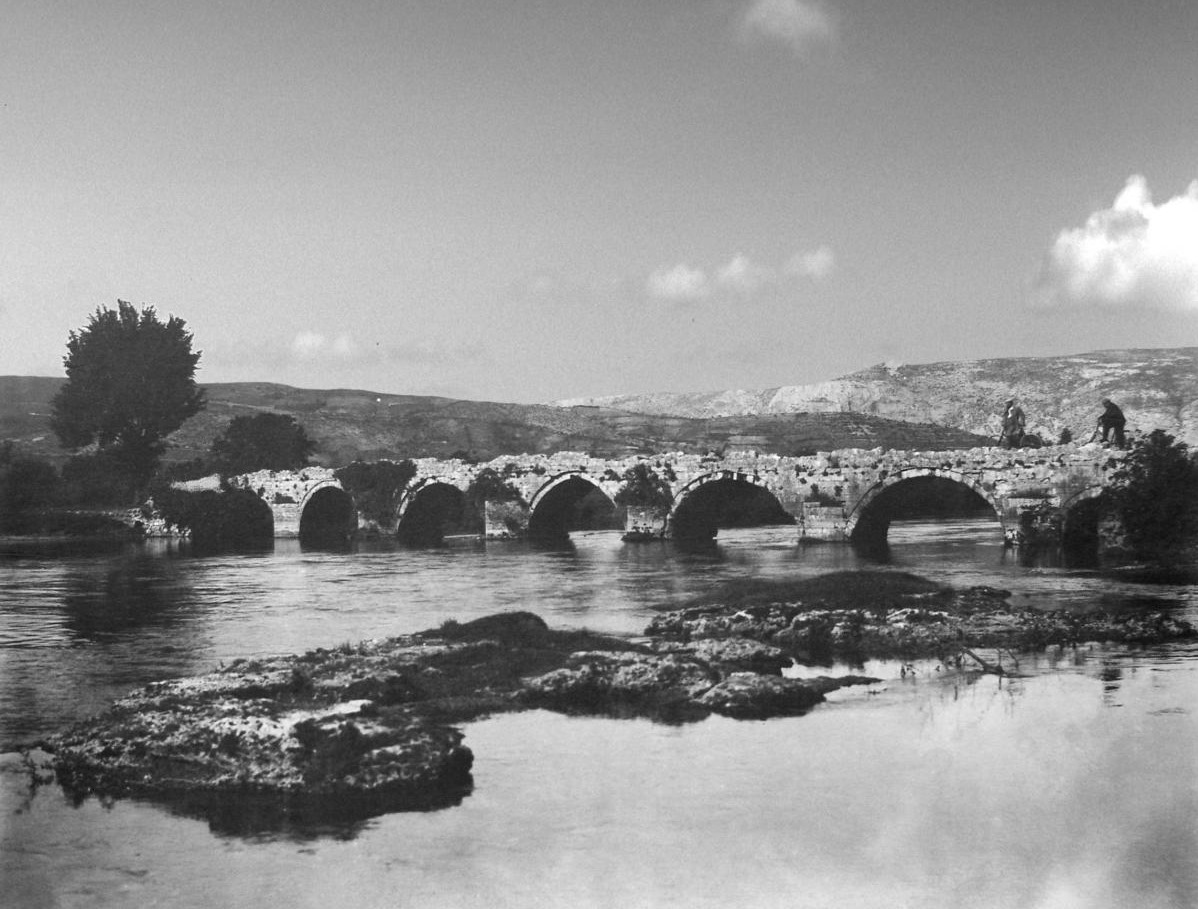
- Bridge over the Buna in Kosor
- Coordinates: 43°14′45″N 17°51′26″E
- Crosses: Buna
- Locale: Kosor; Bosnia and Herzegovina
- Official name: Stone bridge in Kosor
- Other name(s): Danijal Pasha's Bridge
- Named for: Kosor settlement
- Owner: state
- Maintained by: KONS;
- Heritage status

KONS of Bosnia and Herzegovina
- Official name: The stone bridge in Kosor, the site and remains of a historical building
- Type: Category I cultural heritage
- Criteria: A; B; C iii, iv; F iii.
- Designated: April 3, 2014 (?th session; 02-2.3-59/14-22)
- Reference no.: 3829
- State: National Monuments of Bosnia and Herzegovina
- Earlier protected as: Kosorska ćuprija na rijeci Buni u Bišću polju kraj Mostara
- Next upstream: -
- Followed by: -

Characteristics
- Design: Stone-arch bridge
- Material: Limestone
- Total length: -
- Width: -
- Height: -
- Water depth: -
- Traversable?: no
- No. of spans: 7 (1 preserved)

History
- Constructed by: Danijal-pasha or Karađoz-bey
- Built: 16th century (probably in place of earlier Roman bridge)
- Rebuilt: no

Statistics

Stone Bridge in Kosor, or Kosor Bridge, also Danijal Pasha's Bridge, (Bosnian: Kosorska ćuprija), is the former bridge in the settlement of Kosor, in the City (former Municipality) of Mostar, Bosnia and Herzegovina. The bridge spanned the river Buna. On April 3, 2014, it was declared a national monument of Bosnia and Herzegovina.

== History and description ==
The remains of the bridge are located on the Buna River, not far from its confluence with the Neretva, in the area of the Kosor settlement.

In the literature, different data are given about the time of the creation of this bridge. Some believe that the bridging of the Buna near its mouth was created during the time of the Romans.

Others are of the opinion that the bridge was built by Karađoz, who had already built the bridges, such as Karađoz Bridge over the Buna in Blagaj and Stara Ćuprija bridge over the Neretva in Konjic, and many other edifices, such as Karađoz Bey Mosque in Mostar.

For the first time, this bridge was mentioned by the Ottoman travel writer Evliya Çelebi and recorded it under the name Danijal Pasha's Bridge on the Buna. At one time, this was the largest bridge in Herzegovina. In 1945, the Germans demolished it with a explosives during their retreat from the region, and today there is a new concrete bridge in its place.

The total length of the bridge was 57 m, width over 4 m, with abutments connected by thirteen strong stone semicircular arches. The remains of this bridge are inscribed national monument, which consist of the remains of six bridge pillars and an arched structure located on the western (right) bank of the Buna River.

== Buna Bridge ==
Buna Bridge with 14 stone-arches was located less than 2 kilometers downstream from Danijal-pasha's Bridge or Kosorska ćuprija.

Buna Bridge

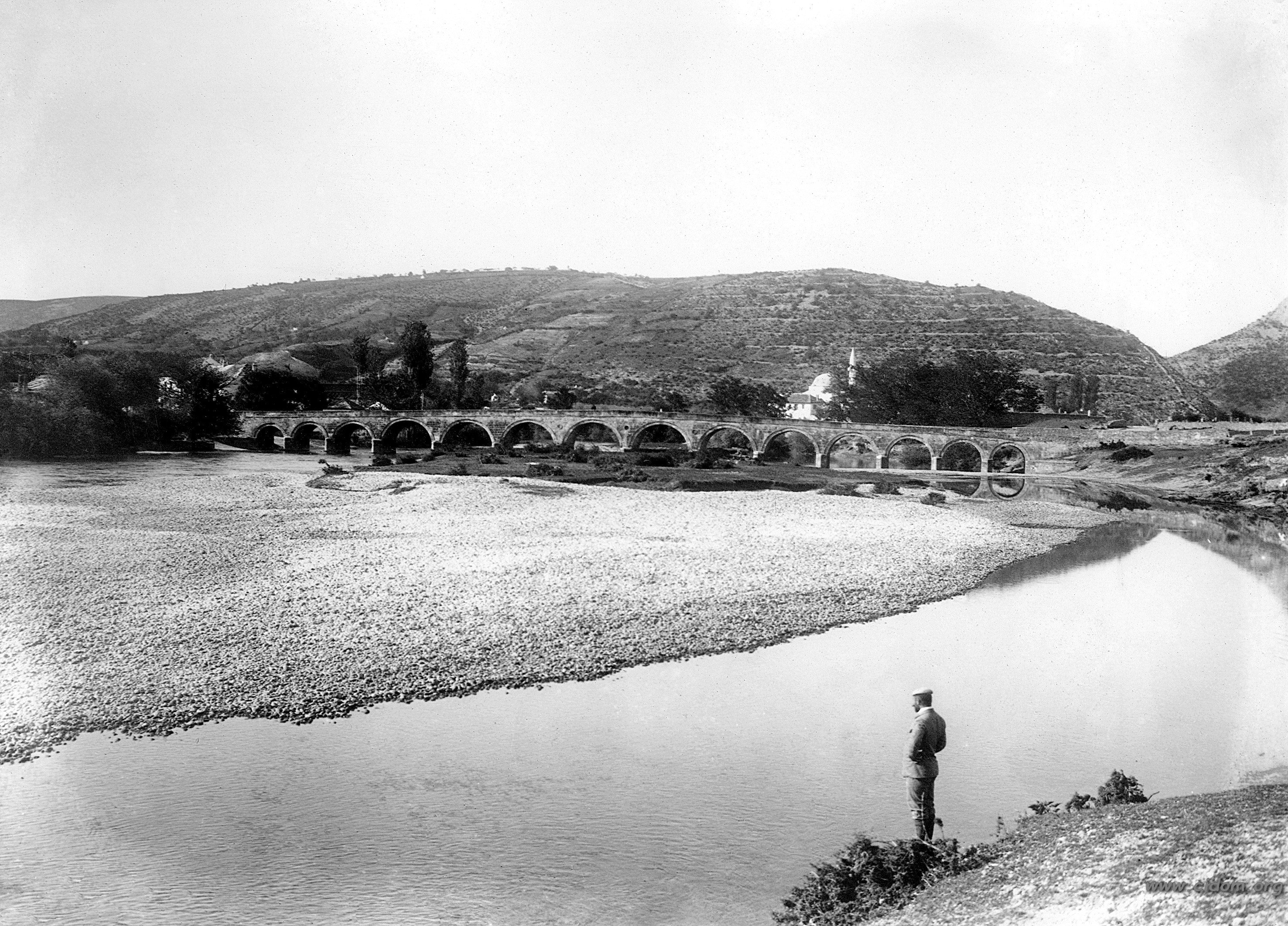

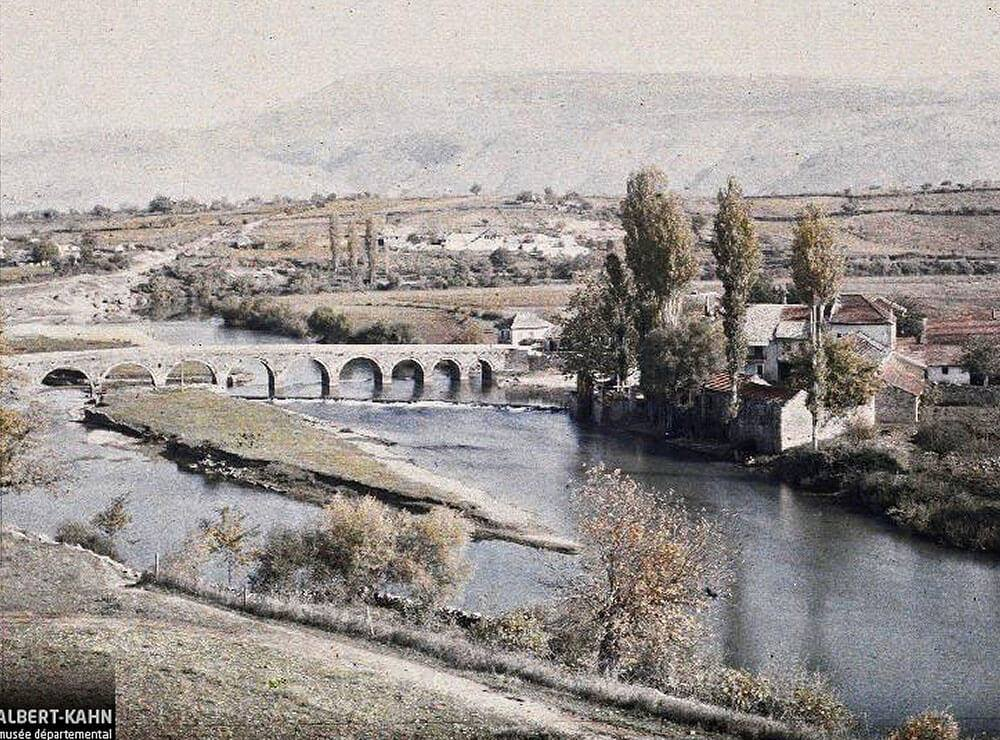

== See also ==
- Stari Most
- Klepci bridge
- List of bridges in Bosnia and Herzegovina
- List of National Monuments of Bosnia and Herzegovina
