= List of bridges in Bosnia and Herzegovina =

This list of bridges in Bosnia and Herzegovina lists bridges of particular historical, scenic, architectural or engineering interest. Road and railway bridges, viaducts, aqueducts and footbridges are included.

== Historical and architectural interest bridges ==
Name	Bosnian	Distinction	Length	Type	Carries Crosses	Opened	Location	Canton	Ref.
Mustaj-bey Bridge	Mustaj-begova ćuprija/Ćuprija Klepci	National monument	0 m (0 ft)	Masonry; 1 semi-circular arch	Footbridge; Bregava	1517	Klepci; 43.099543°N 17.721776°E	Herzegovina-Neretva	
Kosor Bridge	Kosorska ćuprija	National monument	0 m (0 ft)	Masonry stone-arch	Footbridge; Buna	16th c.	Kosor	Herzegovina-Neretva	
Stari Most rebuilt in 2004	Stari most	Span : 27.3 m (90 ft); World Heritage Site; National monument	30 m (98 ft)	Masonry; 1 pointed arch	Footbridge; Neretva	1567	Mostar; 43°20′14.0″N 17°48′54.1″E	Herzegovina-Neretva	
Mehmed Paša Sokolović Bridge	Most Mehmed-paše Sokolovića	Conception by Mimar Sinan; World Heritage Site; National monument	179 m (587 ft)	Masonry; 11 pointed arches	Drina	1577	Višegrad; 43°46′56.6″N 19°17′16.8″E	Višegrad	
Drvenija Bridge	Drvenija	only wooden bridge spanning Miljacka in downtown Sarajevo today		Wood	Miljacka	1898	Sarajevo; 43°51′31.5″N 18°26′02.7″E	Sarajevo	
Šeher-Ćehaja Bridge	Šeher-Ćehajina ćuprija	National monument		Masonry; 4 semi-circular arches (5 originally)	Miljacka	1586	Sarajevo; 43°51′31.5″N 18°26′02.7″E	Sarajevo	
Arslanagić Bridge	Arslanagića most	National monument	80 m (260 ft)	Masonry; 2 semi-circular main arches	Trebišnjica	16th century	Trebinje; 42°42′52.8″N 18°21′14.4″E	Trebinje	(Note: The bridge, originally built 5 kilometers upstream from its current location, was partly destroyed during the Second World War. It was moved and rebuilt identically in 1972 following the construction of a hydroelectric dam.)
Galečka Ćuprija	Galečka ćuprija	National monument	42 m (138 ft)	Masonry; 1 semi-circular arch	Šuica river	-	Šuica; 43.822881°N 17.182657°E	Kupres	
Goat's Bridge	Kozija ćuprija	National monument	42 m (138 ft)	Masonry; 1 semi-circular arch	Miljacka	16th century	Sarajevo; 43°51′13.0″N 18°27′26.2″E	Sarajevo	
Kriva Ćuprija	Kriva ćuprija	National monument World Heritage Site	00 m (0 ft)	Masonry; 1 semi-circular arch	Radobolja river	1558	Old Town Mostar; 43.336834°N 17.813117°E	Mostar	
Ovčiji Brod	Ovčiji Brod	National monument		Masonry; 3 semi-circular arches	Zalomka	16th century	Bratač; 43°14′34.0″N 18°13′49.7″E	Republika Srpska	
Roman bridge in Ilidža	Rimski most	National monument	40 m (130 ft)	Masonry; 7 semi-circular arches	Bosna (river)	16th century	Ilidža; 43°49′53.7″N 18°17′10.0″E	Sarajevo Canton	
Stara Ćuprija rebuilt in 2009	Stari most u Konjicu	National monument		Masonry; 6 pointed arches	Neretva	1683	Konjic; 43°39′03.9″N 17°57′46.0″E	Herzegovina-Neretva	
Latin Bridge	Latinska ćuprija	Site of the assassination of Archduke Franz Ferdinand of Austria by Gavrilo Princip in 1914, which began the July Crisis that ultimately led to the outbreak of World War I. National monument		Masonry; 4 semi-circular arches	Miljacka	1799	Sarajevo; 43°51′27.5″N 18°25′44.2″E	Sarajevo	
Bridge on the Neretva	Most na Neretvi	Destroyed during the Case White, rebuilt and redestroyed for the film Battle of Neretva. National monument	78 m (256 ft)	Truss; Steel	Neretva	1888	Jablanica; 43°39′15.0″N 17°45′44.5″E	Herzegovina-Neretva	
Customs Bridge rebuilt in 1996	Carinski Most			Arch; Concrete deck arch	Neretva	1900	Mostar; 43°20′53.5″N 17°48′37.7″E	Herzegovina-Neretva	
Festina lente (bridge)	Festina lente		38 m (125 ft)	Beam bridge Steel	Footbridge; Miljacka	2012	Sarajevo; 43°51′22.7″N 18°25′03.6″E	Sarajevo	

== Major road and railway bridges ==
This table presents the structures with spans greater than 100 meters (non-exhaustive list).

! scope=col |Name	Bosnian	Span	Length	Type	Carries Crosses	Opened	Location	Canton	Ref.
Ostrožac Suspension Bridge	Viseći most Ostrožac	207 m (679 ft)		Suspension; Steel deck, concrete pylons	R437; Jablaničko lake Neretva		Ostrožac; 43°41′19.6″N 17°49′16.4″E	Herzegovina-Neretva	
Babina Rijeka Viaduct	Vijadukt Babina rijeka	167 m (548 ft)	405 m (1,329 ft)	Box girder Prestressed concrete 119+167+119; 109+163+109	A1 motorway Babina Rijeka		Zenica; 44°12′42.5″N 17°56′00.5″E	Zenica-Doboj	
Rača Bridge		150 m (490 ft)		Truss; Steel; 125+150+125	Railway bridge Sava	1934	Brodac Donji–Sremska Rača; 44°54′34.7″N 19°17′49.3″E	Republika Srpska (International border BiH and SRB)	
Bridge of Europe (Sava)		150 m (490 ft)	400 m (1,300 ft)	Box girder Steel; 125+150+125	M18; Sava	2010	Brodac Donji–Sremska Rača; 44°54′34.7″N 19°17′48.7″E	Republika Srpska (International border BiH and SRB)	
Sava River Bridge (Sremska Raca)		150 m (490 ft)		Box girder Steel; Twin bridges 90+150+90	Sarajevo-Belgrade Motorway; Sava	2021	Brodac Donji–Sremska Rača; 44°54′34.7″N 19°17′52.3″E	Republika Srpska (International border BiH and SRB)	
Vranduk 2 Viaduct under construction	Most Vranduk 2	150 m (490 ft)	340 m (1,120 ft)	Box girder Prestressed concrete 95+150+95	A1 motorway Bosna (river)		Vranduk; 44°18′12.9″N 17°54′37.0″E	Zenica-Doboj	
Hercegovina Bridge	Most Hercegovina	147 m (482 ft)(x5)	945 m (3,100 ft)	Box girder Prestressed concrete 105+5x147+105	A1 motorway Neretva	2024	Počitelj; 43°08′57.3″N 17°44′10.6″E	Herzegovina-Neretva	
Island Bridge (Jablanica)		140 m (460 ft)	180 m (590 ft)	Box girder Steel	Road bridge Jablaničko lake Neretva		Jablanica; 43°41′44.9″N 17°43′53.0″E	Herzegovina-Neretva	
Županja-Orašje Bridge	Most Orašje-Županja	134 m (440 ft)	792 m (2,598 ft)	Box girder Steel; 85+134+85	M1.8; Sava	1968	Orašje–Županja; 45°02′16.9″N 18°42′09.4″E	Posavina (International border BiH and CRO)	
Svilaj Bridge	Most Svilaj	130 m (430 ft)	660 m (2,170 ft)	Box girder Composite steel/concrete Twin bridges 100+130+100	A1 motorway Sava	2019	Donji Svilaj–Svilaj; 45°06′20.6″N 18°18′53.3″E	Posavina (International border BiH and CRO)	
Brčko Railroad Bridge		126 m (413 ft)	775 m (2,543 ft)	Truss; Steel; 92+126+92	Railway bridge Sava	1968	Brčko–Gunja; 44°52′05.8″N 18°49′51.9″E	Posavina (International border BiH and CRO)	
Studenčica Viaduct	Most Studenčica	120 m (390 ft)(x3)	555 m (1,821 ft)	Box girder Prestressed concrete 80+3x120+70	A1 motorway Studenčica (river)	2015	Studenci; 43°09′34.0″N 17°38′27.6″E	West Herzegovina	
Trebižat Viaduct	Most Trebižat	120 m (390 ft)	380 m (1,250 ft)	Box girder Prestressed concrete 80+120+80	A1 motorway Trebižat (river)	2015	Studenci; 43°09′10.8″N 17°37′04.9″E	West Herzegovina	
Vranduk 1 Viaduct under construction	Most Vranduk 1	120 m (390 ft)(x2)	390 m (1,280 ft)	Box girder Prestressed concrete 80+2x120+70 70+2x120+70	A1 motorway Bosna (river)		Vranduk; 44°18′28.8″N 17°54′24.8″E	Zenica-Doboj	
Gazelle Bridge		100 m (330 ft)	300 m (980 ft)	Box girder Steel; V-shaped legs	Sarajevo–Ploče railway Neretva	1966	Jablanica; 43°38′47.6″N 17°45′50.8″E	Herzegovina-Neretva	

== Notes and references ==
- Notes
- Nicolas Janberg. "International Database for Civil and Structural Engineering". Structurae.com.
- Others references

== See also ==
- List of National Monuments of Bosnia and Herzegovina
- Transport in Bosnia and Herzegovina
- Roads in Bosnia and Herzegovina
- Rail transport in Bosnia and Herzegovina
- Geography of Bosnia and Herzegovina
