= Kosor =

Kosor may refer to:

- Kosor (surname), a surname
- Kosoř, a village and municipality in the Czech Republic
- Kosor, Mostar, a village just south of Mostar, Bosnia and Herzegovina
