= Bunica (river) =

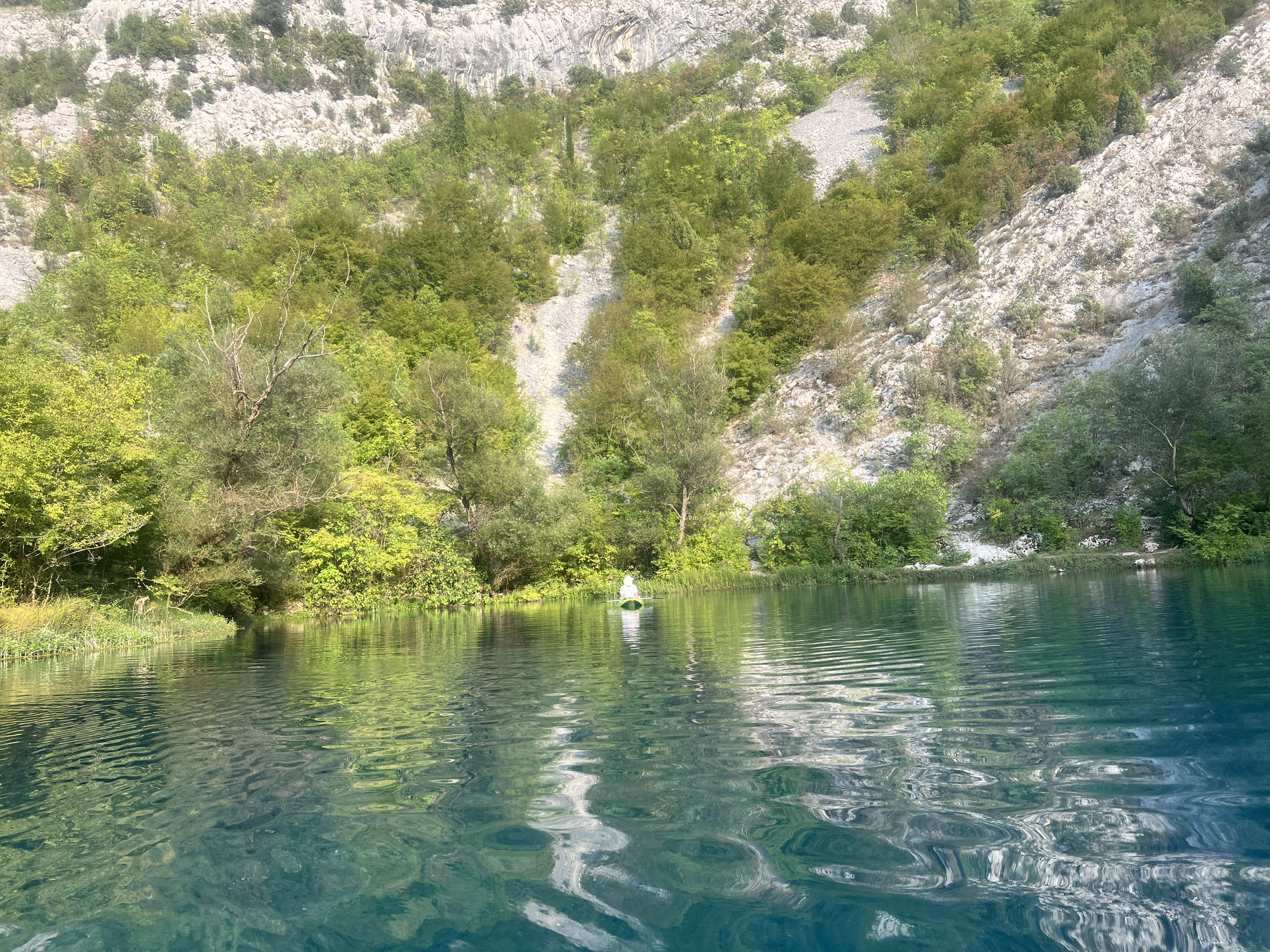
- Underground spring creating the Bunica river in Bosnia and Herzegovina (vrelo Bunice).

- Location of the Bunica in Bosnia and Herzegovina

Location
- Country: Bosnia and Herzegovina
- Canton: Herzegovina-Neretva

Physical characteristics
- Source: Vrelo Bunice karst spring
  - coordinates: 43.221611°N 17.889569°E
  - elevation: 55 m (180 ft)
- Mouth: Buna
  - coordinates: 43.2445°N 17.8516°E
- Length: 6 km (3.7 mi)

Basin features
- Progression: Buna→ Neretva→ Adriatic Sea

The Bunica (Serbian Cyrillic: Буница) is a short river in Bosnia and Herzegovina and a left-bank tributary of the Neretva. It is also a main tributary of the Buna. Its source, Vrelo Bunice, is located under sharp cliffs between the villages of Hodbina and Malo Polje, 14 km south from Mostar. It is a very deep and strong karstic spring and difficult to access. Together with the Buna river, it flows west for approximately 10 km and joins the Neretva river near the village of Buna. The Bunica is inhabited by endemic trout species known under its vernacular name as Softmouth trout.

== See also ==
- Blagaj, Mostar
- Krupa (Neretva)
- Hutovo Blato
- Vrelo Bune
