= Blagaj Fortress =

Castle in Bosnia and Herzegovina

Coordinates: 43°15′36″N 17°54′08″E

- Old Town Blagaj (Stjepan-grad, or Stipan-grad)
- Part of Historic site of Blagaj
- Blagaj, Mostar, Herzegovina-Neretva Canton; Bosnia and Herzegovina
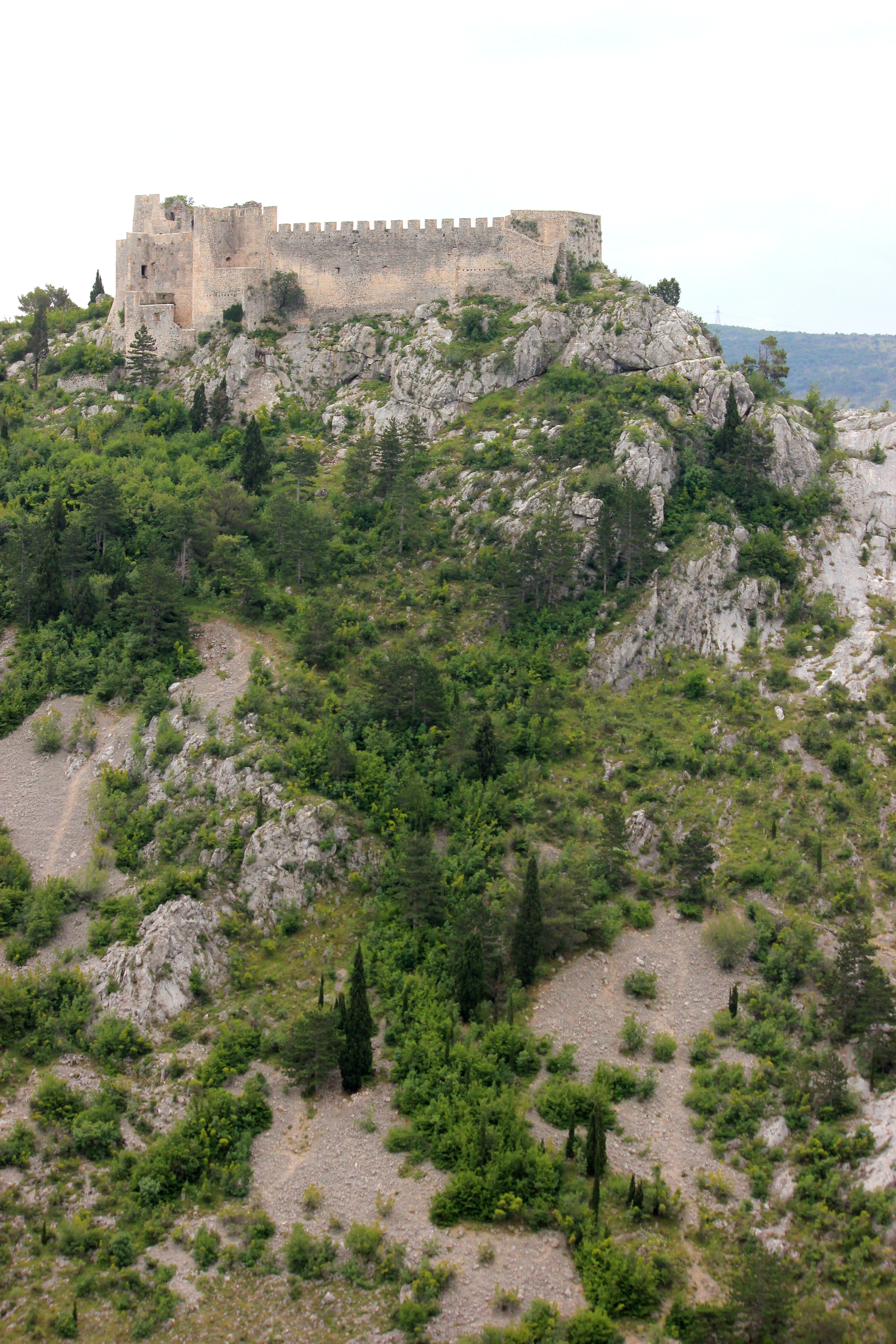
- Blagaj fortress, seat of Kosača family

Site information
- Type: Castle (residential, fortification)
- Owner: Kosača noble family
- Controlled by: Sandalj Hranić May 1404 to at least 1 November 1423; Stjepan Vukčić Kosača; Banate of Bosnia, Kingdom of Bosnia, Ottoman Empire
- Open to the public: yes
- Condition: Repaired

Location

Site history
- Built: 4th c. (then 948)
- Built by: multilayered (probably of local Illyrian)
- Materials: Limestone (partly ashlar)
- Battles/wars: Ottoman siege

Garrison information
- Designations

KONS of Bosnia and Herzegovina
- Official name: Old Fort of Blagaj (Stjepan grad), the historic site
- Type: Category I historical monument
- Criteria: A, B, C iv.vi., D ii., F ii.iii., G i.ii.v., H i.
- Designated: 6 December 2003
- Part of: Blagaj, the historic urban area
- Reference no.: 1863
- Decision no.: 06-6-1029/03-5
- Site is part of the Historic site of Blagaj on the Buna, also protected as National Monument of Bosnia and Herzegovina by the KONS BiH

Blagaj Fortress ground plan.

Blagaj Fortress or Old Town of Blagaj (Bosnian, Croatian and Serbian: Stari grad Blagaj, Serbian Cyrillic: Стари Град Благај; pronounced [blaːgaj]), locally known as Stjepan-grad (Стјепан-град), or Stipan-grad, in classical times Bona (Бона), is a town-fortress complex near the town of Blagaj, Bosnia and Herzegovina. The old Blagaj Fort was built on a high, inaccessible karst hill, at an elevation of 310 metres (1,020 ft) above sea level and 266 metres (873 ft) above the source of the river Buna. Blagaj Fort is 275 metres (902 ft) above sea level. Fortress is National monument of Bosnia and Herzegovina, declared by KONS on 6 December 2003.

== History ==
The archaeological material scattered above the slopes of Blagaj hill indicate that settlements existed here during the prehistoric and Roman periods. Remains of fortifications were discovered on each of the summit's highest points: On the north-eastern summit, there are the remains of a Roman or late antique fortification or observation post (specula, burgus) known as Mala gradina, while on the south-eastern summit the contours of a prehistoric hillfort can be discerned. The south-western summit contains the remains of the present day Stjepan grad, a medieval or Ottoman period fort. The shorter sides of the triangle are bordered by a gorge through which a river once flowed, and on the longer and only accessible side the remains of massive ramparts are visible, enclosing a fortified town complex of more than 2 hectares (4.9 acres) in area.

It is possible that this complex consisted of two parts in the early medieval period – the Old Fort (Stjepan grad) and Mala gradina, and that this twin settlement lasted at least until the mid-tenth century. The earliest indirect source in writing on the Zahumlje forts, including Blagaj, is the "Treatise on Peoples" by the Byzantine Emperor and writer Constantine Porphyrogenitus, dating between 948 and 952, in which two forts are referred to – Bona and Hum.

After the 10th century, Blagaj played an important role in the development of Hum or Zahumlje. A major influence on its development was the proximity of a major route linking the Adriatic Sea with the Bosnian hinterland via the Neretva valley (“via Narenti”). Turbulent political events, particularly after the tenth century, did not have any essential impact on the economic development of the town besides the occasional ramparts. The prince of Hum, Miroslav, held court in Blagaj (Orbini, II Regno, 350) where he constructed a church dedicated to Saints Cosmas and Damian. A plaque with an inscription in Cyrillic, found in 1912 near the ruins of the local manor in Bišće and the locality Vrači records the construction of the church (Vego, 1957, 15). The plaque is now kept in the National Museum of Bosnia and Herzegovina.

By the time of King Tvrtko, Bosnian rulers were issuing charters in Blagaj, and in May 1404 Blagaj became one of the residences of Duke (vojvoda) Sandalj Hranić, and then of count (herzeg) Stjepan Vukčić Kosača, after whom the people named the fort Stjepan grad. The first written reference to it is a peace accord between Duke Sandalj Hranić and the Venetians, from November 1, 1423, issued “in our town of Blagaj”. It was also mentioned in the 15th century charters of the King of Aragon and Naples, Alphonse V.

The Ottomans occupied Blagaj in 1465, and by 1473 references to the kadija of Blagaj already exist. The Ottomans repaired the fort twice: in 1699, when the west tower was repaired, and again in 1827. A garrison was stationed there until 1835, although the fort's former strategic role had long since been taken over by Mostar.

== Description of fortress complex ==
=== Location ===
The old Blagaj Fort was built on a high, inaccessible karst hill, at an elevation of 310 metres (1,020 ft) above sea level and 266 metres (873 ft) above the source of the river Buna. Blagaj Fort is 275 metres (902 ft) above sea level.

=== Architecture ===
Unlike other fortifications that were also rulers’ residences in Bosnia and Herzegovina, the Blagaj fort is on a naturally flat site above vertical cliffs to the south, west and north. The ground plan of the fort is an irregular polygon adapted to the configuration of the terrain. The approach route, a steep serpentine bridle path 2 metres (7 ft) wide and 900 metres (3,000 ft) long, leads to the entrance in the thickest (east) wall of the forecourt. The walls of 12 or 14 metres (39 or 46 ft) in height have remained largely preserved, and range in thickness from 1.5 to 2.0 metres (4.9 to 6.6 ft), while on the south they are no thicker than 1.5 metres (4.9 ft). The inner defended space is a relatively small area of about 1,700 square metres (18,000 ft^{2}), similar to the Jajce fort.

The entrance to the fortified town was protected by an outer forecourt that is now hard to discern, a forecourt (VII, measuring 10 × 11.5 m) and a gatehouse (VII, measuring 10 × 7 m) as the final obstacle to attackers. The walls of the gatehouse are noticeably more solid and higher than those of the forecourt.

In the 6th century, most of the walls were increased in height although their dimensions remained the same. During the medieval period the entire mass was considerably increased by these additions, and it is not impossible that some of the lower parts of the tower collapsed. The breastworks may not have been built up fully to their original height, but somewhat lower (Basler, 1983, 32). In the late 14th and early 15th century, the walls were reinforced and thickened. About ten meters from the fort yet another wall was added giving that space the impression of a trench. The east wall was badly damaged in the 18th or early 19th century when a large quantity of gunpowder exploded in its middle tower. Repairs were carried out rather clumsily and considerably altered the original appearance (Basler, 1983). Anđelić, who carried out excavations in 1965, writes: “As a detailed result of the excavations, it turned out that the fort had no remains of antique or late antique architecture” (Anđelić, 1965, 179).

Among the architectural features discovered, the most significant were the remains of a palace (XV), of irregular rectangular outline.

A comparison of the walls' structure enables one to track the various stages of construction and repair - from the earliest beginnings of the fort in the fourth century. The walls of the first stage of construction are of quarry stone laid in horizontal layers (opus incertum), similar to the palace in Mogorjelo. In the second stage, which lasted between 535 and 600, the walls were repaired and in places built up to a height of 1 to 3 metres (3.3 to 9.8 ft), using the technique of stone laid slantwise (opus spicatum). This construction technique is associated with the reign of the Emperor Justinian (527–565). Repairs to the central tower of the east wall date to the 6th century. The type and extent of the interventions dating from the 7th to the 15th century are hard to determine because of later repairs, conducted in opus incertum up to the 19th century. After the 16th century, all works on the fort were carried out by local 'dunđeri' (all-round builders who would turn their hand equally to masonry or carpentry), which is ascribed to the abrupt decline in the strategic importance of the fort in the circumstances of the day.

== Archaeological research ==
In 1965, systematic archaeological excavations were undertaken with the supervision of the National Museum of Bosnia and Herzegovina. An area of about 1,000 square metres (11,000 ft^{2}) was investigated, that is, more than one-third of the area enclosed with ramparts. The archaeological layers were generally characterized with considerable thickness (0.50 to 3.50 m) and by the sparsity of art materials. However, in the medieval stratum pottery and small iron items were discovered, along with pieces of glass and charred grain. A large quantity of lead—about 700 kilograms (1,500 lb)—was unearthed in the ruins of the palace. In the archaeological stratum dating from the Ottoman period, the only finds consisted pottery shards and small items of ironmongery used in construction. As a result of the excavations, it was concluded that Blagaj had no remains of antique and early mediaeval architecture because there was no any archaeological material from that period. However, a few shards of Illyrian pottery and a few small fragments of Roman roof tiles indicate the presence of Illyrians on this prominent site (Anđelić, 1965, 178–180).

The shahids' necropolis in Blagaj located below the fort, near the road, is an old Muslim burial ground known as Šehitluk. Graves and tombstones are almost completely wrecked, although the outlines of several graves can still be discerned and there are eight, mostly damaged nišan tombstones to the left and right of the brook and road. This is most likely the oldest burial ground in Blagaj.

== National Monument ==
The historic site of the Old Fortress in Blagaj (also known as Stjepan grad) is placed under the state protection and declared National Monument of Bosnia and Herzegovina by KONS on 6 December 2003.

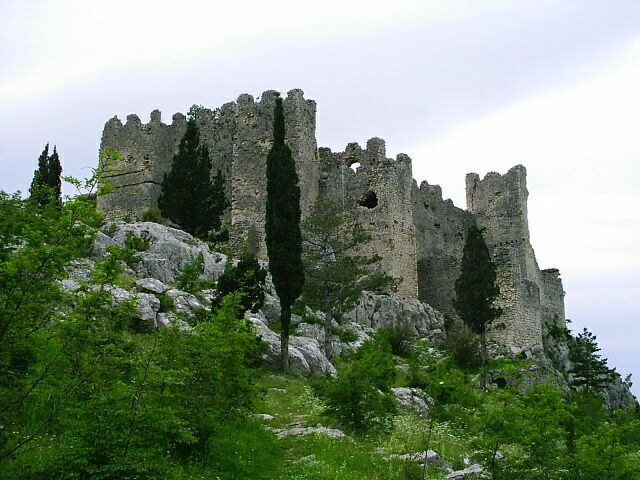

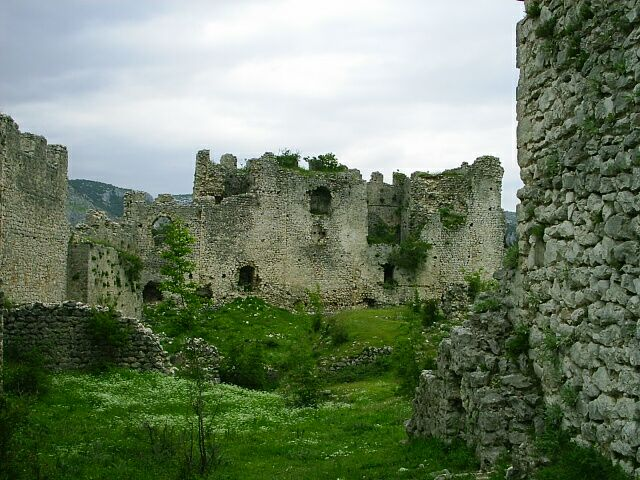

== See also ==
- Ključ Fortress
- Walled town of Počitelj
