= Buna Canals =

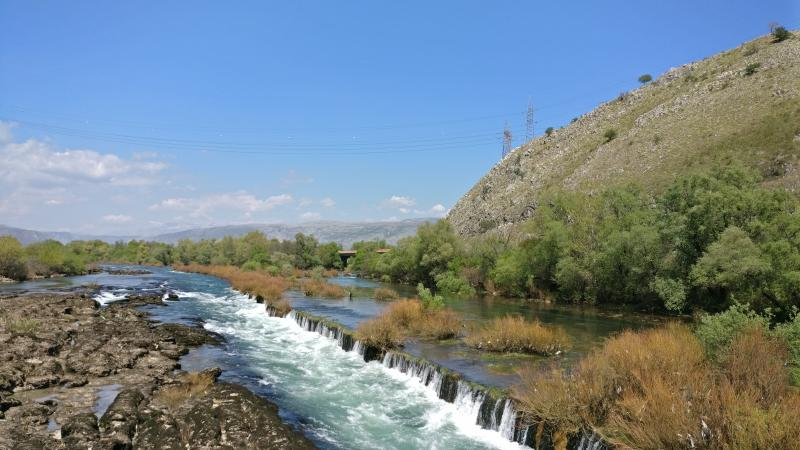
- Main canal in the Neretva bed

- Location within Bosnia and Herzegovina
- Interactive map of Buna Canals
- Location: Buna
- Country: Bosnia and Herzegovina
- Coordinates: 43.240238815825364°N 17.833450037433266°E

Specifications
- Length: 0.85 km (0.53 miles) (originally 0.85 km or 0.53 mi)

Geography
- Direction: North-South
- Beginning coordinates: 43.246135199854365°N 17.830883606809476°E
- Ending coordinates: 43.23669972774669°N 17.833453162936582°E

The Buna Canals are a geomorphological phenomenon on the Neretva River in Bosnia and Herzegovina.

== Geography and hydrology ==
The Canals are situated at the site of the confluence of its left tributary, the Buna. The location of the site is south of Mostar along the main road M-17 Mostar - Čapljina.

The main canal through which the Neretva flows for about 850 meters is about 3 meters narrow and as much deep, while its left tributary, the Buna, flows into it over a travertine barrier, creating a long line of waterfalls, depending on seasonal water levels of at most 2 meters in hight. Downstream of the Buna Canals, the Neretva calms down its flow, and the bed widens again. Soon, just below Čapljina, the Neretva approaches Croatian border after which it takes a form of a typically lowland river from Metković to the Adriatic Sea.

== Dam controversy ==
Recently, a construction of a series of small hydroelectrical power plants using the potential energy of the Buna Canals and its natural fall as the head to feed a generator was proposed. However, local inhabitants organized a public resistance to the project, seeking formal protection of the site.
