= Karađoz-beg bridge =

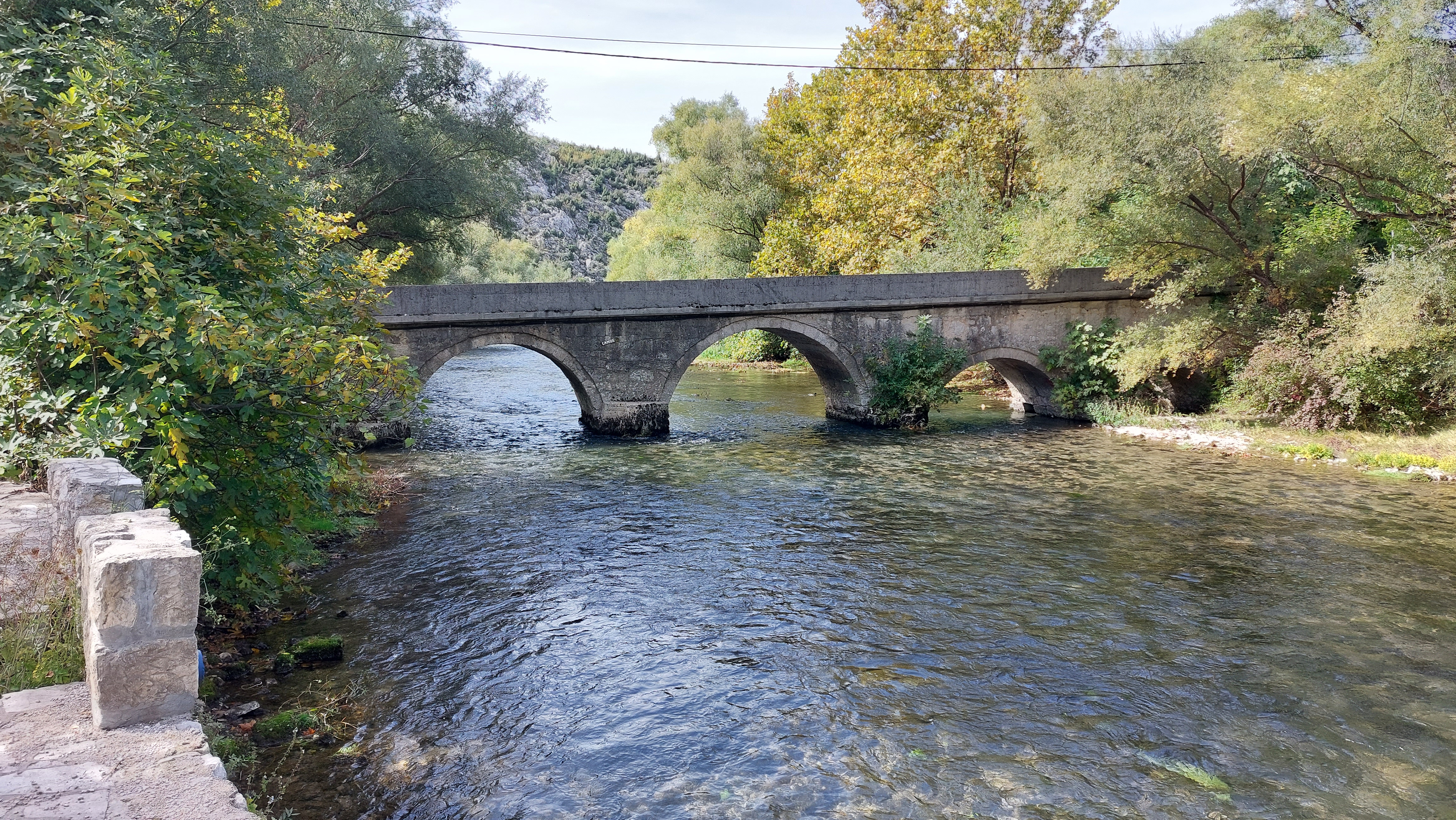
- Karađoz-beg bridge
- Coordinates: 43°15′21″N 17°53′43″E
- Crosses: Buna
- Locale: Blagaj, Mostar, Bosnia and Herzegovina

The Karađoz-begov bridge is a stone arch bridge with five arches on the Buna river in Blagaj, Mostar, Bosnia and Herzegovina. The bridge is declared a National monument of Bosnia and Herzegovina by KONS, and as part of the Blagaj Heritage Site it is placed on a UNESCO Tentative List.

== Location ==
The bridge spans the Buna River in a northwest-southeast direction, in the town of Blagaj. It is located about 700 metres (2,300 ft) downstream from the source of the Buna, over which the old road to Stolac is maintained. Access to the bridge is from the southeast branch of the Mostar–Blagaj road towards the Buna River.

== History ==
The bridge was built on the site of an earlier medieval river crossing as an endowment of Hajji Mehmed-beg Karađoz. It is first mentioned in the Mostar benefactor's waqfnama (written declaration of waqf; endowment deed) from 1570, so it must have been built somewhat earlier.

In 1849, according to the translation of the tarih, the bridge was significantly damaged or destroyed and a certain Belfe-Kadira, daughter of Ali-beg Velagić, gave money for its repair. The tarih (inscription plaque) about this repair, according to the record of the archaeologist Radimski from 1891, was built into the bridge. Today, the tablet, measuring 65 x 60 cm, is located in the courtyard of the Sultan Sulejman mosque in Blagaj. It is assumed that it was saved when the bridge was demolished during World War II.

== Description ==
Almost without exception, the old bridges in Bosnia and Herzegovina were built of stone. The structural system was fundamentally based on the basic elements: the vault and the arch. When building stone bridges, wrought iron and lead were also used to connect individual blocks, especially the vaults, parts of the cornice, railings, etc.

The total length of the bridge, including the openings and central pillars, is 33.4 metres (110 ft).

The shape of the Karađoz-beg Bridge is reminiscent of the majority of stone bridges with multiple arches that were constructed during that era. The span of the arches and the arrow increase in size as the bridge approaches the center, resulting in a distinctive ascending line that abruptly breaks in the middle. This basic shape of the bridge was disturbed by the later raising of the road level, and in connection with this, the original level of the bridge, so triangular overhangs were created on the facade along the right bank.

The bridge consists of five stone barrel vaults, which are built of regular stone blocks in horizontal layers. The vaults rest on four stone masonry pillars in the riverbed and on two piers on the banks of the Buna. The pillars of the Karađoz-beg Bridge are made of finely finished stone blocks and are not standard. Judging by the method of construction, the bridge was built by local craftsmen. The arches, the end arches, are semicircular and are set back about 3 cm from the plane of the end walls. Since the bridge as a whole is conceived as a completely low structure, the arches do not grow from the bridge pillars, but together with the pillars from the foundation. The thickness of the arches is 40 cm.

The bridge is declared a National monument of Bosnia and Herzegovina by KONS.
