= Arslanagić =

Arslanagić is a surname of South Slavic origin. Notable people with the surname include:

- Abas Arslanagić (born 1944), Bosnian handball player and coach
- Dino Arslanagić (born 1993), Belgian footballer
- Maida Arslanagić (born 1984), Bosnian-Croatian handball player
- Zijad Arslanagić (1936–2020), Bosnian footballer

== See also ==
- Arslanagić Bridge, a bridge in Trebinje, Bosnia and Herzegovina
