= Buna, Mostar =

Buna
- Village
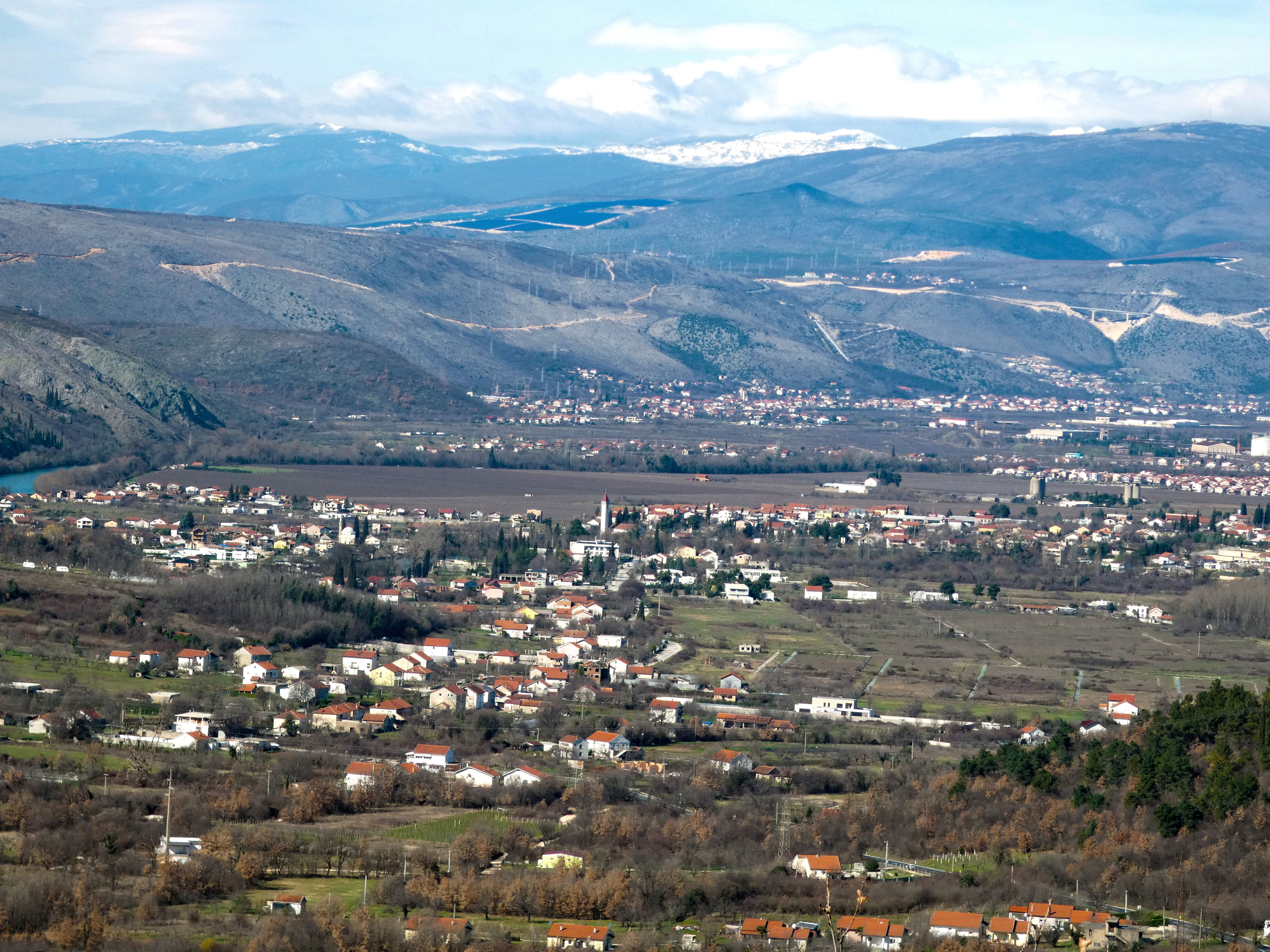
- Hodbina (in the foreground), Buna (around the church)

- Location within Bosnia and Herzegovina
- Country: Bosnia and Herzegovina
- Entity: Federation of Bosnia and Herzegovina
- Canton: Herzegovina-Neretva
- Municipality: Mostar

Area
  - Total: 4.80 sq mi (12.43 km^{2})

Population (2013)
  - Total: 1,291
  - Density: 269.0/sq mi (103.9/km^{2})
- Time zone: UTC+1 (CET)
  - Summer (DST): UTC+2 (CEST)

Buna (Serbian Cyrillic: Буна) is a populated settlement at the confluence of the Buna river and Neretva river some 10 km downstream the Neretva and south of Mostar, Herzegovina-Neretva Canton, Bosnia and Herzegovina.

The famous source of the Buna river (Vrelo Bune) is a strong karstic spring. The Buna river flows west from its source for approximately 9 kilometres and joins the Neretva near this village that has taken its name from the river.

== Demographics ==
According to the 2013 census, its population was 1,291.

Ethnicity in 2013
Ethnicity	Number	Percentage
Croats	1,120	86.6%
Bosniaks	149	11.5%
Serbs	2	0.2%
other/undeclared	20	1.5%
Total	1,291	100%

== See also ==
- Blagaj, Mostar
- Vrelo Bunice
- Bregava
- Stolac
- Trebižat
- Hutovo Blato
