= Podgorani, Bosnia and Herzegovina =

Podgorani
- Village
- Location within Bosnia and Herzegovina
- Coordinates: 43.4914527°N 17.8771588°E
- Country: Bosnia and Herzegovina
- Entity: Federation of Bosnia and Herzegovina
- Canton: Herzegovina-Neretva
- Municipality: City of Mostar

Area
  - Total: 16.59 sq mi (42.97 km^{2})

Population (2013)
  - Total: 614
  - Density: 37.0/sq mi (14.3/km^{2})
- Time zone: UTC+1 (CET)
  - Summer (DST): UTC+2 (CEST)

Podgorani is a village in the city of Mostar, Bosnia and Herzegovina.

== Demographics ==
According to the 2013 census, its population was 614, all Bosniaks.
