= Kosor (surname) =

Kosor is a surname. Notable persons with that surname include:

- Darinko Kosor (born 1965), Croatian politician
- Jadranka Kosor (born 1953), Croatian politician and prime minister
- Josip Kosor (1879–1961), Croatian novelist and playwright
