= Arslanagić Bridge =

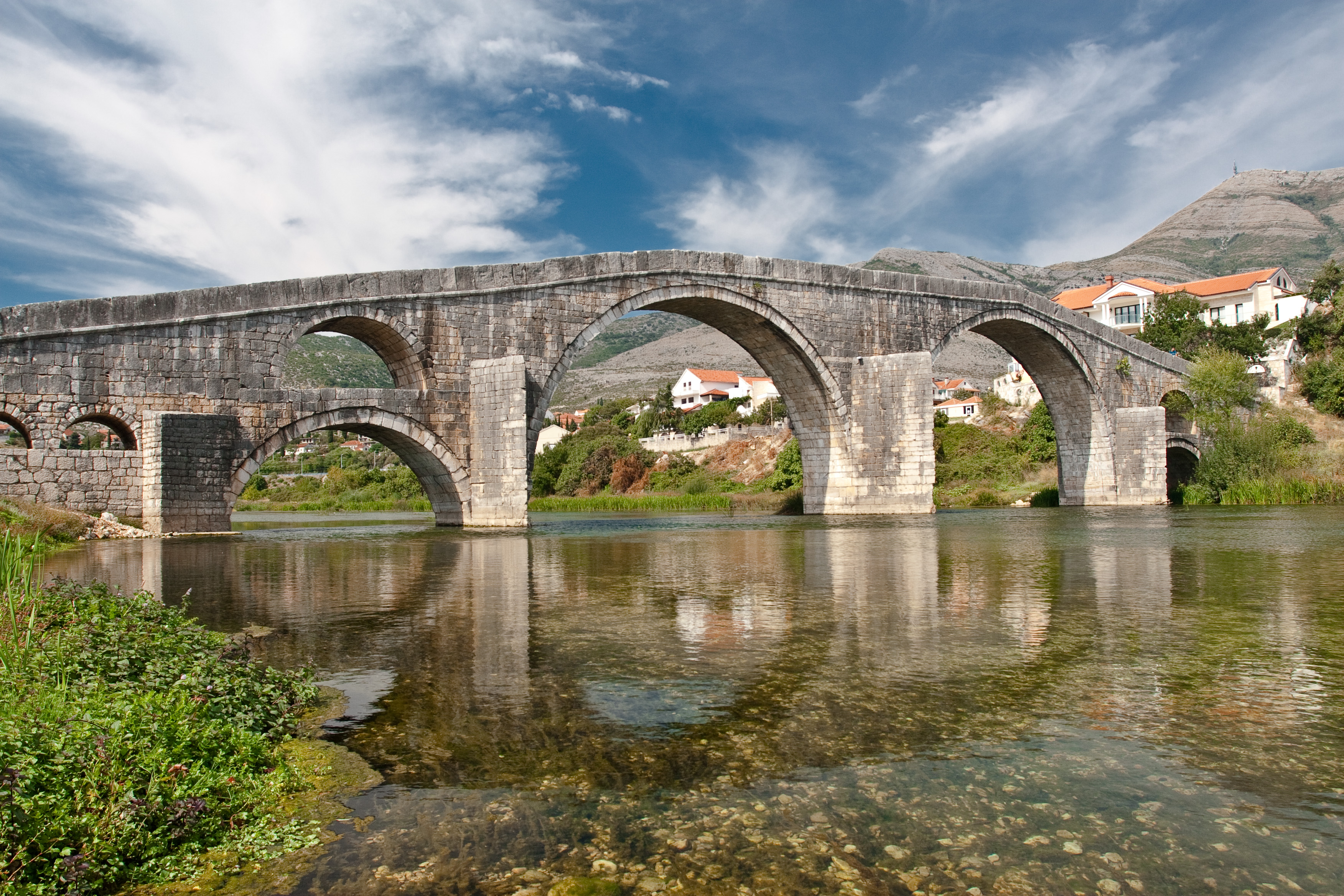
- Arslanagić Bridge near Trebinje, Bosnia and Herzegovina
- Coordinates: 42°42′53″N 18°21′14″E
- Carries: Pedestrians
- Crosses: Trebišnjica
- Locale: Trebinje, Bosnia and Herzegovina
- Official name: Arslanagića ćuprija
- Other name: Hajdar-begova Ćuprija
- Named for: Suriman Arslanagić
- Heritage status: National Monument of BiH

Characteristics
- Design: Multiple-arch
- Material: Tufa / travertine
- Trough construction: mortar
- Pier construction: limestone
- No. of spans: 6 + 2
- Piers in water: 4

History
- Constructed by: Hajdar-Bey
- Construction end: between 1650 and 1690
- Rebuilt: 1966

Location
- Interactive map of Arslanagić Bridge

Arslanagić Bridge (Serbo-Croatian: Arslanagića ćuprija, Serbian Cyrillic: Арсланагића ћуприја; Turkish: Arslanağa Köprüsü), is a bridge in the municipality of Trebinje, Bosnia and Herzegovina. Since 25 January 2006, this bridge on the Trebišnjica has been declared a National Monument of Bosnia and Herzegovina.

During the Bosnian War, the bridge was renamed Perović Bridge (Serbo-Croatian: Perovića most). An explanation for this was to divert attention from its name the Bosniak Muslim family surname Arslanagić, which could provoke Serb nationalists to demolish it.

== Gallery ==
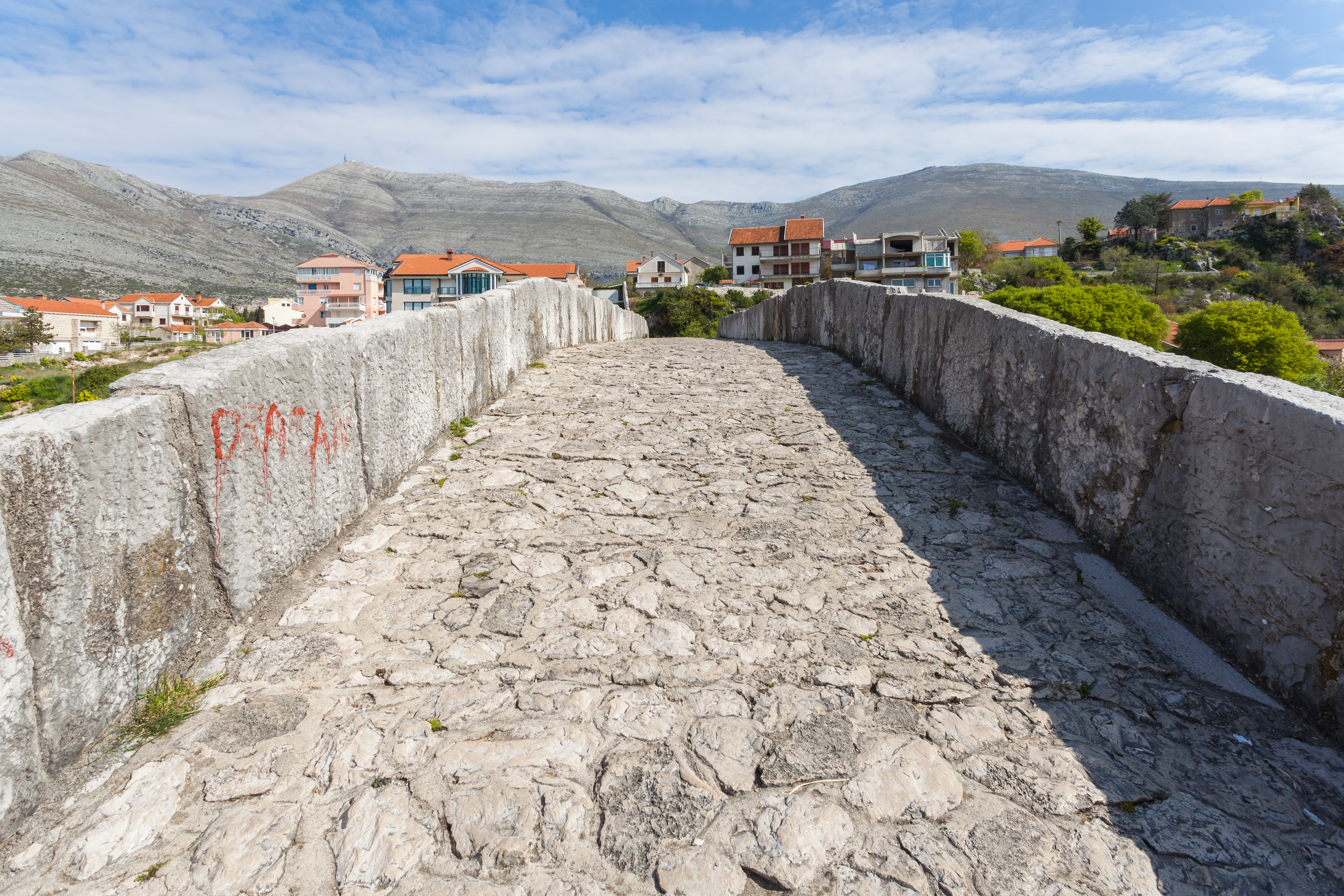
Surface

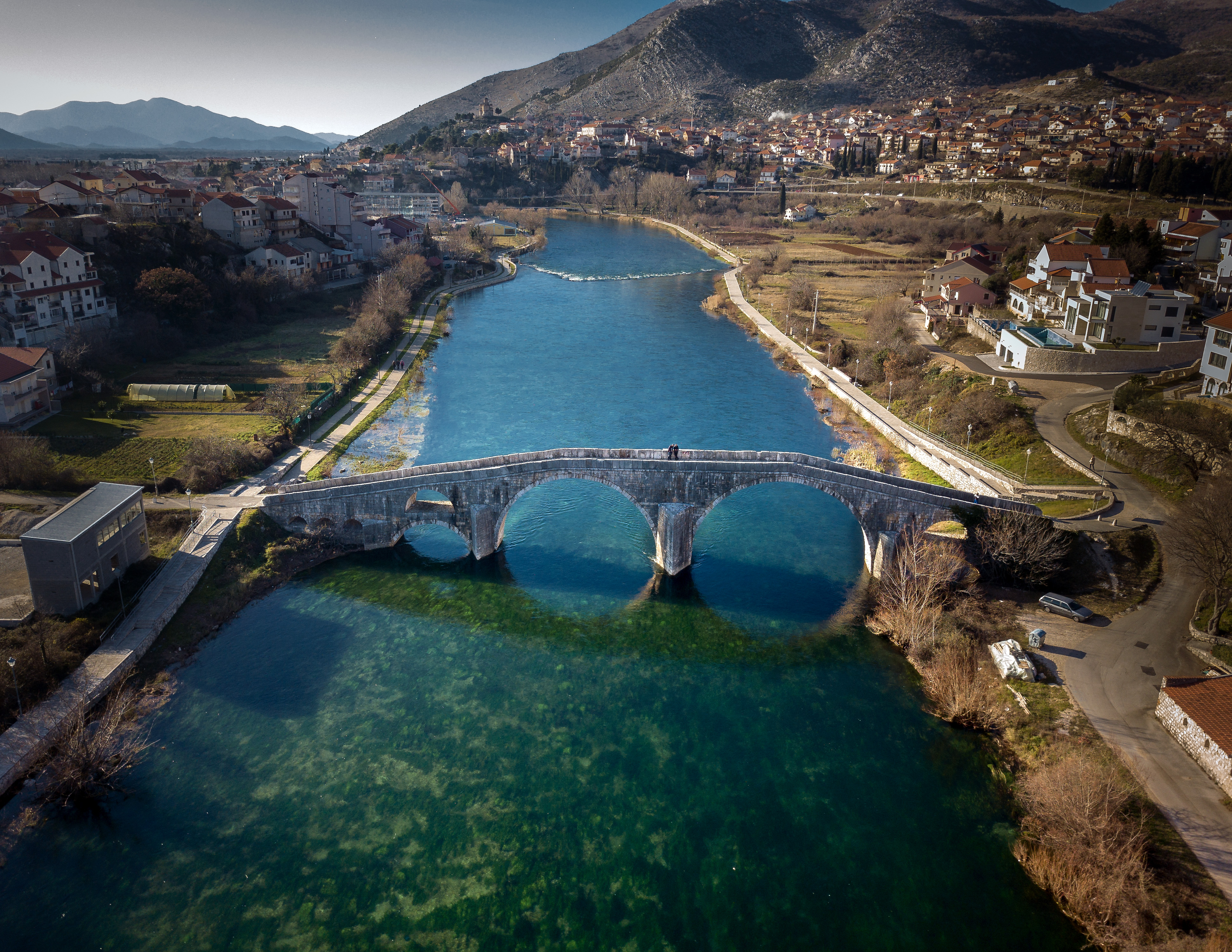
Panoramic view

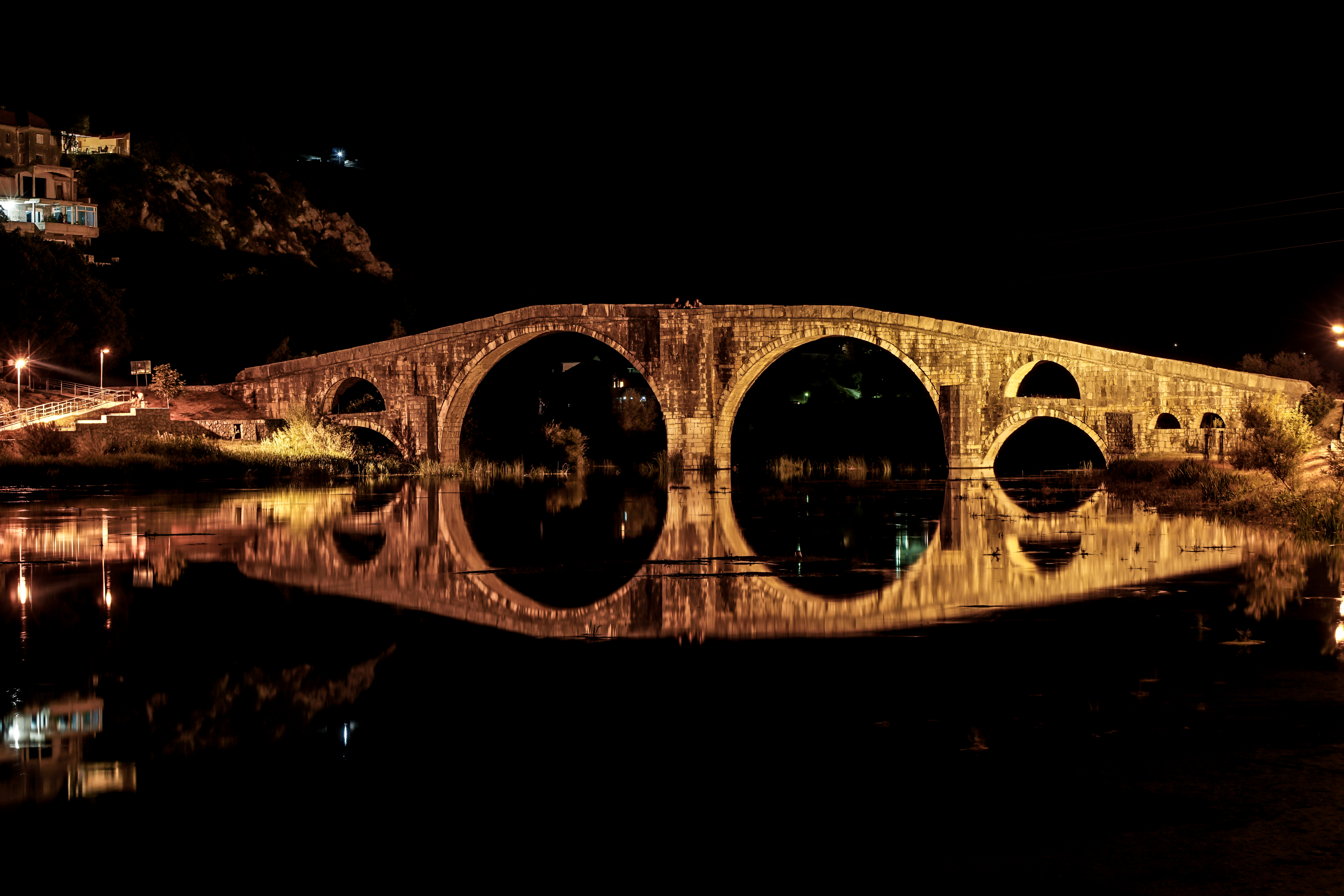
Night view

== See also ==
- List of bridges in Bosnia and Herzegovina
- List of National Monuments of Bosnia and Herzegovina
