= Stara Ćuprija =

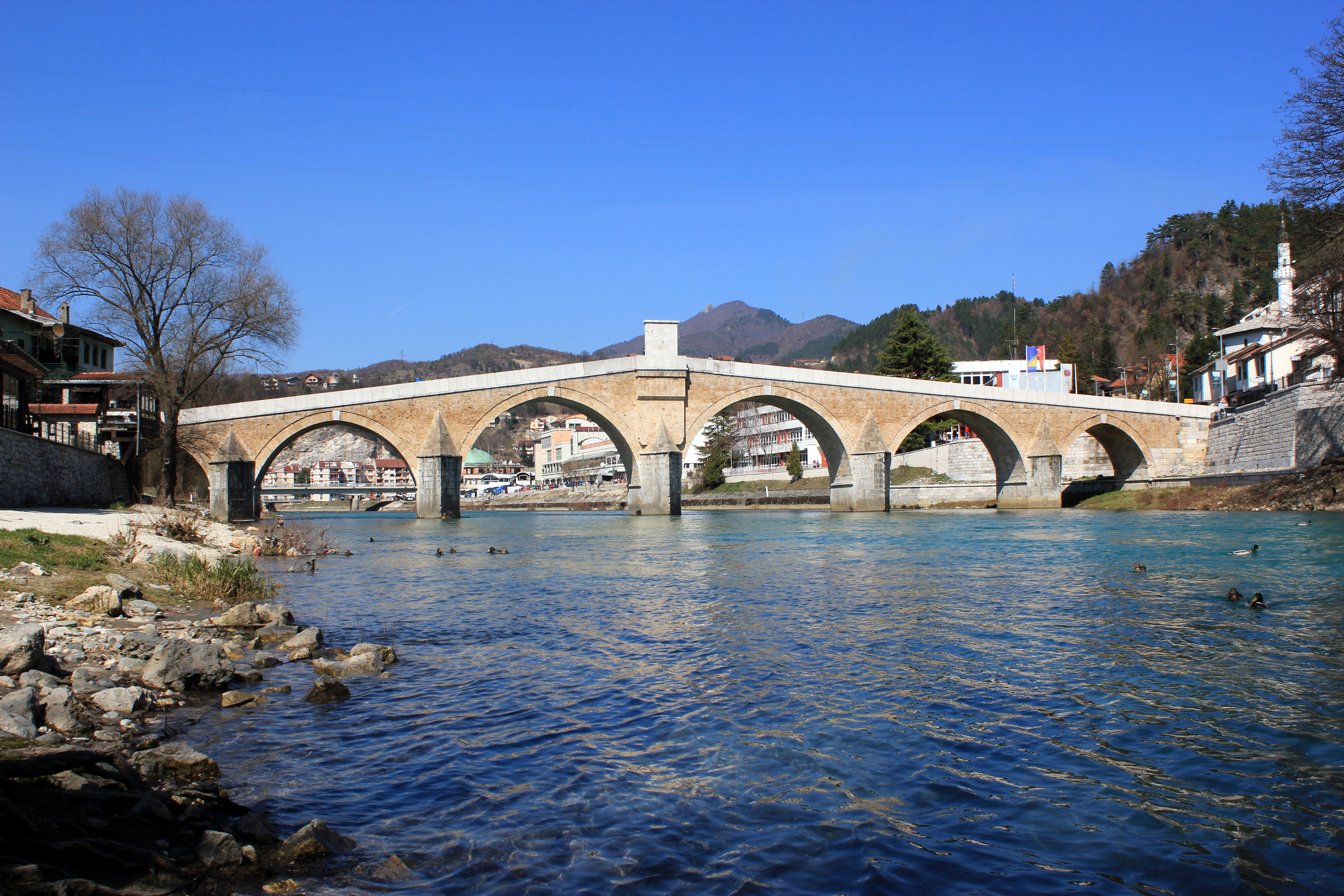
- Coordinates: 43°39′04″N 17°57′46″E
- Carried: Pedestrians
- Crossed: Neretva
- Locale: Konjic, Bosnia and Herzegovina
- Other name(s): Old stone bridge in Konjic
- Heritage status: National Monument of BiH

Characteristics
- Design: Multiple-Arch
- Material: Tufa
- Trough construction: Mortar
- Pier construction: Limestone
- Total length: metres
- Width: 4 metres
- No. of spans: 6
- Piers in water: 5
- Clearance below: metres at mid-span

History
- Constructed by: Ali-aga Hasečić
- Construction start: 1682
- Construction end: 1683
- Opened: 1683
- Rebuilt: 2009
- Collapsed: March 1945

Stara Ćuprija (Bosnian: The Old Bridge) is a bridge spanning the Neretva River in the town of Konjic, Bosnia and Herzegovina. It is a significant example of Ottoman bridge architecture in the Balkans, and is a listed National Monument of Bosnia and Herzegovina.

== History ==
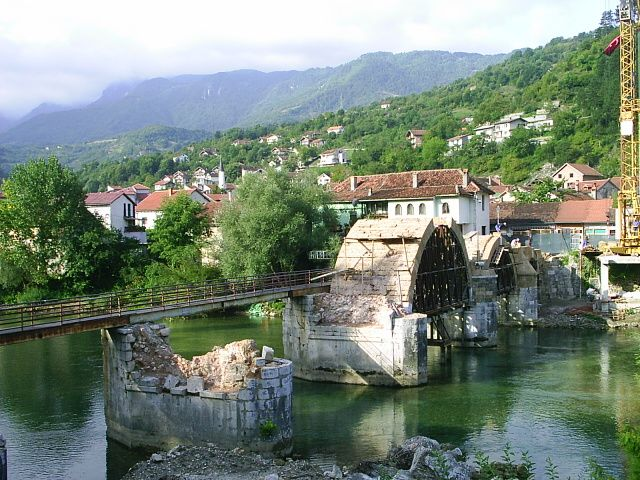
Bridge foundations during reconstruction in 2006

The bridge was built between 1682 and 1683 by Ali-aga Hasečić (as commemorated by a stone plaque at the center span) atop six slightly-pointed stone arches. In March 1945, the bridge's deck was destroyed by explosive charges laid by the retreating German army. While the arches suffered heavy damage, all five piers survived, preserving the bridge's basic structural integrity and permitting eventual reconstruction.

After World War II, the Yugoslav government decided to temporarily repair the bridge for basic use, with a makeshift deck made of iron beams laid across the still-intact masonry piers supporting a one-lane tarmac for motorized vehicle traffic. This temporarily solution lasted for more than five decades, until after the Yugoslav Wars. The bridge was restored to its original appearance with European financial assistance between 2003 and 2009, and is once again a landmark of Ottoman architecture in Bosnia and Herzegovina.

The bridge was reopened on 16 June 2009.

== See also ==
- List of bridges in Bosnia and Herzegovina
- Konjic
