= Brodac Donji =

Brodac Donji Бродац Доњи (Serbian)
- Village (Selo)
- Location within Bosnia and Herzegovina
- Coordinates: 44°51′46.08″N 19°16′53.01″E
- Country: Bosnia and Herzegovina
- Entity: Republika Srpska
- City: Bijeljina

Population (2013)
  - Total: 729
- Time zone: UTC+1 (CET)
  - Summer (DST): UTC+2 (CEST)
- Postal code: 76300

Brodac Donji (Serbian Cyrillic: Бродац Доњи) is a small village located north of the city of Bijeljina in Republika Srpska, Bosnia and Herzegovina.
