= Prigrađani =

- Village
- Location within Bosnia and Herzegovina
- Coordinates: 43.4626319°N 17.8236006°E
- Country: Bosnia and Herzegovina
- Entity: Federation of Bosnia and Herzegovina
- Canton: Herzegovina-Neretva
- Municipality: City of Mostar

Area
  - Total: 6.47 sq mi (16.75 km^{2})

Population (2013)
  - Total: 759
  - Density: 117/sq mi (45.3/km^{2})
- Time zone: UTC+1 (CET)
  - Summer (DST): UTC+2 (CEST)

Prigrađani is a village in the City of Mostar, Bosnia and Herzegovina.

== Demographics ==
According to the 2013 census, its population was 759.

Ethnicity in 2013
| Ethnicity | Number | Percentage |
|---|---|---|
| Bosniaks | 643 | 84.7% |
| Serbs | 63 | 8.3% |
| Croats | 4 | 0.5% |
| other/undeclared | 49 | 6.5% |
| Total | 759 | 100% |
