= Mustaj-bey Bridge =

Bridge in Čapljina, Bosnia and Herzegovina

Mustafa bey Bridge Mustaj-begova ćuprija
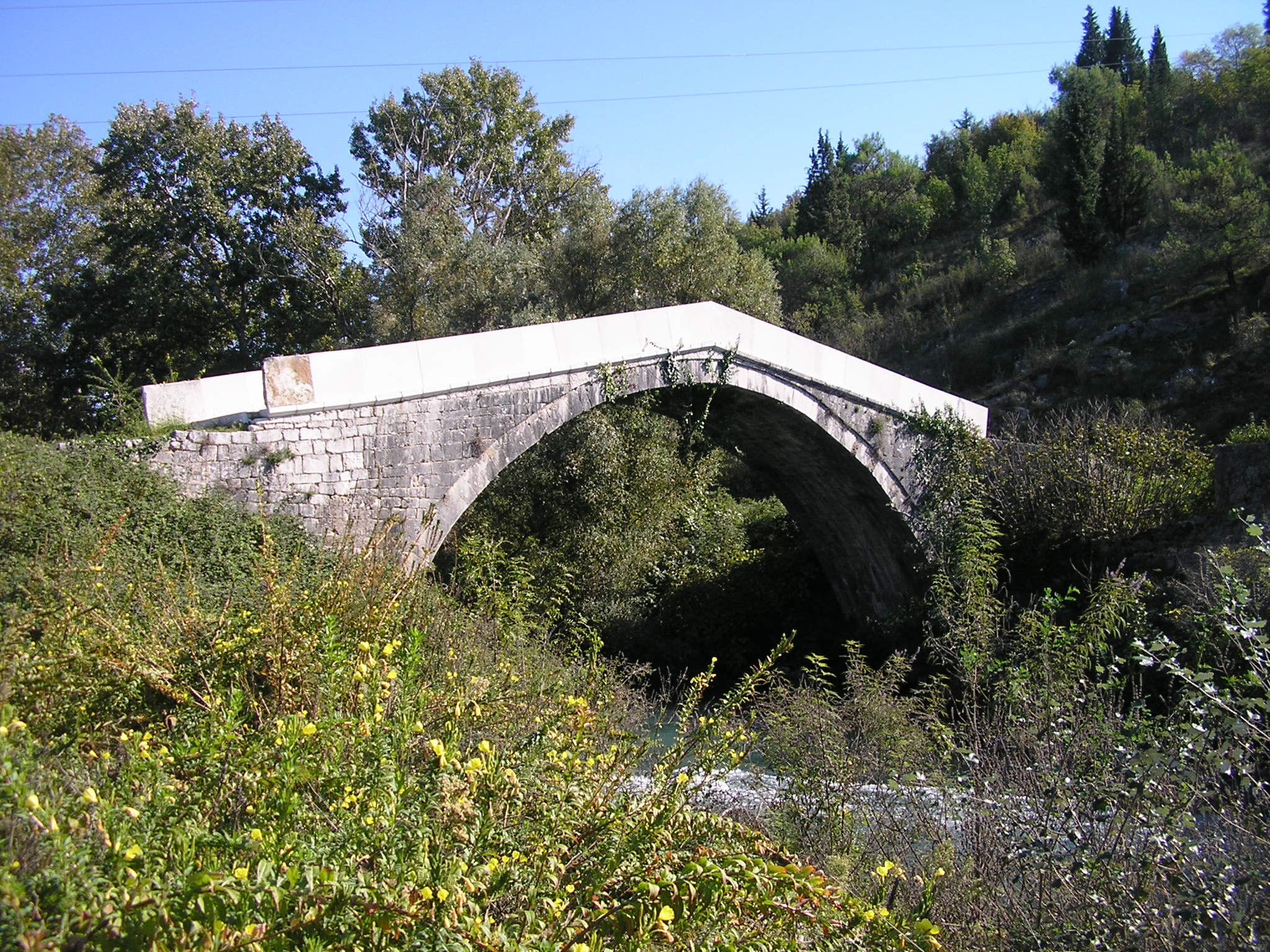
- Bridge over Bregava in Klepci
- Coordinates: 43°05′58″N 17°43′18″E
- Crosses: Bregava
- Locale: Klepci; Bosnia and Herzegovina
- Official name: Most u Klepcima
- Named for: Mustafa bey of Herzegovina
- Owner: state
- Maintained by: Institute for the Protection of Monuments of the Federation of Bosnia and Herzegovina; KONS
- Heritage status

KONS of Bosnia and Herzegovina
- Official name: Bridge in Klepci, the historic building
- Type: Category I cultural heritage
- Criteria: B, C, D, E, F, G, H i., I.
- Designated: 21 January 2003 (?th session; 08.2-6-725/03)
- Reference no.: 185
- State: National Monuments of Bosnia and Herzegovina

Characteristics
- Material: Limestone
- Traversable?: yes
- No. of spans: 1

History
- Constructed by: Mustafa bey of Herzegovina
- Built: 1517
- Rebuilt: cca 150 yrs. later

Statistics
- Daily traffic: pedestrian

Mustaj-bey Bridge or Mustafa bey Bridge (Serbo-Croatian: Mustaj-begova ćuprija; Mustajbegova ćuprija, lit. 'Mustaj-begov most'), also called the Bridge in Klepci (Serbo-Croatian: Most u Klepcima), is located in the settlement of Klepci near Čapljina in Bosnia and Herzegovina. It bridges the Bregava River which flows into the Neretva River just a half a kilometer further down the stream. It is declared a National Monument of Bosnia and Herzegovina at the KONS session held from January 21 to 27, 2003.

== History ==
The bridge was built in 1517 by the sandžak-beg of Herzegovina, Mustafa-bey (Serbo-Croatian: Mustaj-beg), and some 150 years later the bridge was rebuilt by the order of Šišman Ibrahim Pasha of Počitelj. The bridge was built according to a similar model about 50 years before the Stari Most (transl. Old Bridge) in Mostar. Considering that roads from an earlier period were discovered at this place, it is possible that a Roman bridge existed on the site of today's bridge.

== Description and architecture ==
The bridge is representative of Ottoman architecture of Bosnia and Herzegovina. The span of the arched opening of the bridge is 17.52 m (the arch arrow above the lowest water level is 6.30 m and extends about 1 m below the water surface), and the arched structure is made segmentally. The under-view of the arch vault is made of hewn stone, with radial joints. The front arches of the vault are recessed about 4 cm in relation to the front walls, so the width of the vault is about 6.4 m. The cornice above the front walls is 17 cm high and has a simple profile, with a fence-corkaluk height of 88 cm. The projection of the wreath is 10 cm in relation to the fence - korkaluk. The thickness of the eaves is about 15 cm, and the walking structure is 3.75 m wide, with a steep grade. The highest point is 7.20 m above the minimum water level, 6.44 m on the right and 5.71 m on the left bank of the Bregava river. It is made of cobblestones made of larger river pebbles with uneven steps (in the plane of the cornice on the front walls).

== Preservation and heritage ==
Due to long-term inattention and negligence, parts of the fence were destroyed - korkaluk, cornices over the front walls and cobblestones, especially between 1957 and 1987 when parts of the wing walls were also destroyed. In 1952, Institute for the Protection of Monuments carried out conservation and restoration work, when the cobblestones and walls were reconstructed, but using inappropriate building materials. Subsequent works on the project to regulate the Bregava devastated the natural environment of the bridge, and the reconstruction of the local road in 1991 partially endangered the approach ramp, but the Institute for the Protection of Monuments prevented major consequences. Although undamaged in the Bosnian war, due to further lack of maintenance and traffic of heavy machinery, the bridge was in a rather poor condition.

=== Recent interventions ===
In the spring of 2019, conservation and restoration measures were carried out to repair the bridge, which created the prerequisites for its complete repair and reconstruction.
