= Hodbina =

- Village
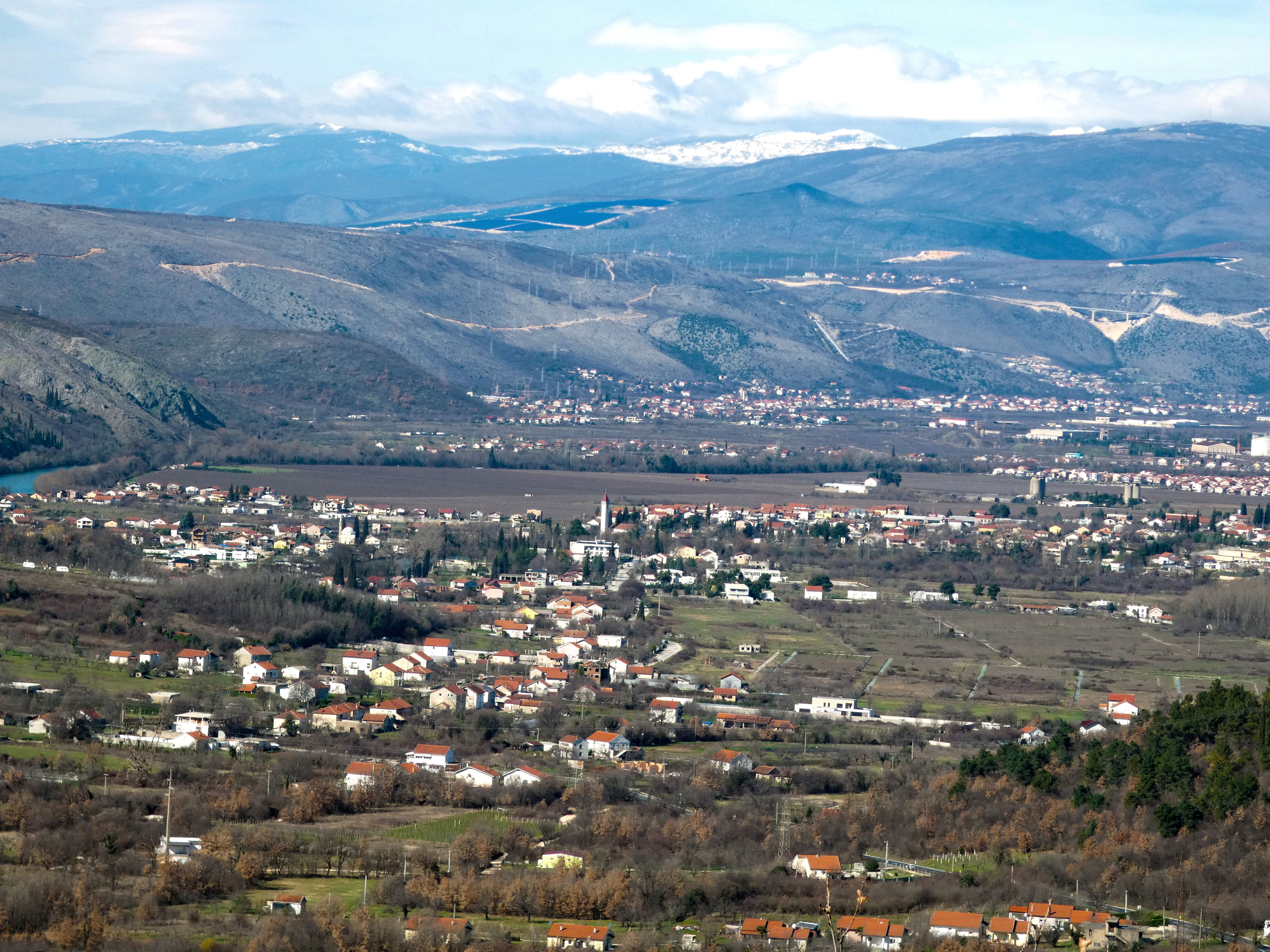
- Hodbina (in the foreground), Buna (around the church)

- Location within Bosnia and Herzegovina
- Coordinates: 43.223155°N 17.8435133°E
- Country: Bosnia and Herzegovina
- Entity: Federation of Bosnia and Herzegovina
- Canton: Herzegovina-Neretva
- Municipality: City of Mostar

Area
  - Total: 4.91 sq mi (12.72 km^{2})

Population (2013)
  - Total: 813
  - Density: 166/sq mi (63.9/km^{2})
- Time zone: UTC+1 (CET)
  - Summer (DST): UTC+2 (CEST)

Hodbina is a village in the City of Mostar, Bosnia and Herzegovina.

== Demographics ==
According to the 2013 census, its population was 813.

Ethnicity in 2013
| Ethnicity | Number | Percentage |
|---|---|---|
| Serbs | 357 | 43.9% |
| Bosniaks | 276 | 33.9% |
| Croats | 156 | 19.2% |
| other/undeclared | 24 | 3.0% |
| Total | 813 | 100% |
