= Malo Polje, Mostar =

Malo Polje
- Village
- Location within Bosnia and Herzegovina
- Coordinates: 43.2370702°N 17.8610658°E
- Country: Bosnia and Herzegovina
- Entity: Federation of Bosnia and Herzegovina
- Canton: Herzegovina-Neretva
- Municipality: City of Mostar

Area
  - Total: 3.58 sq mi (9.27 km^{2})

Population (2013)
  - Total: 469
  - Density: 131/sq mi (50.6/km^{2})
- Time zone: UTC+1 (CET)
  - Summer (DST): UTC+2 (CEST)

Malo Polje is a village in the City of Mostar, Bosnia and Herzegovina.

== Demographics ==
According to the 2013 census, its population was 469.

Ethnicity in 2013
Ethnicity	Number	Percentage
Bosniaks	347	74.0%
Serbs	115	24.5%
Croats	2	0.4%
other/undeclared	5	1.1%
Total	469	100%
