= Bregava =

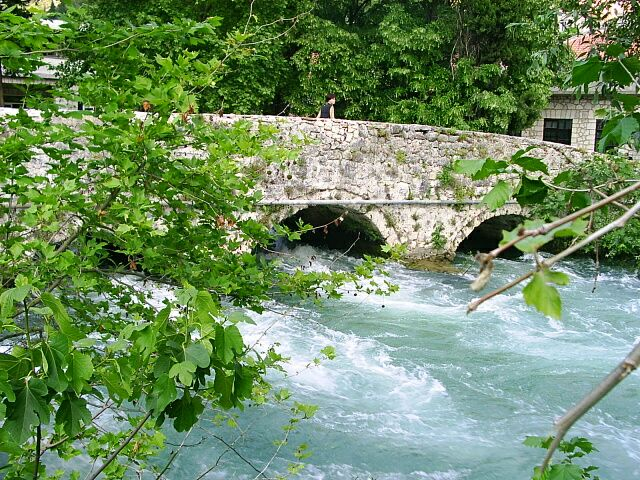
- Ćuprija bridge on Bregava river

- Location within Bosnia and Herzegovina

Location
- Country: Bosnia and Herzegovina

Physical characteristics
- Source
  - location: Near town of Stolac
- Mouth
  - location: The Neretva river near town of Čapljina
  - coordinates: 43.0994°N 17.7144°E
- Length: 20 km (12 mi)

Basin features
- Progression: Neretva→ Adriatic Sea

The Bregava (Serbian Cyrillic: Брегава) is a sinking river in Bosnia and Herzegovina that passes through the town of Stolac. It is a left tributary of the Neretva river.

The river Bregava and its buildings - bridges, mills and stamping mills over the river - constitutes the backbone of the urban layout of Stolac. It passes through two waterfalls in Stolac, one of which is natural and the other artificial, and continues its way through the shallow and fertile Bregava gorge, leading to Badanj Cave. It is famous for its pure turquoise colour and clean waters, like the Neretva river which passes through Mostar. Many natural beaches are spread along the river.

== Natural environment ==
The Bregava river also gathers a rich flora biodiversity, wild peppermint, sage, thyme, almond trees and numerous fruit trees (pomegranates, kiwis, plums, grapes...), and fauna living around, butterflies, trout, ducks, numerous diverse birds and water snakes.

=== River biodiversity ===
The Bregava river is a major habitat for an endemic trout species known under its vernacular name as Softmouth trout. Other species inhabit the river, such as various endangered species of cyprinids, endemics to the Neretva watershed. Endemic fish species of the Neretva river

== Cultural-historical heritage ==
Bridges: the most important surviving bridges on the Bregava are Ćuprija (Inat ćuprija), the oldest surviving bridge on the Bregava, assumed from the style of building to date from the medieval period; Podgradska ćuprija, the second oldest bridge in Stolac municipality, believed to have been built in the early 18th century; the bridge in Begovina, most recent of the three stone bridges in Stolac; the Sara Kašiković bridge, built according to its inscription in 1896. This was a privately owned bridge, and had gates to close it off; it is the largest privately owned bridge; the bridge leading to Ada; the small bridge by the Šarić summer residence; and the bridge by the Ali Pasha mosque.

Mills: these are of fairly uniform character, without major differences in the way they were built. In 1664 Evliya Çelebi wrote in his travelogue that there were ten watermills in Dol on the Bregava. In the 18th century Memibegović recounts that the river Bregava runs through Stolac with 180 waterwheels. The oldest known Vakufnama (deed of perpetual endowment) with details of mills was issued for a maintenance endowment dating from 1815, as a result of which the mills can be assumed to date from the early 19th century. They are built of rough-cut stone and are plain and unadorned. Their size is determined by their length, which in turn depends on the number of arches by which the building spans the two banks of the river. The most important of the existing mills are the mill above the Sara Kašiković bridge, the Behmen mill, the Turković mill, and the mills with stamping mills.

Stamp mills: these feature mainly in combination with watermills. As a rule, they constitute a small group of buildings, one of which is invariably the stamping mill office where deals were struck. Another is the stamping mill itself, with the upper floor used for drying laundry in winter and used for other purposes in summer. These plain, unadorned buildings are purely of a utilitarian nature.

== See also ==
- Buna
- Bunica
- Trebižat
- Krupa (Neretva)
- Hutovo Blato
- Daorson
- List of Illyrian cities
