= Vrelo Bune =

Spring of Buna river in Bosnia and Herzegovina

- Buna Spring with the Blagaj Tekija
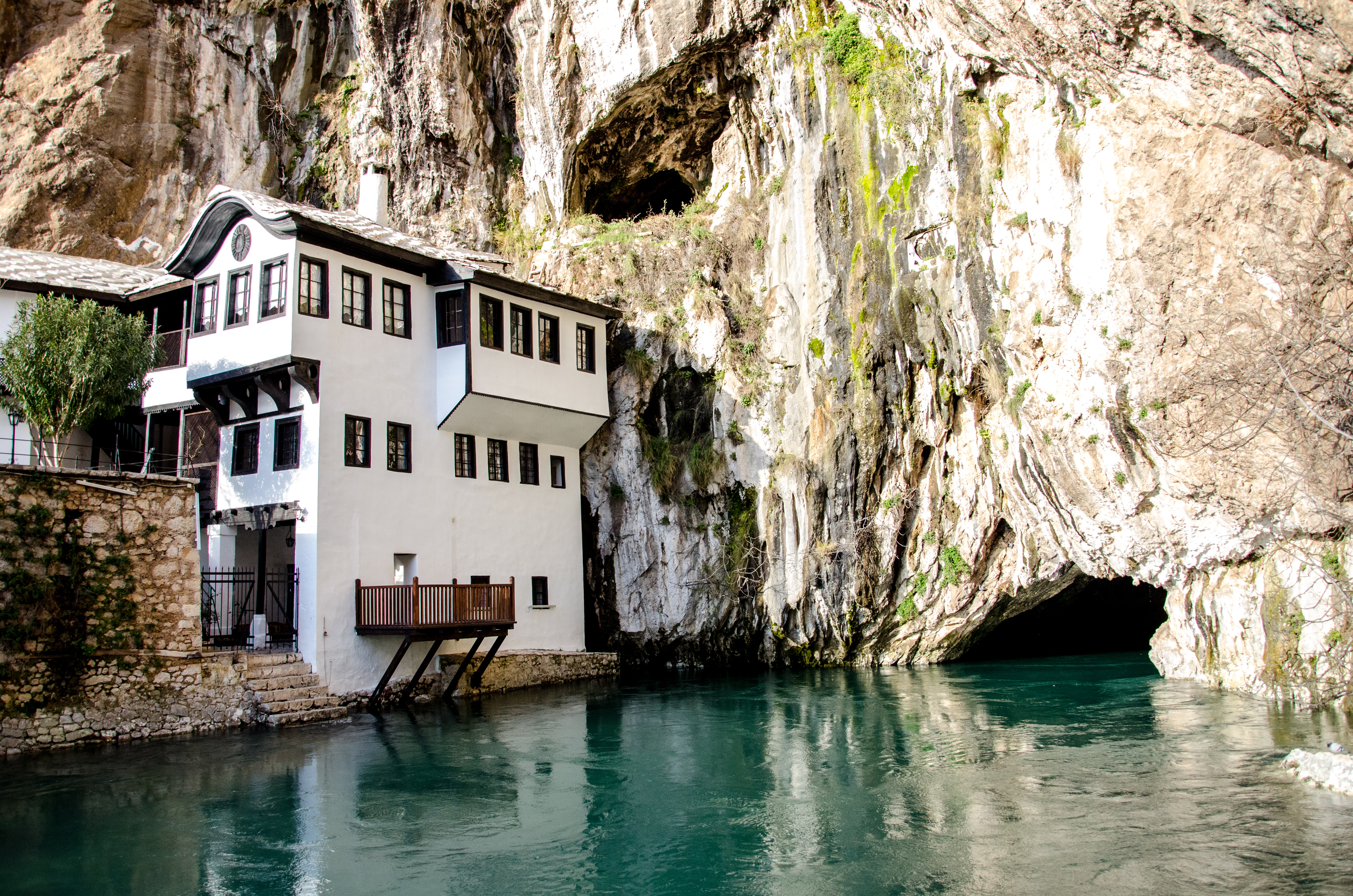
- Buna Spring (Vrelo Bune) with the Blagaj Tekija

- Location within Bosnia and Herzegovina
- Interactive map of Vrelo Bune
- Name origin: Latin: 'Bona' means Good, fine; (see also Latin names of rivers)
- Location: Blagaj, Mostar, Herzegovina-Neretva Canton, Bosnia and Herzegovina
- Coordinates: 43.257266°N 17.903581°E
- Elevation: 140
- Type: Karst spring
- Provides water for: Buna river
- Discharge: 30

Vrelo Bune (Serbo-Croatian Cyrillic: Врело Буне, transl. 'Buna Wellspring') is a natural and architectural ensemble located at the spring of the Buna River near Blagaj, a village-town, and is part of the wider "Townscape ensemble of the town of Blagaj — Historical and Natural Heritage of Bosnia and Herzegovina" (featuring Ottoman Mediterranean architecture dating back to 1520), situated southeast of Mostar, Bosnia and Herzegovina. The primary rationale behind the decision of the KONS to designate the site as protected and thus include it in the protected area of Blagaj as a historic urban area, lies in the harmonious coexistence of natural and architectural, cultural, and historical elements, as evidenced by the "distinctive quality of the coexistence of the natural and the man-made" and the "integration of the physical structure into the landscape".

== Vrelo Bune ==
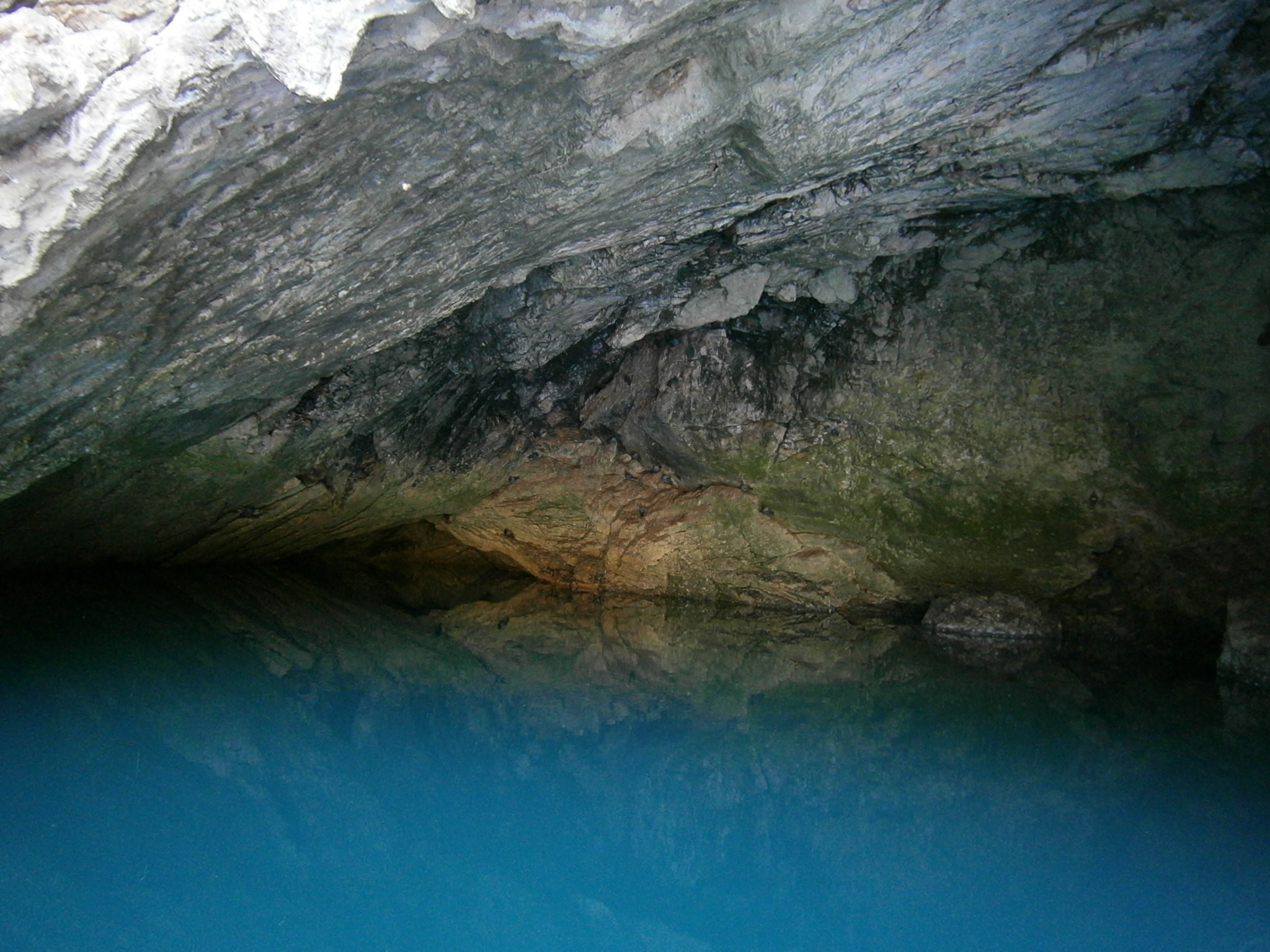
A Buna spring within the cavern

The Buna river, a short waterway in Bosnia and Herzegovina, serves as a left-bank tributary of the Neretva River. Originating from the Vrelo Bune (Serbo-Croatian: Vrelo Bune), a robust karstic spring, it emerges from a vast cavern beneath a towering vertical cliff. This area is notable for its diverse above-ground and underground hydrography. The Buna's source ranks among the largest springs in Europe, yielding approximately 30 m^{3}/s of exceptionally cold and pristine water.

== Historical and natural heritage ==
Blagaj, situated in Mostar, stands out as one of Bosnia and Herzegovina's most prized urban-rural structures. Its zenith in development occurred during the 15th and 16th centuries, marking a period when stone construction flourished extensively. Initially, stone-built residences were exclusive to the affluent class, but over time, even lower-class families erected numerous substantial stone houses and summer retreats. The natural and architectural ensemble of Blagaj forms a self-contained spatial and topographical unit.

Renowned for its varied flora and plethora of endemic species, the region boasts lush evergreen and deciduous thicket species at lower altitudes, while the hills at higher elevations host sparse forests. The fertile arable land is conducive to agriculture typical of the Mediterranean climate.

=== Blagaj tekke ===
The architectural ensemble of the Blagaj tekija, a Sufi lodge, is situated near the source of the Buna river, not far from the heart of Blagaj. Nestled into the natural surroundings, the musafirhana (guest house) and türbe (mausoleum) seamlessly integrate with the cliffs, Buna source, and mills, forming a unified entity. Both the musafirhana of the Blagaj tekija and the türbe have been meticulously preserved. The musafirhana predates 1664, with a reconstruction in 1851; however, its original appearance remains unknown. Over time, the building underwent several repairs. The ensemble of the Blagaj Tekke likely emerged shortly after the establishment of Ottoman rule in Herzegovina, around 1520 at the latest.

=== Bridges ===
There were four bridges spanning the 9 kilometers of the Buna river: two in Blagaj, one in Kosor, and one in the village of Buna. Blagaj's bridges, namely the Karađoz-beg bridge and the Leho bridge, exhibit certain deviations from the typical form of 16th-century Ottoman architecture.

- The Karađoz-beg bridge, funded by Zaim hajji Mehmed-beg, also known as Karađoz, predates 1570 and is located on the road leading to the town of Stolac. This bridge boasts five arches, with a progressive increase in span towards the center.
- The Leho bridge or Lehina ćuprija in Donja Mahala predates 1664 and is believed to have been commissioned by Haseći Ali-aga Kolaković. It features three arches, notably wider than those of the Karađoz-beg bridge.

=== Mills ===
Mill buildings along the Buna river are modest stone structures featuring gabled roofs adorned with stone slabs, housing one or more millstones.

- The mills near the Tekke. Situated in close proximity to the Buna's source, channels divert water to power these mills. Several mills were constructed, including one stamping and two fulling mills, each positioned on opposite banks of the river. A portion of the mill on the right bank has been repurposed into a souvenir shop, leaving behind only the stone walls of the original structure.
- The mills in the Velagić residential complex. This mill spans both the riverbank and a branch of the Buna flowing beneath the Velagić residential complex. It comprises two sections: one built on dry land with both ground and upper floors, and the other, a single-story structure erected over the river, supported by a series of arches spanning the banks. The former served as living quarters for the miller, while the latter housed seven mills arranged at regular intervals. These mills, including stamping mills, were utilized for washing wool and fulling cloth.

=== Residential quarters ===
Residential complexes were notably secluded, emphasizing the courtyard as the central area of the dwelling. Comprising various buildings for different functions, these complexes were set within open plots, seamlessly integrating with the natural surroundings.

- The Kolaković house stands as a remarkable specimen of Mediterranean Herzegovina's residential architecture, showcasing the evolution of the "Ottoman Bosnian" house.
- The Velagić residential complex, constructed prior to 1776, represents a distinctive example of residential architecture of its era, featuring numerous functional components essential for daily life. Despite being enclosed by high walls from the outside world, the interior of the complex harmonizes with the natural environment and the Buna river. Interconnected courtyards are paved with river pebbles. The Velagić house complex epitomizes a complete family residence with auxiliary structures, offering insight into the residential lifestyle of Mediterranean Herzegovina in bygone times.
- The Kosić tower, representing medieval residential architecture, serves as a typical fortified house. Located on the town's outskirts, it likely functioned as a defensive outpost, especially considering the presence of the Blagaj Fortress on the opposite side.

== UNESCO World Heritage Site nomination ==
According to the nomination for the list of national monuments in Bosnia and Herzegovina, titled "Townscape ensemble of the town of Blagaj," prepared by the Institute for the Protection of the Cultural, Historical and Natural Heritage of Bosnia and Herzegovina, the source of the Buna river, with its cliffs, constitutes a geomorphological natural monument, while the source itself is designated as a hydrological natural monument. Blagaj's architectural heritage and old urban quarters (mahalas) suggest that buildings of significant monumental and townscape value are concentrated in a relatively small area along the Buna river. The urban structures, spatial layout, and organization trace their origins from the medieval outskirts of the fortress, which evolved during the Ottoman period into a kasaba (village-town). Blagaj's urban design reflects both Oriental and Mediterranean influences, with the settlement's development being shaped by natural phenomena, terrain configuration, and socio-economic factors. This resulted in a seamless integration of each building with its surroundings, achieving perfect harmony.

== See also ==
- List of karst springs
