= Kosor, Mostar =

Village in Mostar, Bosnia and Herzegovina

Kosor
- Village
- Location within Bosnia and Herzegovina
- Coordinates: 43.2532823°N 17.8549074°E
- Country: Bosnia and Herzegovina
- Entity: Federation of Bosnia and Herzegovina
- Canton: Herzegovina-Neretva
- Municipality: City of Mostar

Area
  - Total: 1.09 sq mi (2.82 km^{2})

Population (2013)
  - Total: 507
  - Density: 466/sq mi (180/km^{2})
- Time zone: UTC+1 (CET)
  - Summer (DST): UTC+2 (CEST)

Kosor is a village in the City of Mostar, Bosnia and Herzegovina.

== Demographics ==
According to the 2013 census, its population was 507.

Ethnicity in 2013
Ethnicity	Number	Percentage
Bosniaks	436	86.0%
Croats	59	11.6%
Serbs	5	1.0%
other/undeclared	7	1.4%
Total	507	100%
