= Buna (Neretva) =

River in Bosnia and Herzegovina

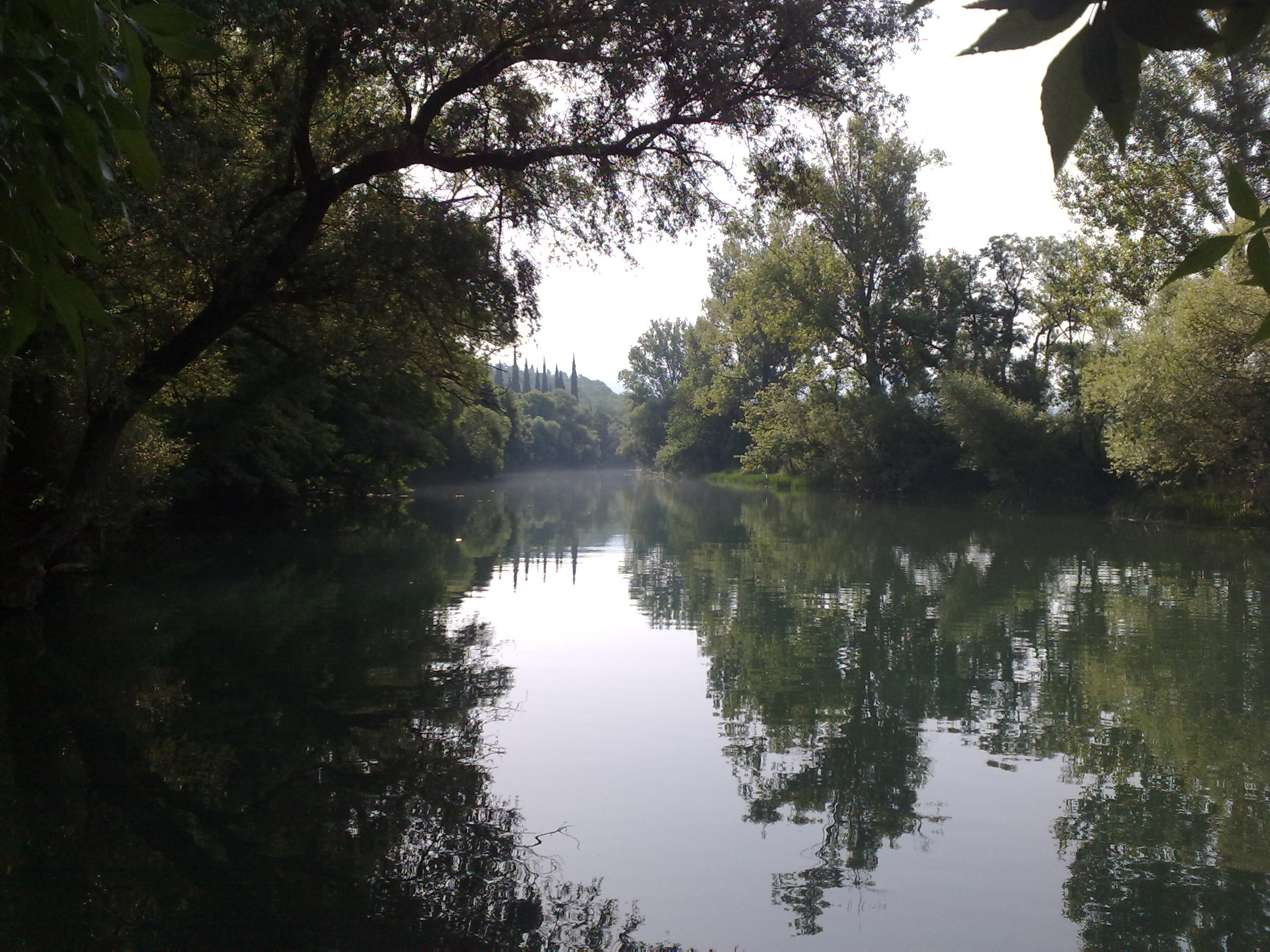
- The Buna river

- Location of the Buna mouth in Bosnia and Herzegovina

Location
- Country: Bosnia and Herzegovina

Physical characteristics
- Source
  - location: Vrelo Bune near Blagaj, Mostar
- Mouth
  - location: The Neretva near Buna
  - coordinates: 43.2405°N 17.8340°E
- Length: 9 km (5.6 mi)

Basin features
- Progression: Neretva→ Adriatic Sea

The Buna (Serbian Cyrillic: Буна) is a short river in Bosnia and Herzegovina; it is a left-bank tributary of the Neretva. Its source, Vrelo Bune (Buna Spring), is a strong karstic spring located near the village of Blagaj, southeast of Mostar. Vrelo Bune is one of the strongest springs in Europe and has extremely cold water. The Buna flows west for approximately 9 km, starts at Blagaj and, meandering through the villages of Blagaj, Kosor, Malo Polje and Hodbina, joins the Neretva near the settlement Buna. The site of confluence is called Buna Canals. The Bunica river is the main left-bank tributary of the Buna. The Buna is major habitat for an endemic trout species known under its vernacular name as Softmouth trout.

Old Karađoz-beg Bridge, an Ottoman stone arch bridge, still stands in Blagaj and is declared National Monument of Bosnia and Herzegovina by KONS.

== See also ==
- Vrelo Bunice
- Mostarska Bijela
- Hutovo Blato
- Daorson
- List of Illyrian cities
