= Počitelj Citadel =

Medieval castle in Bosnia and Herzegovina

- Bosnian, Croatian: Počiteljska tvrđava Serbian: Почитељска тврђава
- Part of Walled town of Počitelj
- Počitelj in Bosnia and Herzegovina
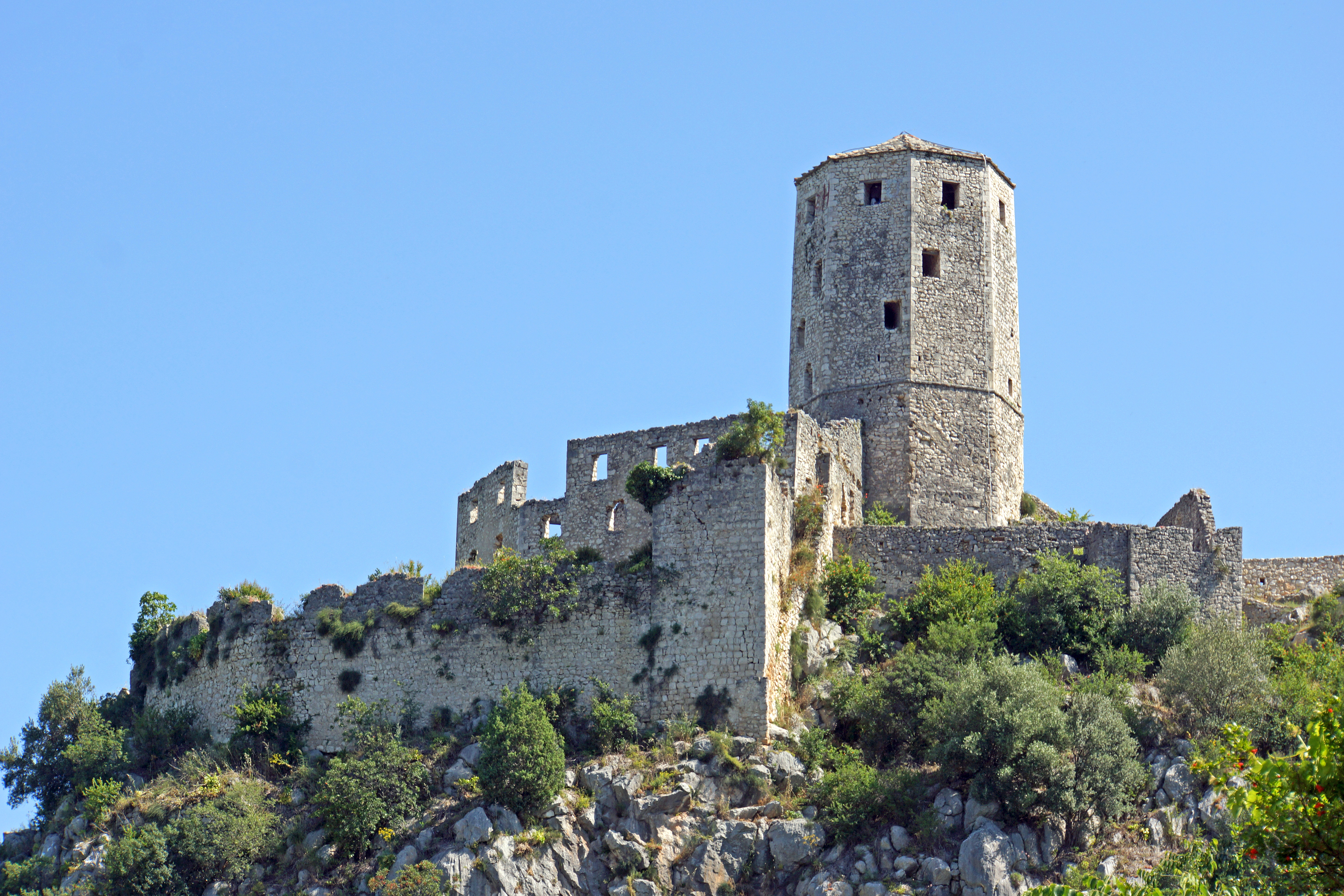

Site information
- Type: Citadel
- Owner: The Government of Bosnia and Herzegovina
- Open to the public: Yes
- Condition: Preserved

Location
- Coordinates: 43.1353°N 17.7317°E

Site history
- Built: c. 1383
- Built for: King Tvrtko I of Bosnia
- In use: c. 1996
- Materials: Limestone in dry stone walling

Garrison information
- Designations

KONS of Bosnia and Herzegovina
- Official name: Počitelj Citadel
- Type: Cultural
- Designated: 5 November 2005
- Part of: Walled town of Počitelj

Citadel Počitelj (Bosnian, Croatian: Počiteljska tvrđava; Serbian: Почитељска тврђава) is a castle in Bosnia and Herzegovina. This fortress was built by King Tvrtko I of Bosnia in 1383, and had a role of control a merchant route between Bosnian inland and the Adriatic sea coast, via Drijeva trg, through the valley of the Neretva river.

The Ottoman Empire extended fortifications greatly, and developed a settlement, with a housings, bath and the mosque. The main tower of Počitelj citadel, Gavran-captain tower (Bosnian: Gavran-kapetanova kula), is erected on a karstic rock hanging high above the Neretva river. Today, it overlooks the historic walled town of Počitelj.

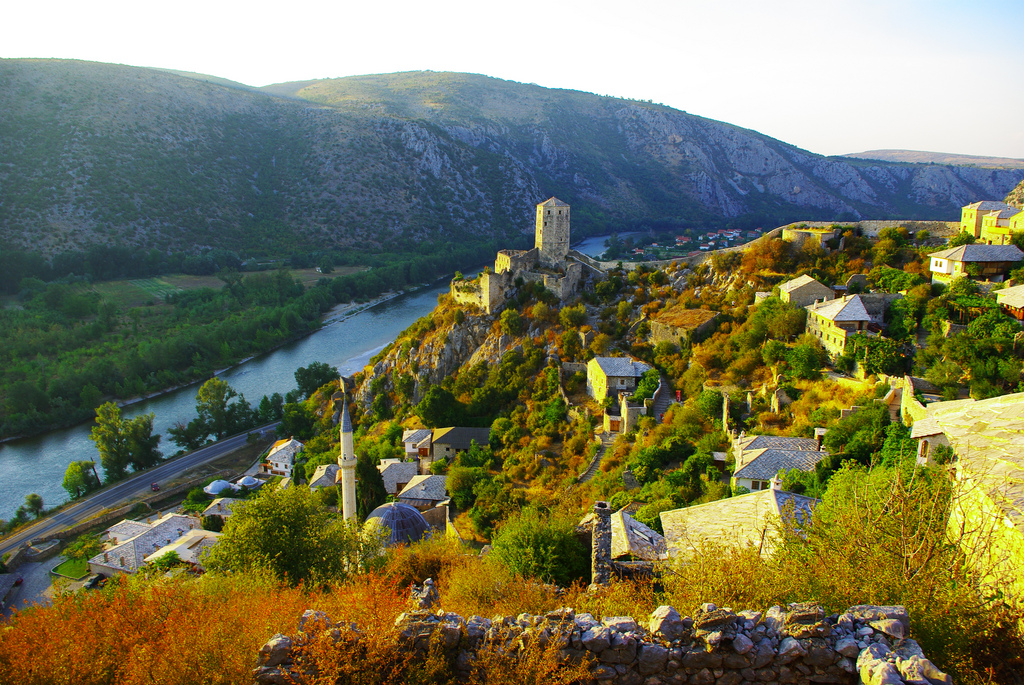

== See also ==
- Blagaj Fortress
