= Walled city of Vratnik =

City in Sarajevo, Bosnia and Herzegovina

Walled city of Vratnik Stari grad Vratnik
- Fortified old town
- Old Vratnik Fort
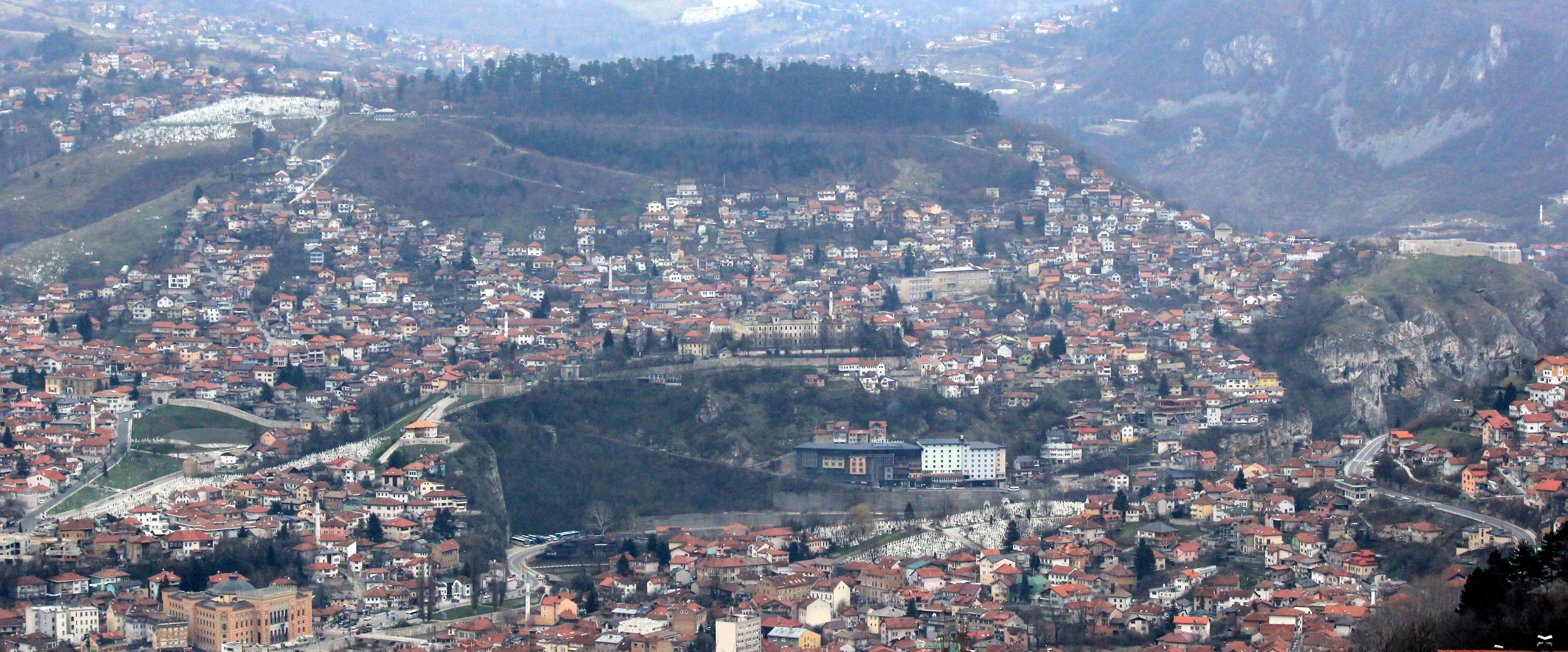
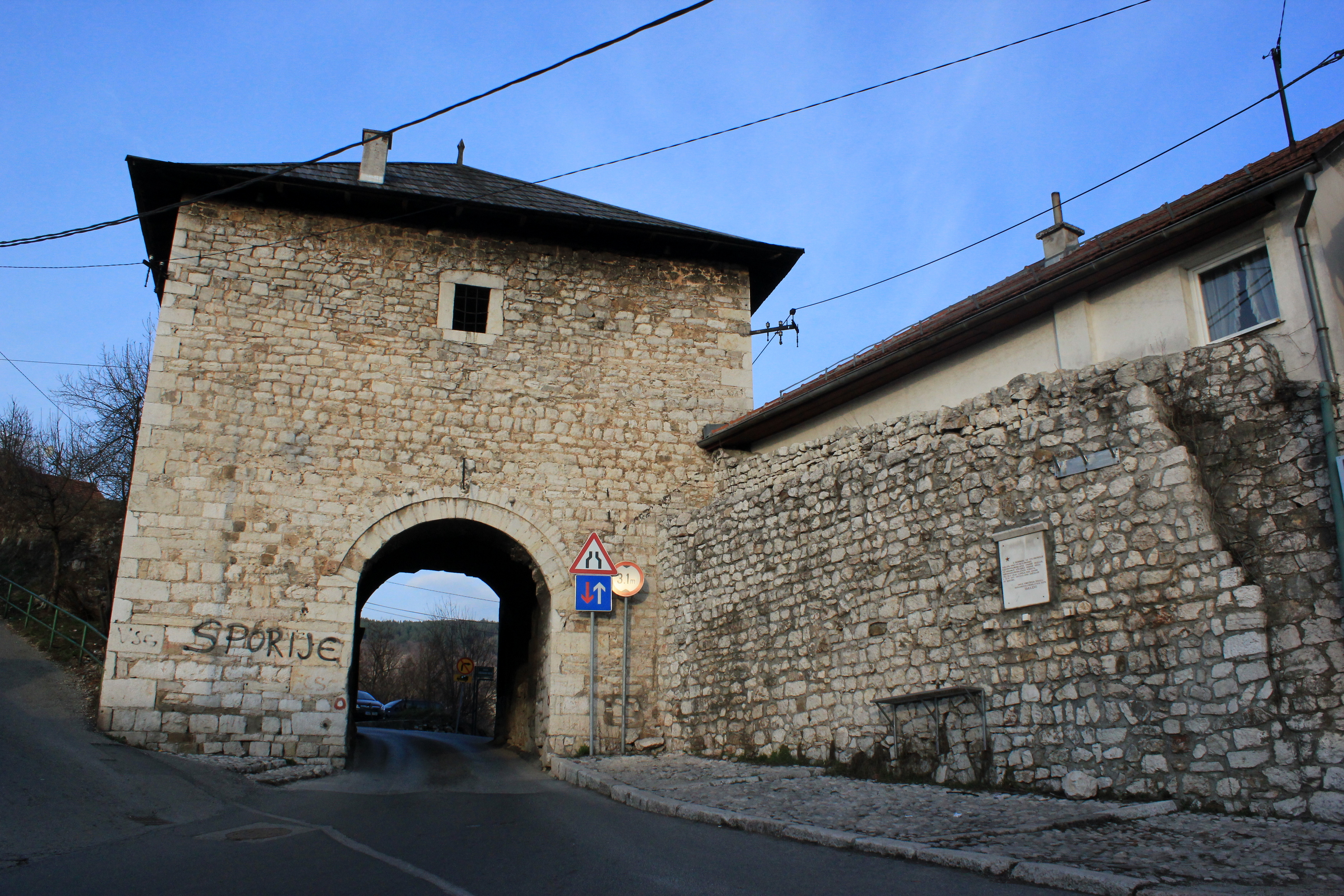
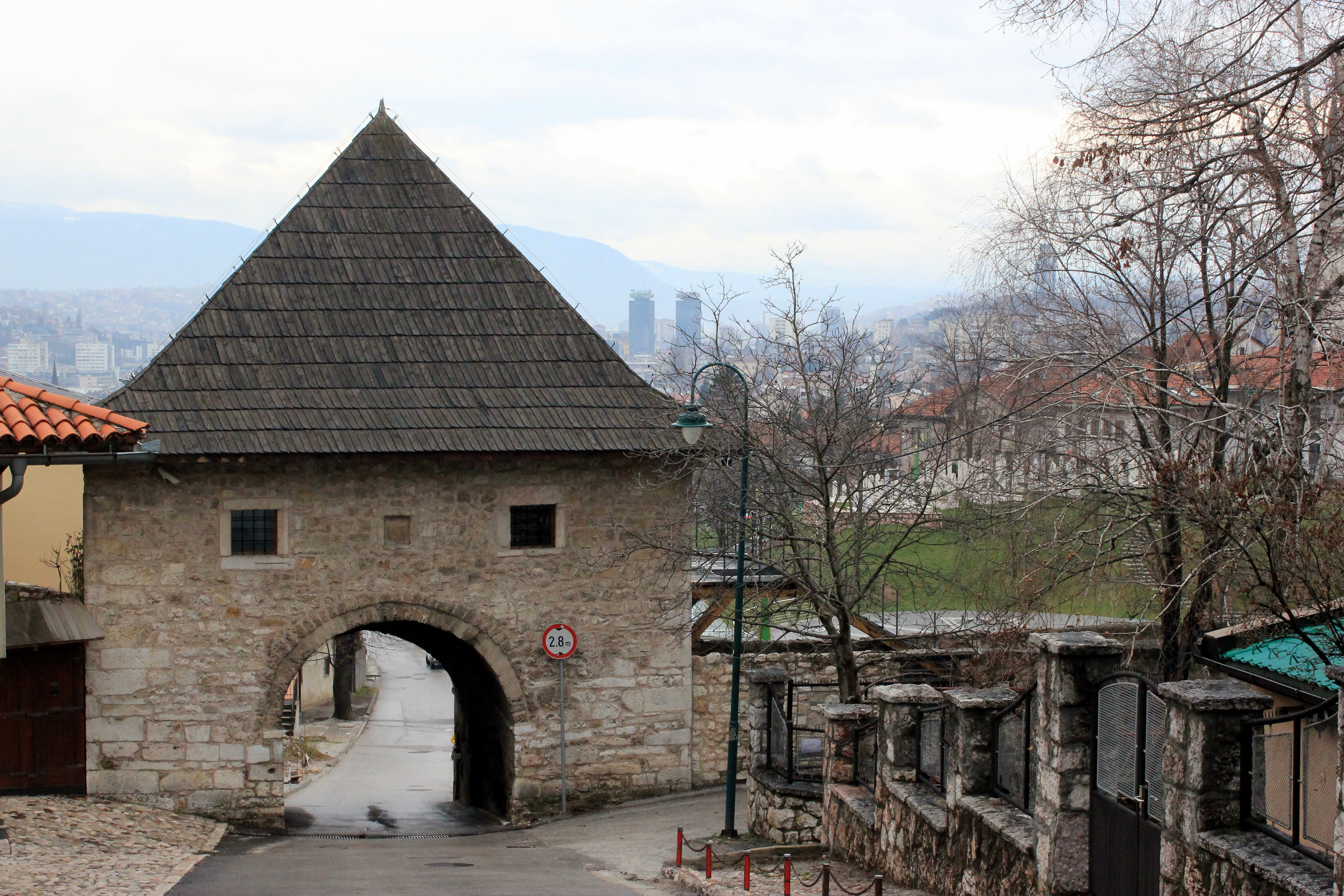
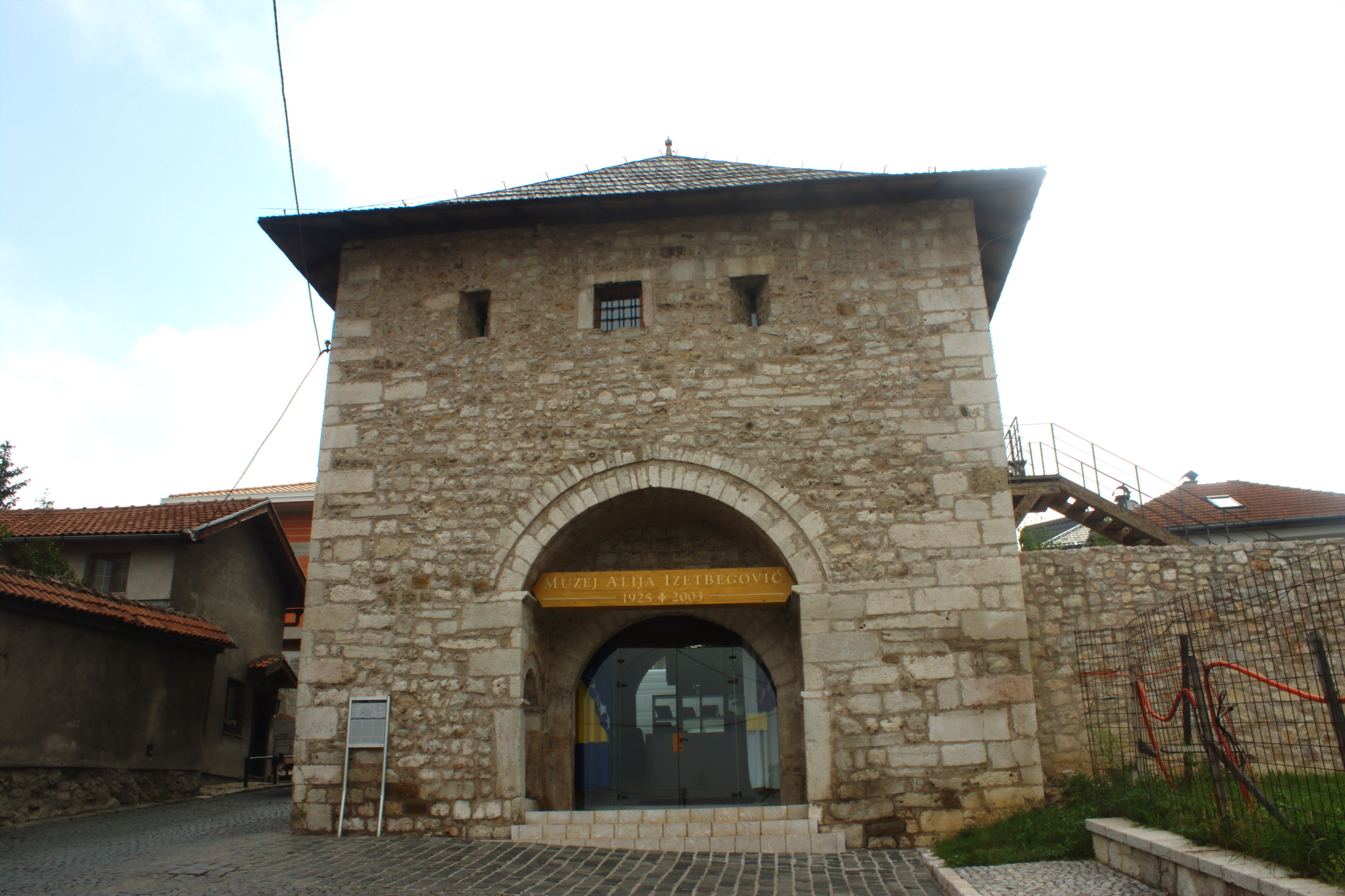
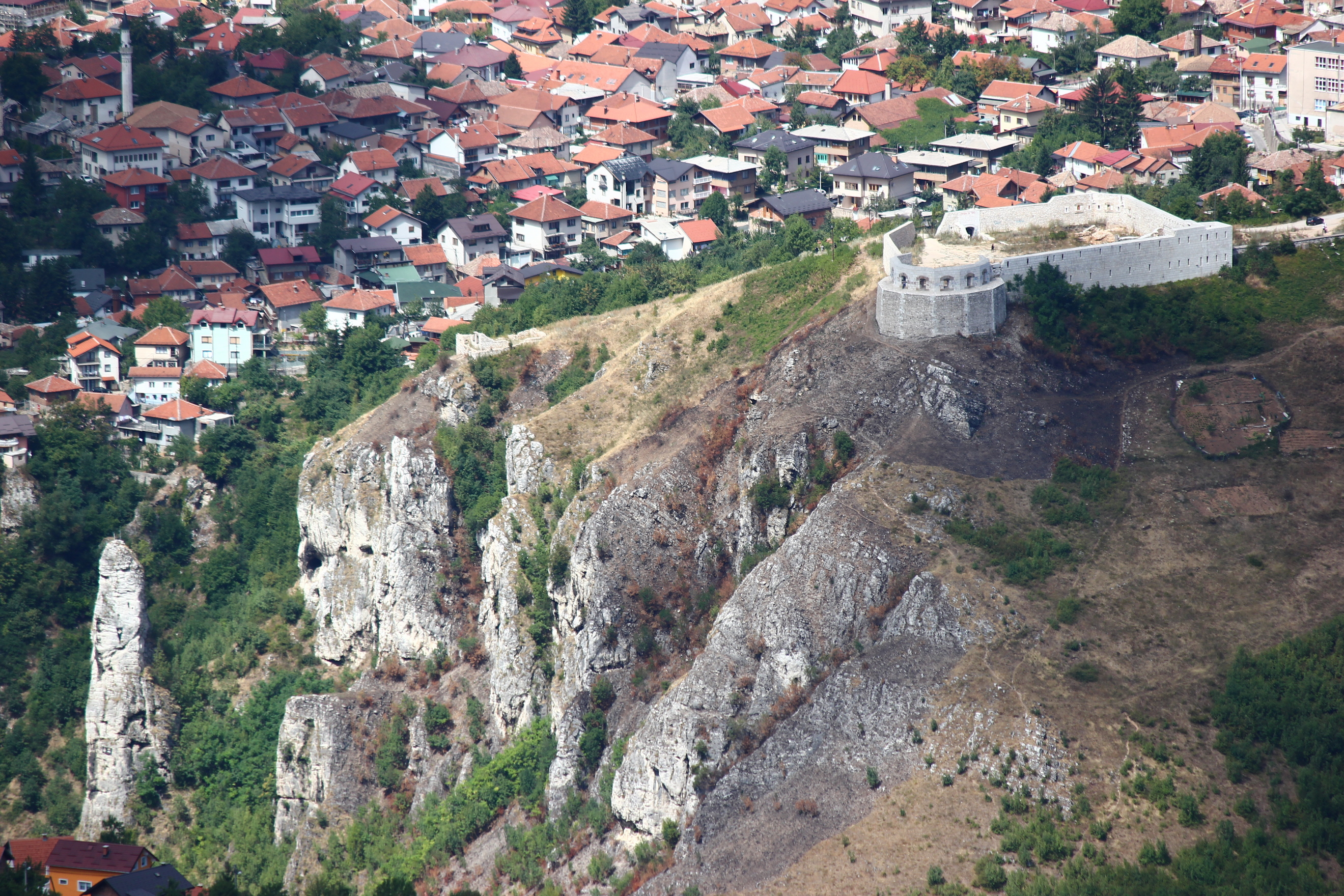
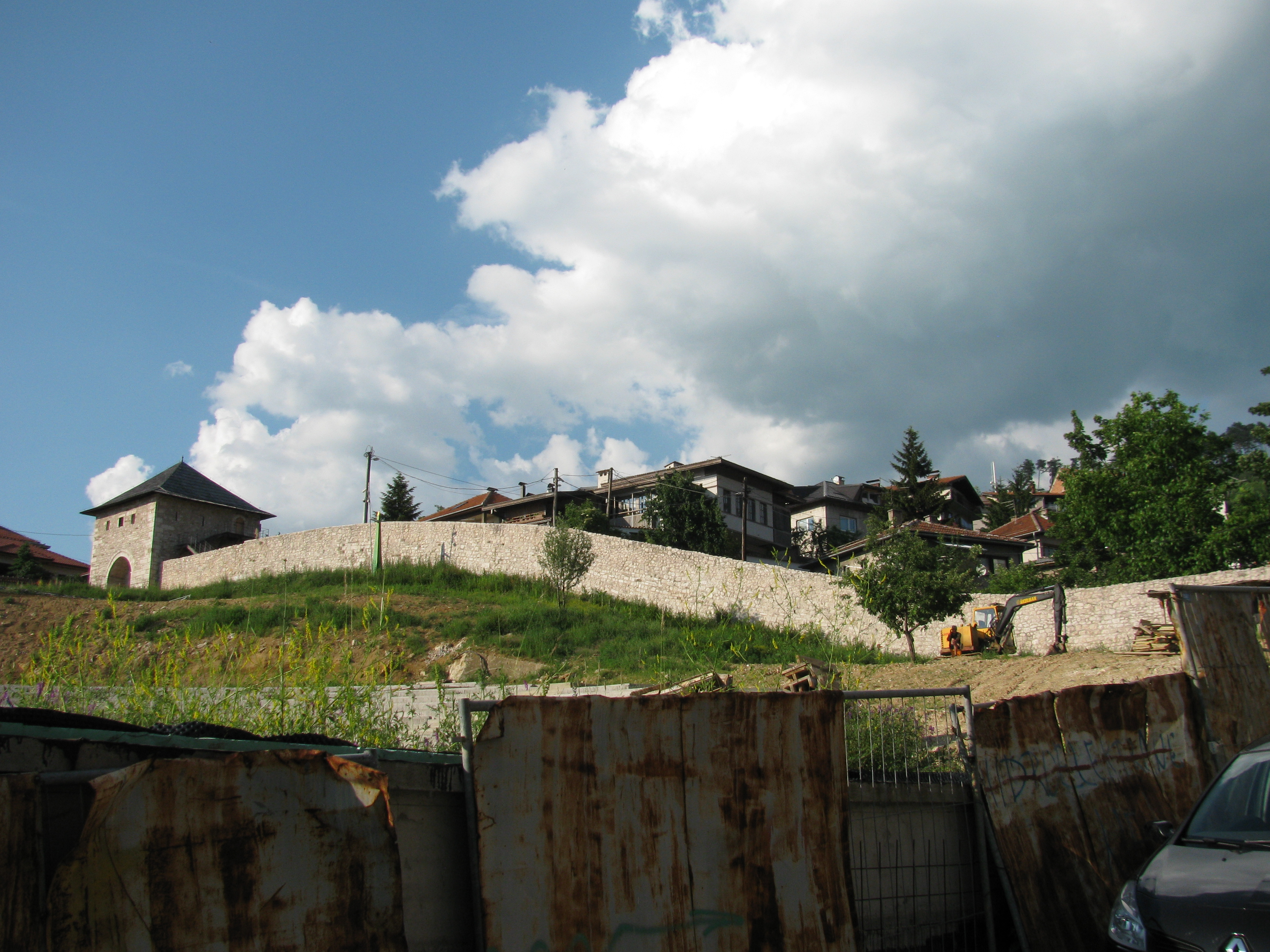
- Nickname: Zidine Vratnika
- Interactive map of Walled city of Vratnik
- Walled city of Vratnik, Bosnia and Herzegovina
- Coordinates: 43.862365°N 18.440702°E
- Country: Bosnia and Herzegovina
- Entity: Federation of Bosnia and Herzegovina
- Canton: Sarajevo Canton
- City: Sarajevo
- Municipality: Stari Grad, Sarajevo
- Named for: doorway (transl. vrata)
- Time zone: UTC+1 (CET)
  - Summer (DST): UTC+2 (CEST)
- Area code: +387

KONS of Bosnia and Herzegovina
- Official name: Old fort of Vratnik, the architectural ensemble
- Type: Category 0 monument within the urban ensemble of Sarajevo
- Criteria: A, B, C iii.iv., D i.ii.iv, E v., F ii., G v.,
- Designated: 16 March 2005 (?th session)
- Reference no.: 2547
- Session No.: 05.1-2-269/04-6

The Walled city of Vratnik, also Old Vratnik Fort, is located in Vratnik neighborhood, in Sarajevo, Bosnia and Herzegovina. It represents urban core within the wider neighbourhood of the same name. Since 2005 the KONS designated walled area of the neighborhood a national monument of Bosnia and Herzegovina.

== History ==
Up until the brief but devastating terror-raid of Prince Eugene of Savoy in 1697, when city was sacked and numerous buildings burnt and rest of the city severely damaged, Sarajevo was an open city. This tragic event prompted governor Ahmed-paša Rustempašić Skopljak in 1727, to order Vratnik town and most of its core to be redeveloped into the fortified "walled city".

Ahmed-paša brought five fortress architects from Dubrovnik to supervise the construction. After it was completed in 1739, there were three tower-gates (Sirokac, Ploca and Visegrad) and five forts. Bijela/White and Zuta/Yellow fortresses are the most significant ones. According to his decree, the defense wall was supposed to be "one-hour walk long, two yards thick, and ten yards tall."

Legend has it that Vratnik got its name due to fact that it symbolised the "doors of Sarajevo". The fort doors, which were made out of oak wood, were closed at each sundown and again opened at sunrise. Sultan Mehmed Fatih entered through these doors and had a white mosque with sahat-kula that was built in his honor. He used White fortress as camp inside the old Vratnik town.

The fortresses, defensive walls and the gates and towers have been important symbols for the population living in the neighborhood and its vicinity. Today the Martyr’s Memorial cemetery is another example of historical and symbolic values ingrained into the neighborhood history.

Inside Vratnik walls lies an old town

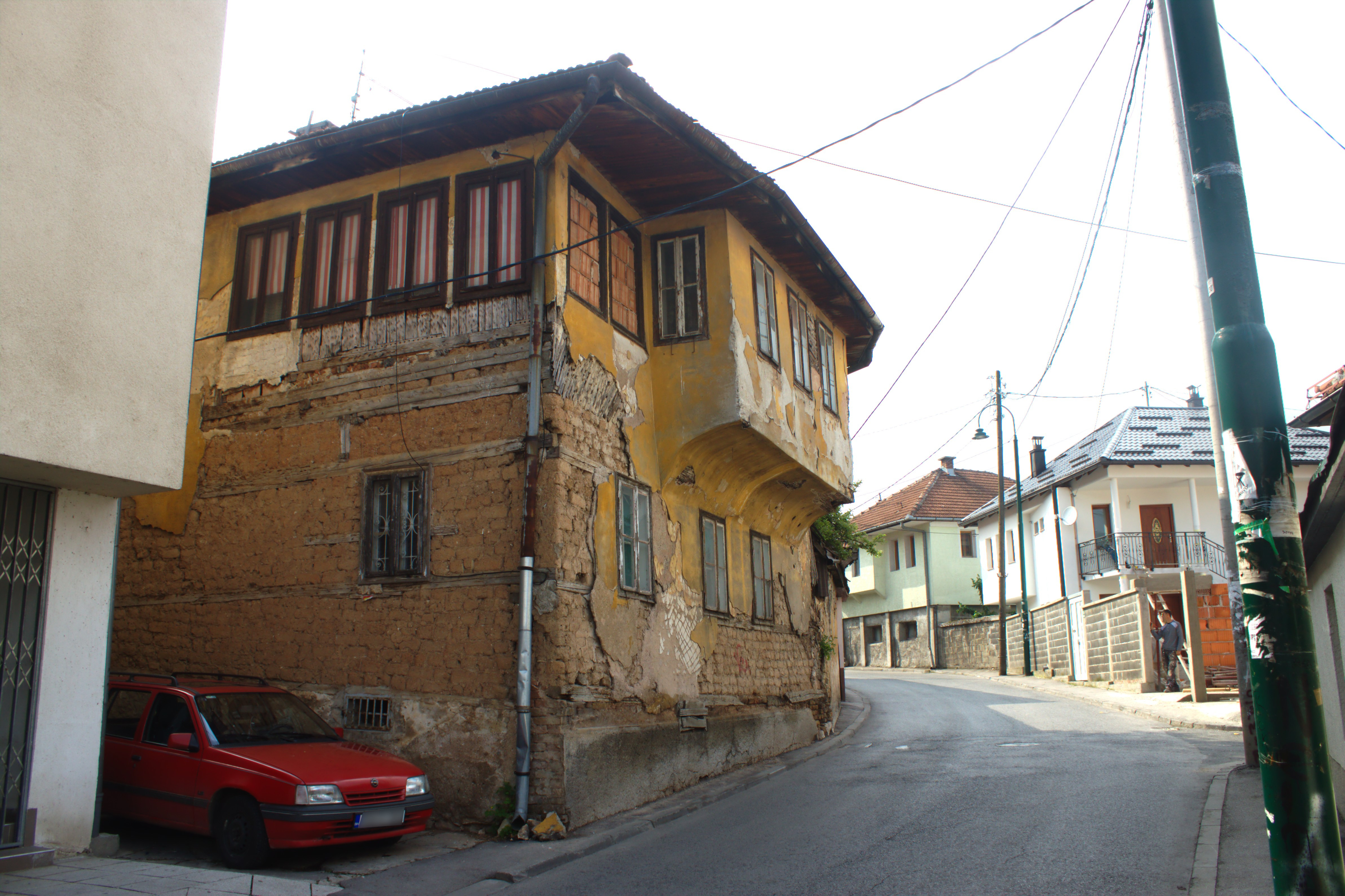
Beautiful Bosnian architecture

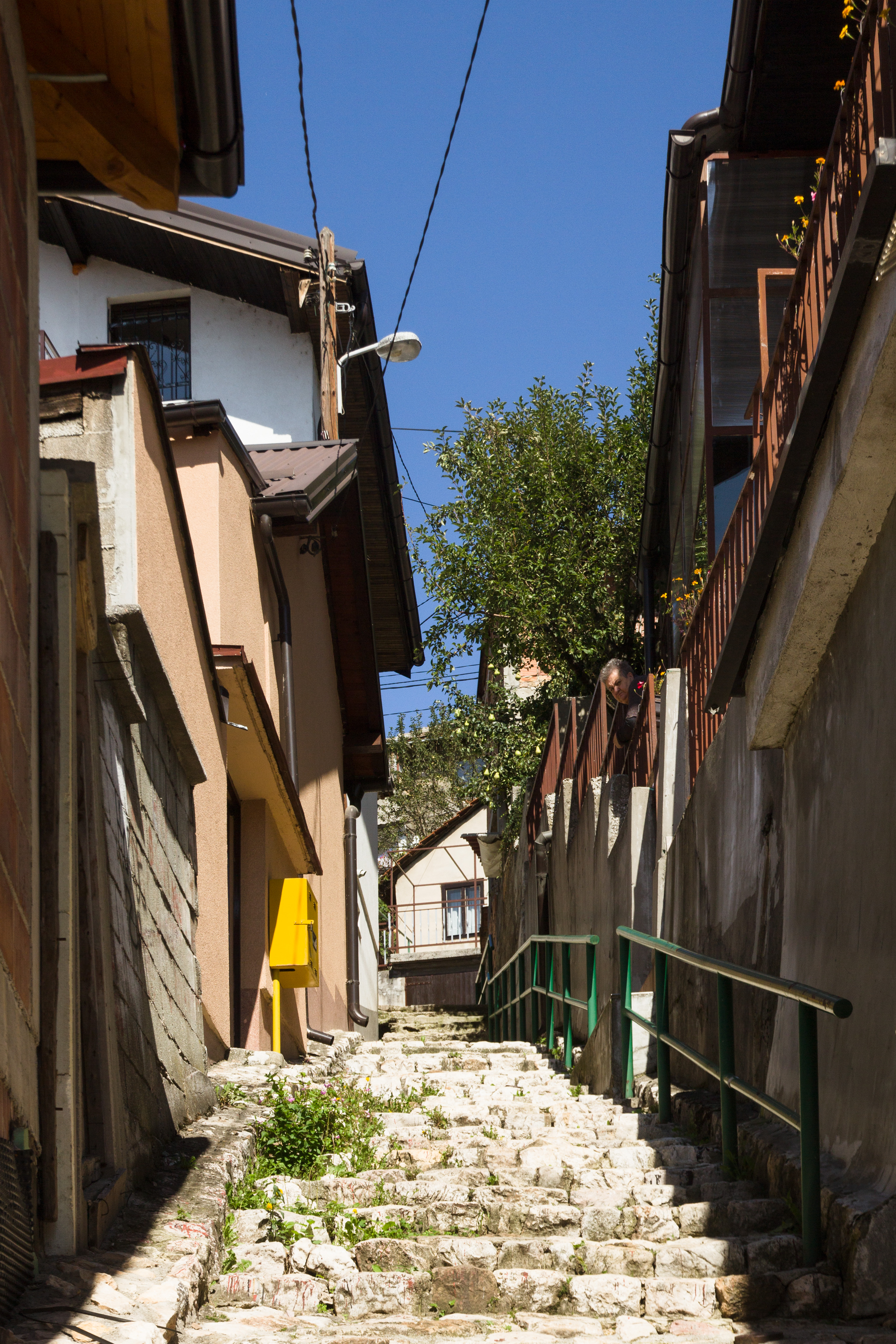
Tight and steep street spaces

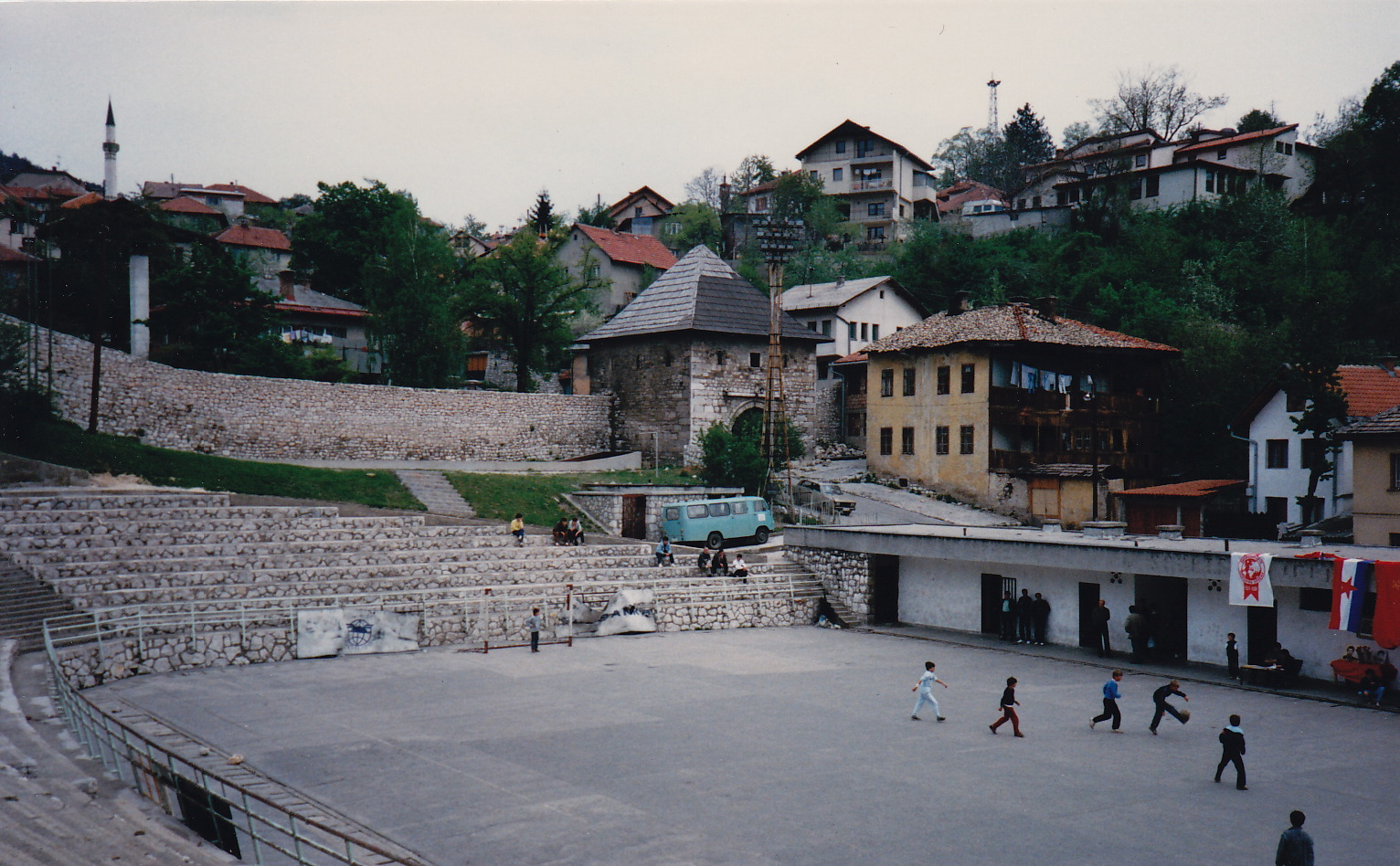
Fortification walls and Sirokac Tower (May 1987)

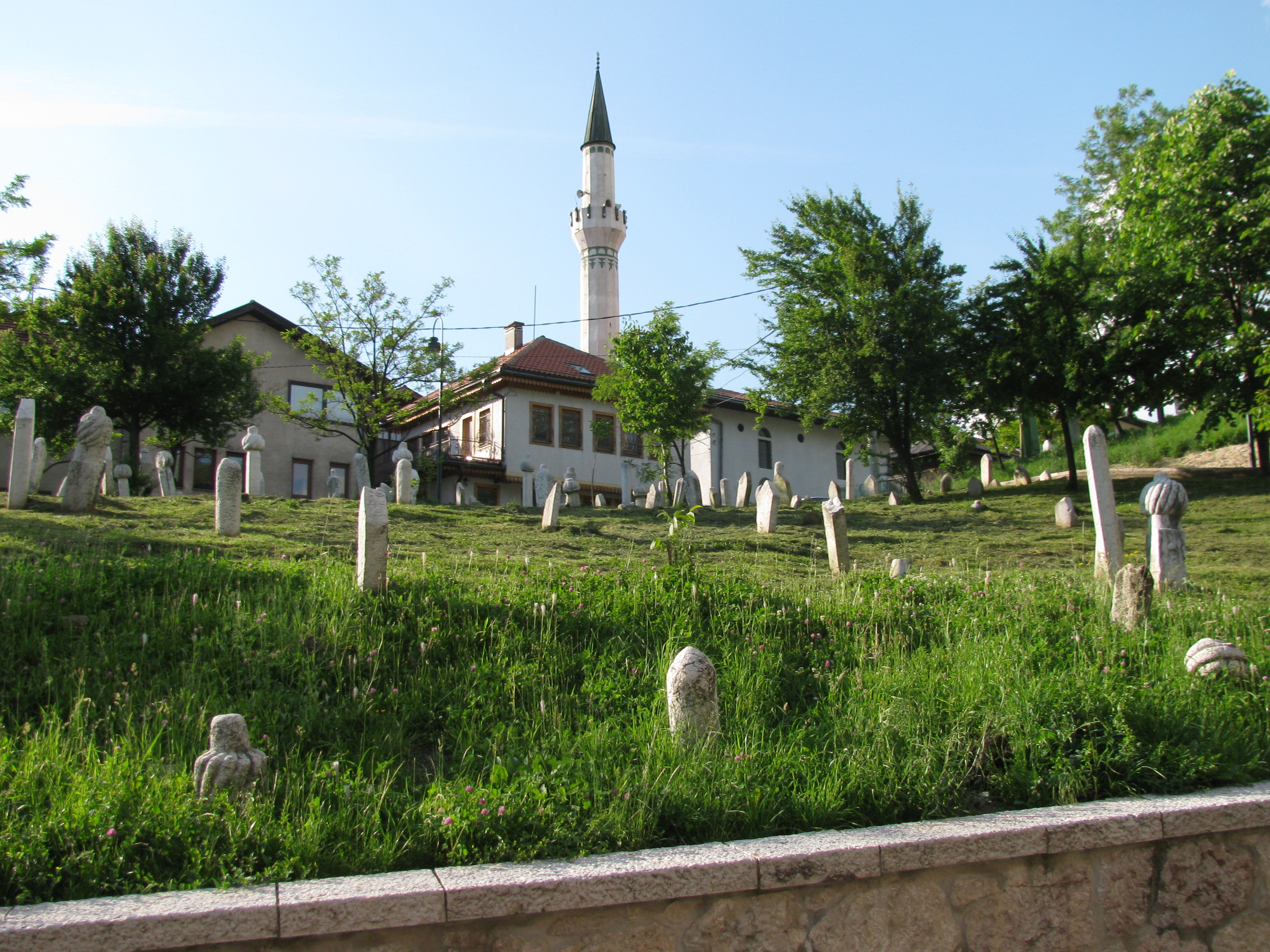
Mišćina mosque (2010)

== Description ==
=== Vratnik perimeter walls ===
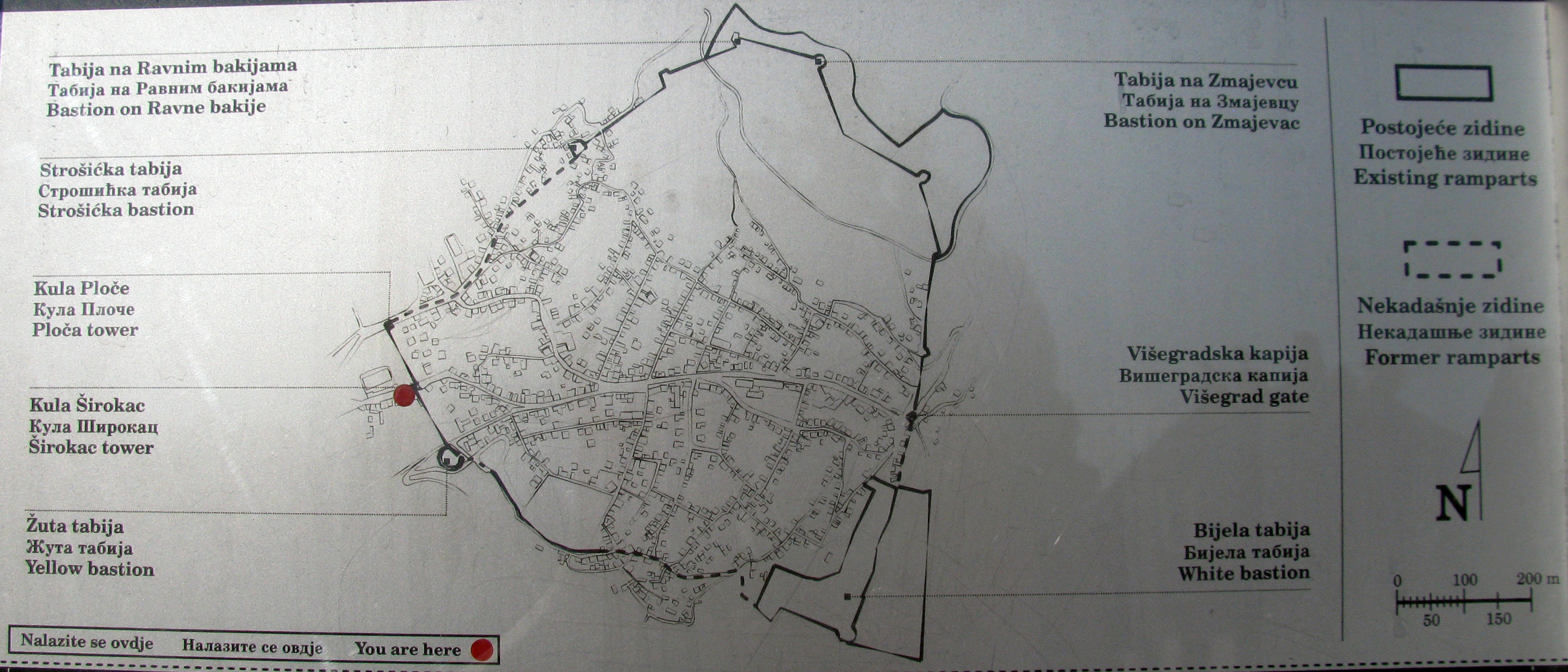
Map of the "Walled city of Vratnik".

=== Gates and Towers ===
==== Višegrad Gate ====
Višegradska kapija (transl. Visegrad Gate) was the main entry point to town and is one of the three city gate-towers in the Vratnik Old Town with the other two being Sirokac Tower and Ploca Tower. It was built between 1727 and 1739, in limestone and a special Bosnian stone "hreša" with roof shingles. Traffic went east via the main road towards Višegrad (thus the name) and continued further to the east towards Istanbul.

==== Širokac Gate and Tower ====
Kapija Širokac (transl. Širokac Gate) is one of the three gate-towers in the Vratnik Old Town. Širokac Gate, part of the reconstructed portion of the old defense walls of Vratnik town in Sarajevo.

==== Ploča Gate and Tower ====
Kapija Ploča (transl. Ploca Tower) is one of the three gate-towers in the Vratnik Old Town. The Alija Izetbegović Museum was opened on 19 October 2007 and is located in the Vratnik Kapija towers Ploča and Širokac. The museum is a commemoration to the influence and body of work of Alija Izetbegović, the first president of the Republic of Bosnia and Herzegovina. Visitors are able to walk from one tower to the next along the chemins de ronde.

=== Citadel, fort and bastions ===
Forts

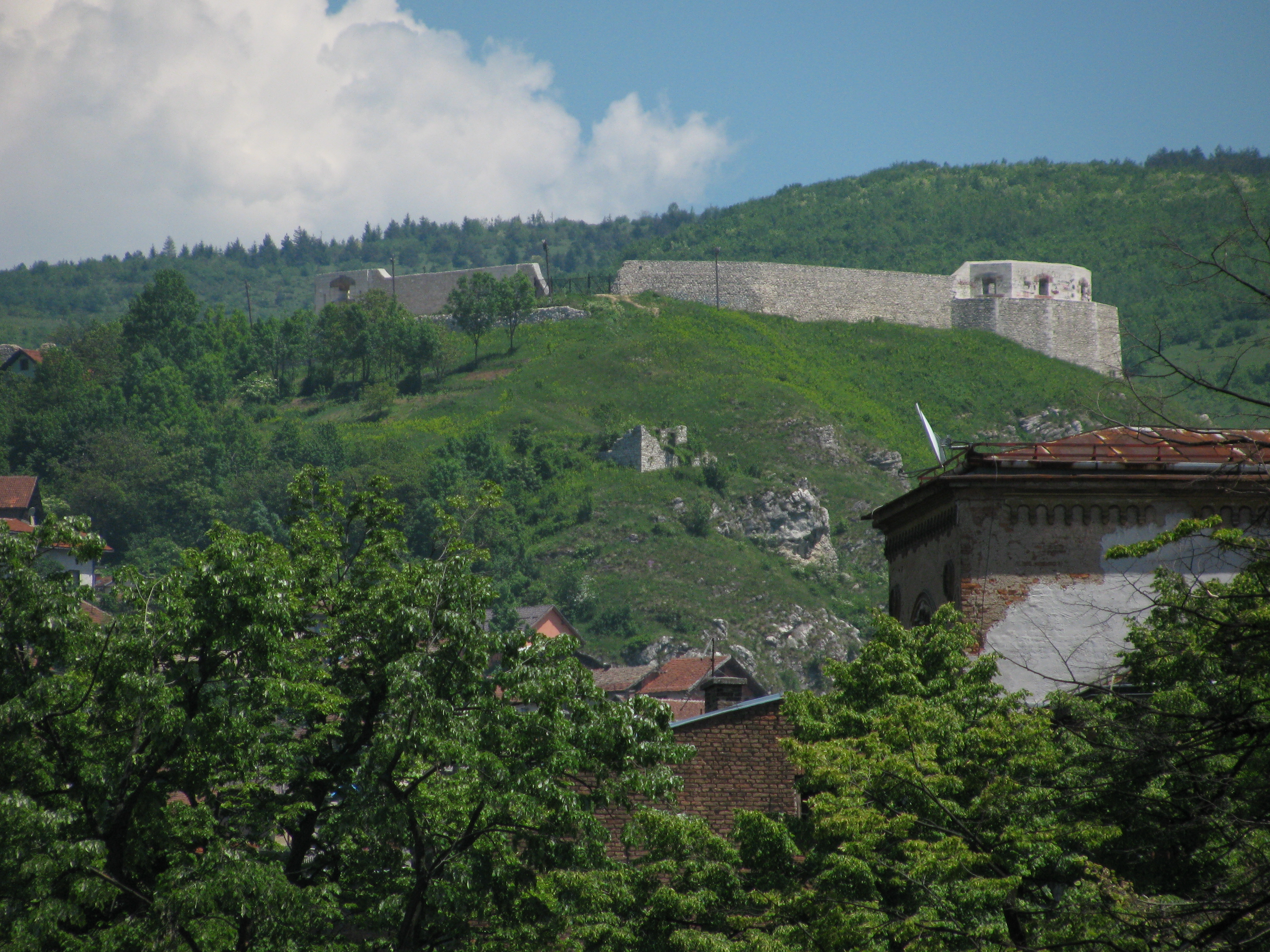
White Fortress from downtown Sarajevo

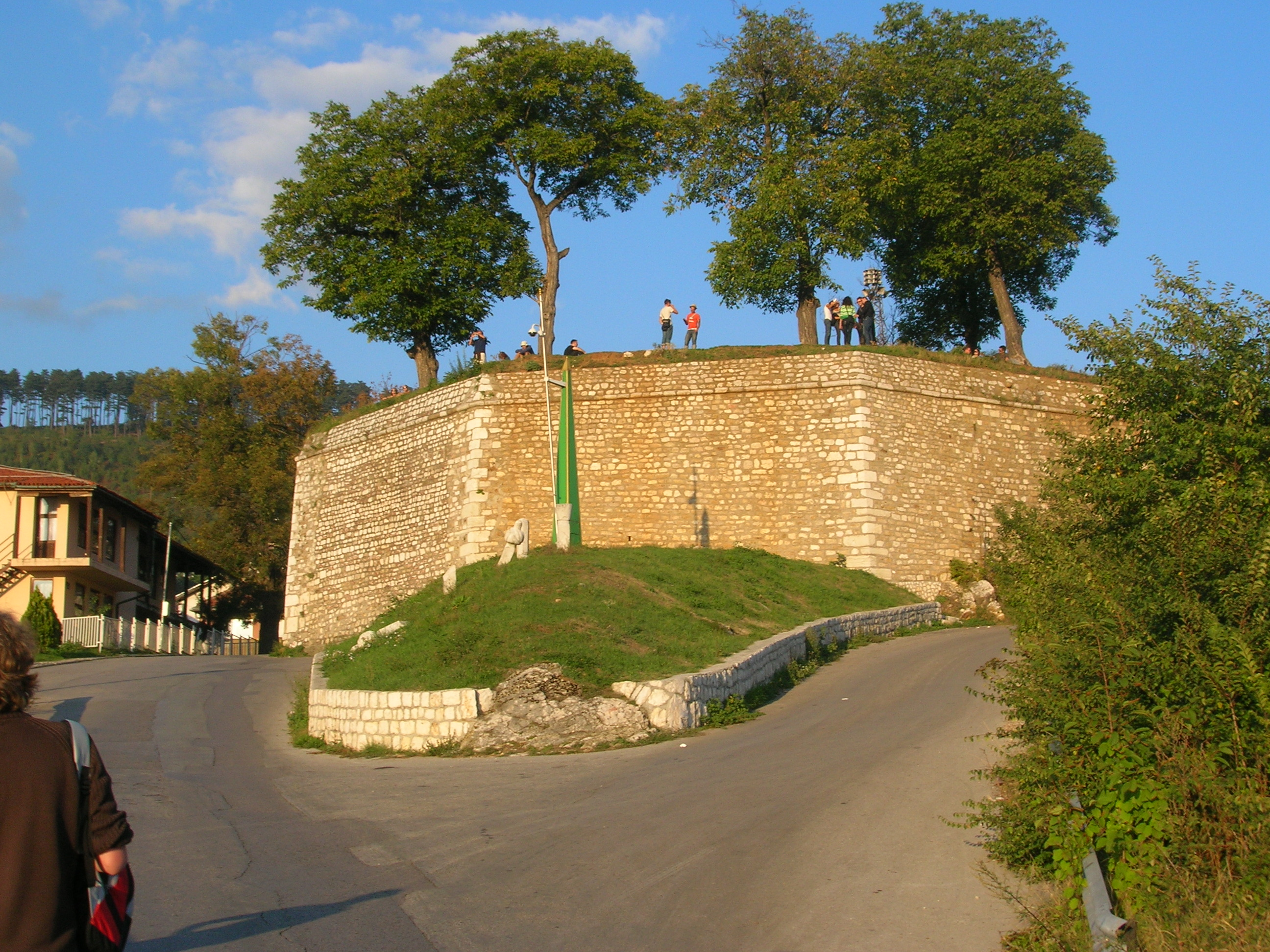
Yellow Fort

==== White Citadel ====
Bijela Tabija (transl. White Citadel) is a cannon bastion/fortress which also served to accommodate soldiers, and it is a part of the Old Town "Vratnik". It is assumed to have been built at the site of a small medieval town "Hodidjed" (central fortress of the Vrhbosna Parish). The fortress overlooks Sarajevo with the panoramic views of the eastern entrance to Sarajevo, the Miljacka River canyon and the city itself. The White Fortress was renovated and expanded several times. The present-day structure dates back to the Austro-Hungarian period. It served as a dungeon, barrack, munitions storage, a treasury, as well as the protection against the raid of Prince Eugene of Savoy in 1697, and defense fortress in battle against occupation by the Austro-Hungarian ruler in 1878. An esteemed local architect, Zlatko Ugljen has developed a conceptual reconstruction project. According to his idea where the site would be used as a theatre/music stage in the summer season. Some reports date the fortress to be built as far back as 1550.

==== Yellow Fort ====
Žuta Tabija (transl. Yellow Bastion; or Yellow Fort) is a cannon fort at Jekovac. It was built close to the Jajce Barracks and the Jekovac water reservoir. It served as one of the defense points against the Austro-Hungarian troops in 1878. The fortress was damaged and rebuilt several times. The most recent renovation took place in 1998.

==== Strošićki Bastion ====
Strošićka Tabija (transl. Strošićki Bastion) is located on the northwestern part of the Vratnik fort. Essentially the shape is trapezium, with the surface of 367m². Two parallel sides are 25 meters long and 14m, and the other two 18m and 21 meters. Strošićka bastion was built on steep terrain, and the preserved height of the walls on the northeastern side is 3m, and on the north 8m.

==== Bastion on Ravne Bakije ====
Tabija na Ravnim Bakijama (transl. Bastion on Ravne Bakije) is located in the far northern part of the fort, and the area is not easily accessible.

==== Bastion on Zmajevac ====
Tabija na Zmajevcu (transl. Bastion on Zmajevac) is also located in the far northern part of the fort, and the area is not easily accessible.

=== Jajce barracks main building ===
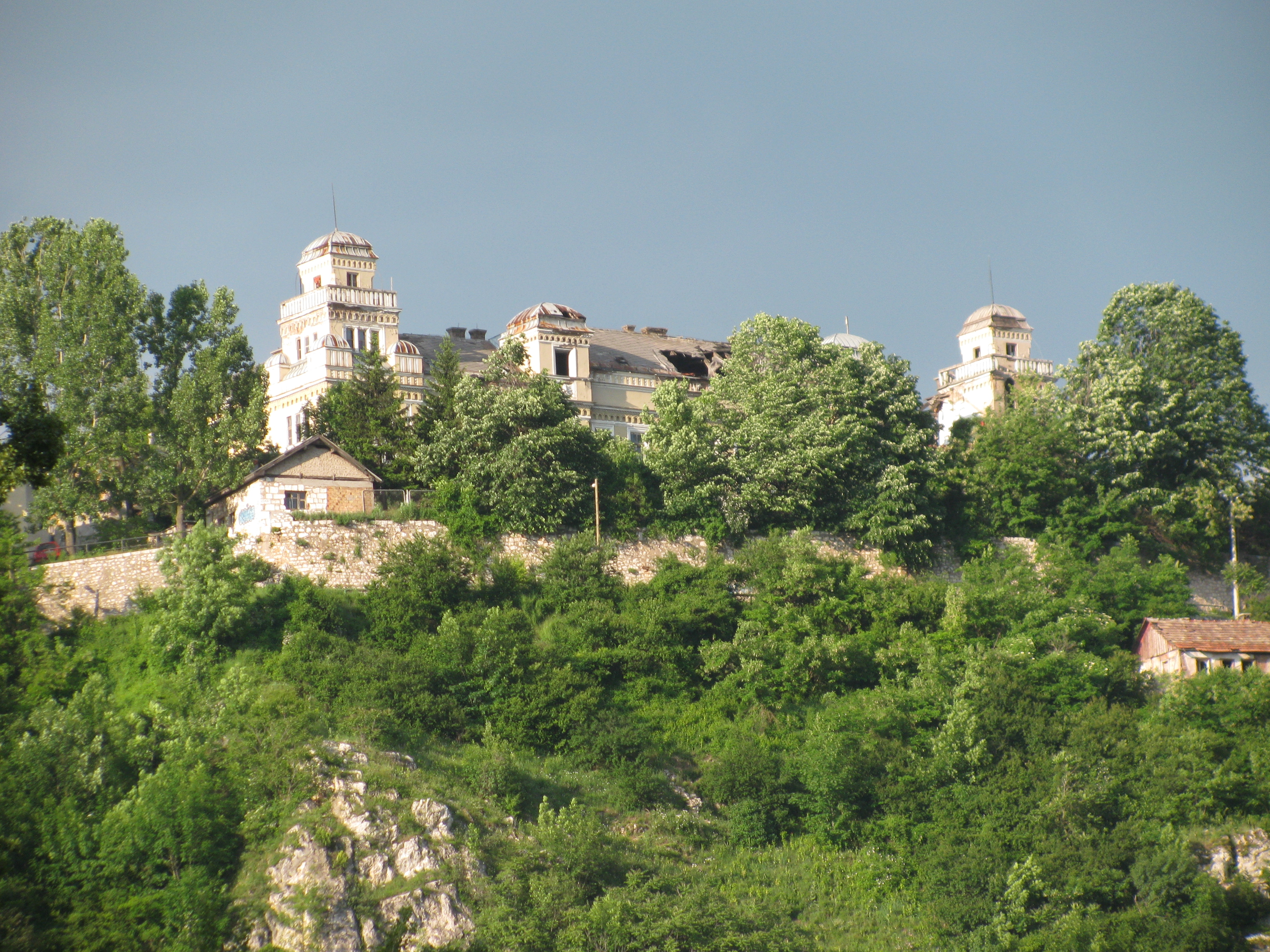
Jajce barracks

Jajce kasarna (transl. Jajce barracks) is the name of the former Eugene of Savoy barracks in Sarajevo. Barracks were built in 1914 for the need of the Austro-Hungarian army, and name "Jajce Barracks" carries from 1915 when one Austro-Hungarian military hospital was moved to the Barracks.

== Heritage designation and protection ==
The Walled city of Vratnik, with its perimeter walls, fortresses, watchtowers, city gates, and old Bosnian architecture, is designated as the Old Vratnik Fort, the architectural ensemble a national monument of Bosnia and Herzegovina by KONS in 2005.

== See also ==
- Walled city of Jajce
- Walled town of Počitelj
