= Walled town of Počitelj =

Walled town of Počitelj Почитељ
- Historic town
- The historic urban site of Počitelj
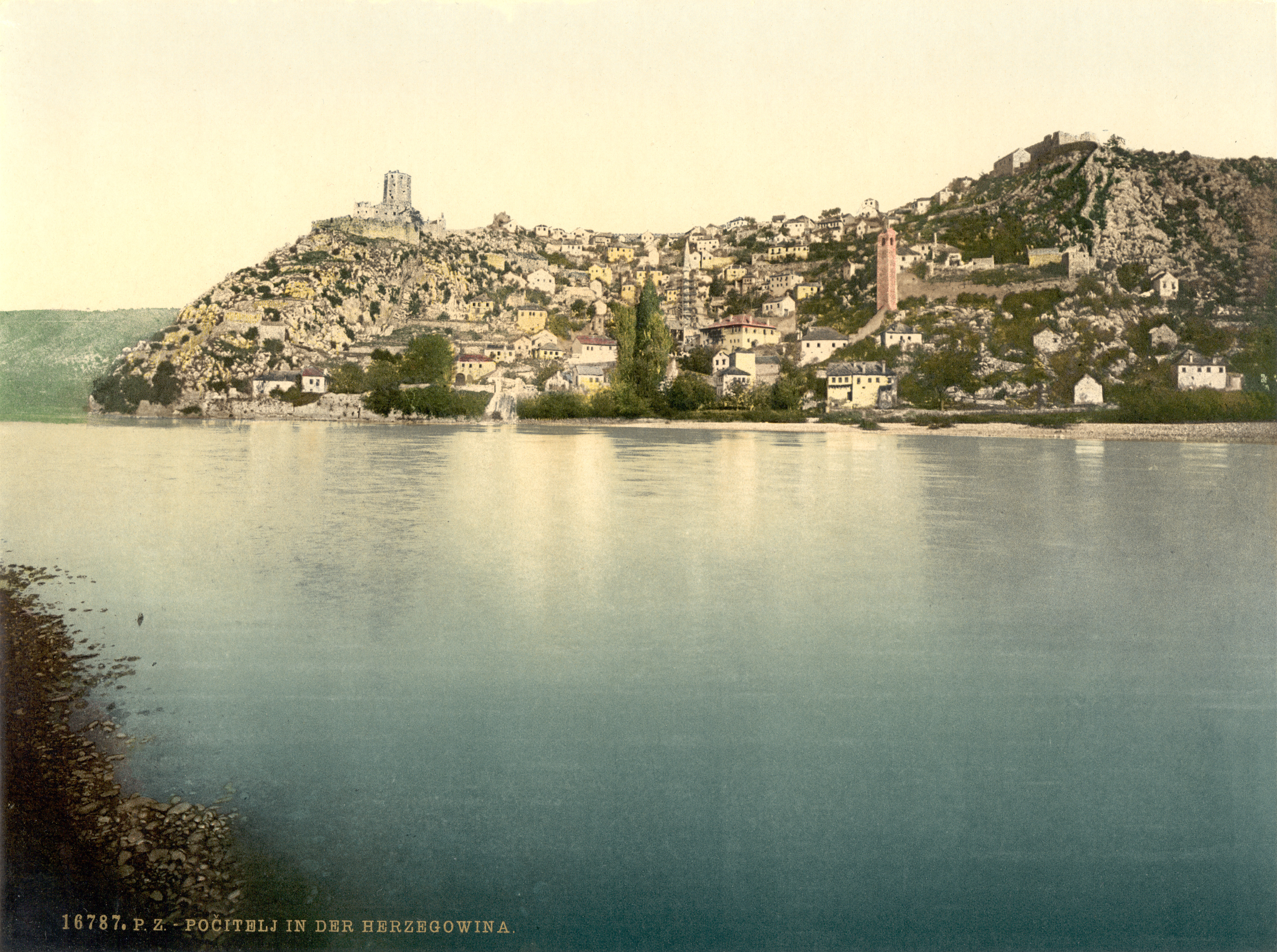
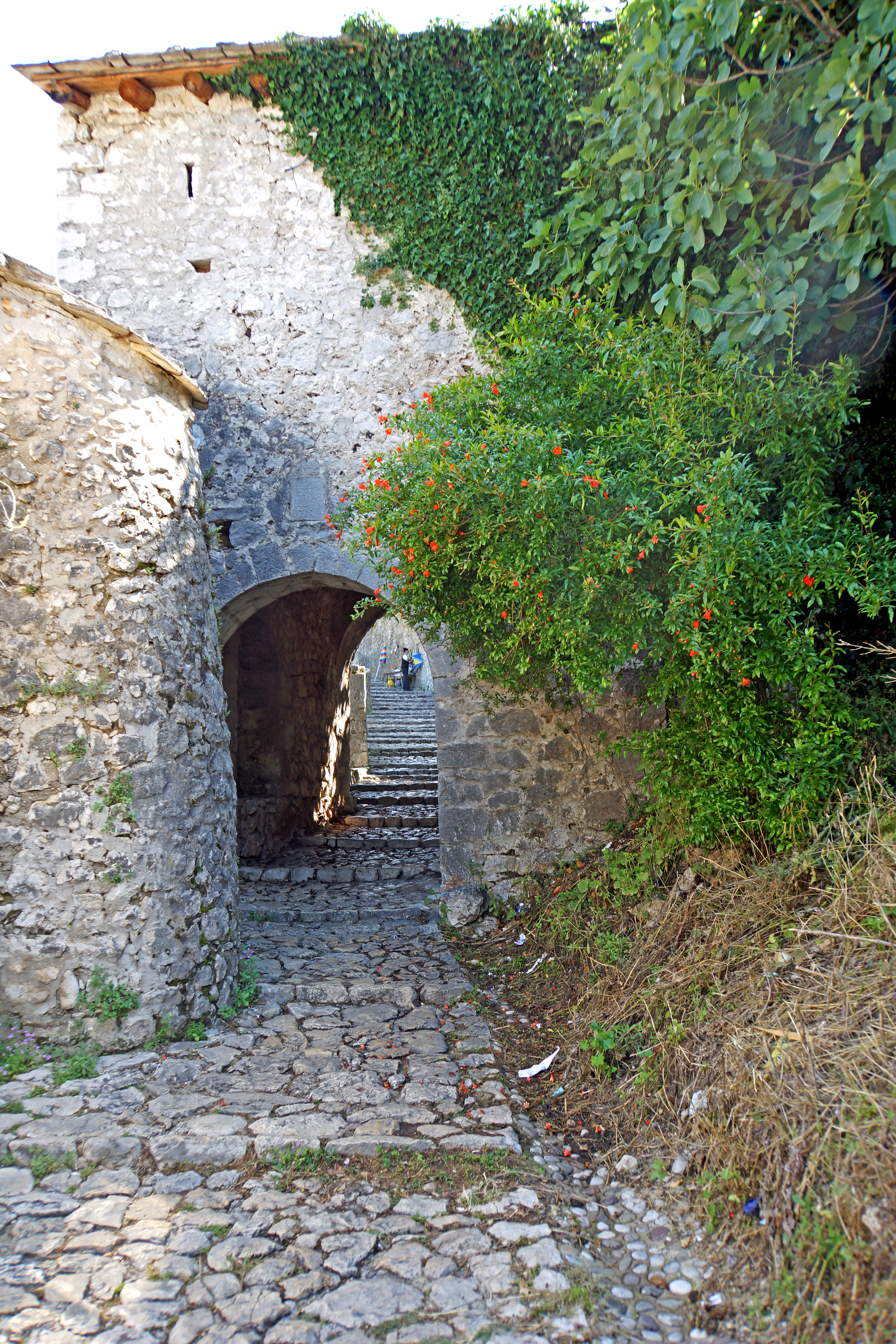
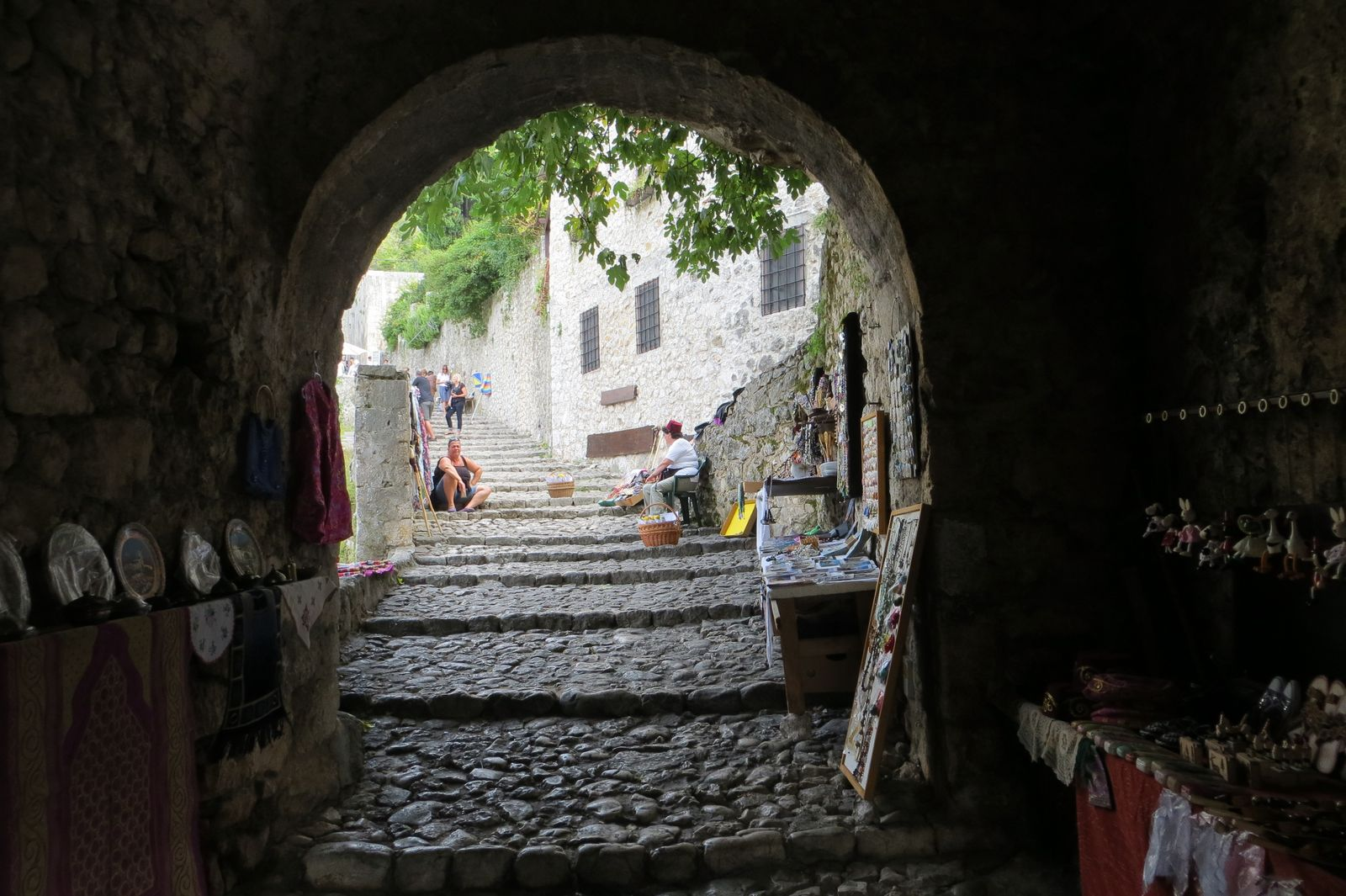
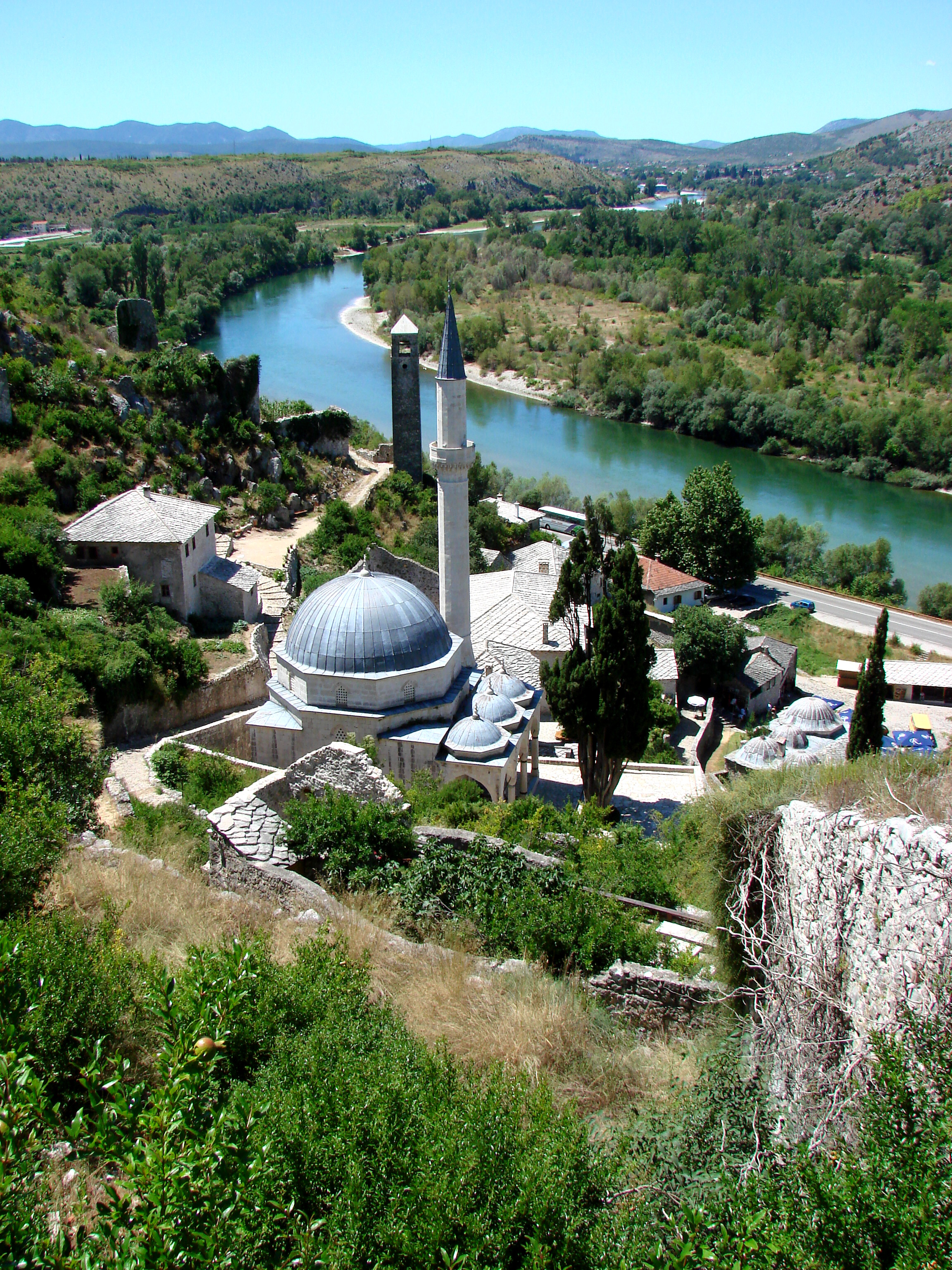
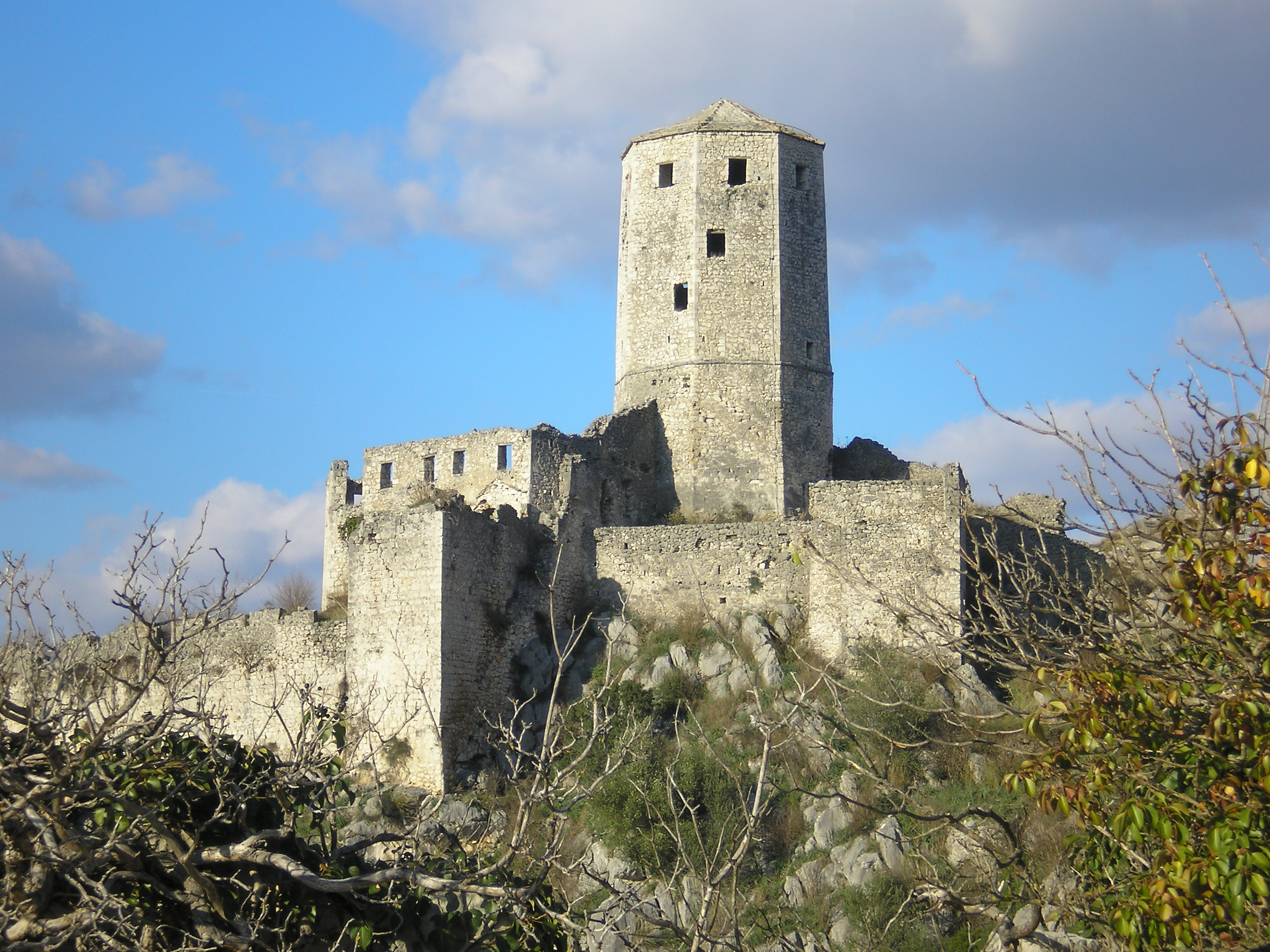
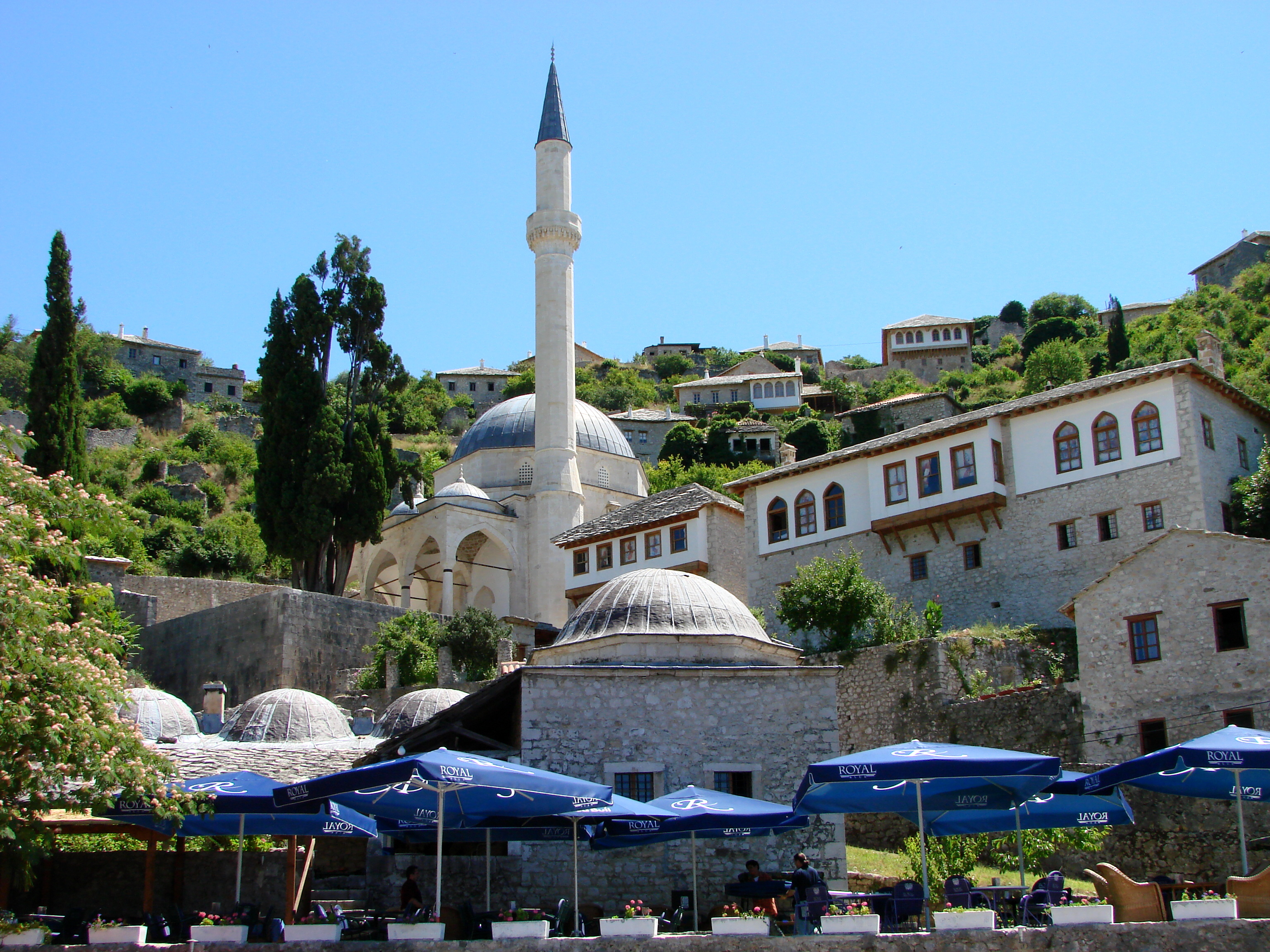
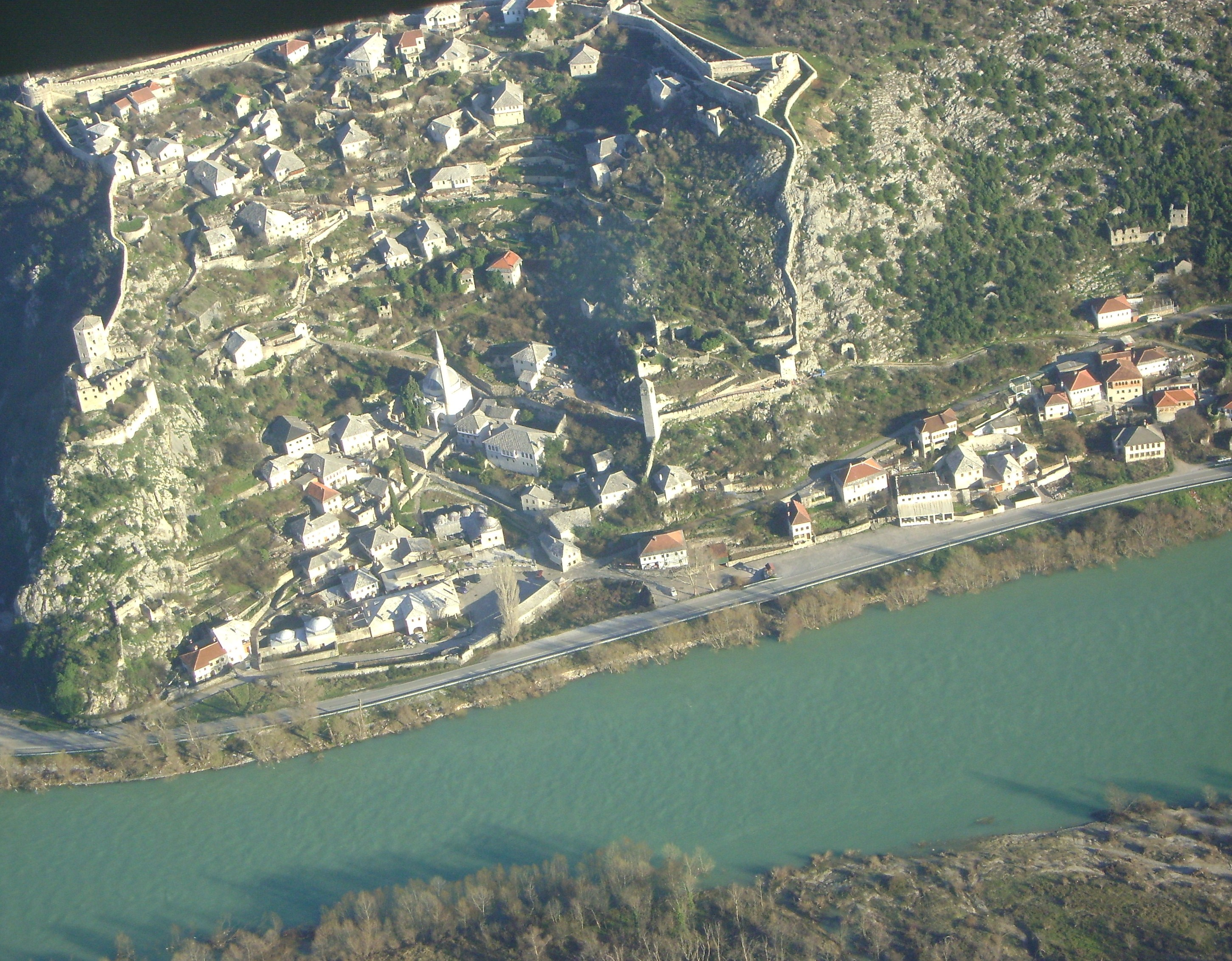
- Interactive map of Walled town of Počitelj
- Location within Bosnia and Herzegovina
- Coordinates: 43.134499224896615°N 17.732638787887268°E
- Country: Bosnia and Herzegovina
- Entity: Federation of Bosnia and Herzegovina
- Canton: Herzegovina-Neretva
- Municipality: Čapljina

Area
  - Total: 6.97 km^{2} (2.69 sq mi)

Population (2013)
  - Total: 799
  - Density: 115/km^{2} (297/sq mi)
- Time zone: UTC+1 (CET)
  - Summer (DST): UTC+2 (CEST)

KONS of Bosnia and Herzegovina
- Official name: Počitelj, the historic urban site
- Type: historic urban site
- Criteria: II. Value; A, B, C iii.iv., D ii.iv., E i.ii.iii.iv.v., F i.ii.iii., G i.ii.iii.iv.v.vi.vii, H i.ii., I i.ii.iii.
- Designated: 21 January 2003 (?th session)
- Reference no.: 780
- Decision no.: 01-278/02
- Operator: -

Walled town of Počitelj (Serbian Cyrillic: Почитељ) is a medieval fortified nucleus of Počitelj historic village, in the municipality of Čapljina, Bosnia and Herzegovina. Due to its significant architectural and urbanistic historical value, it is considered an open-air museum.

The Walled town is nested in a natural karst amphitheater along the left bank of the Neretva river, on the main road Mostar-Metković. The walled nucleus is protected as a National Monument of Bosnia and Herzegovina. The architectural ensemble of Počitelj is also proposed as such for inscription into the UNESCO's list of World Heritage Sites. The bid for inscription is currently placed on the UNESCO Tentative list.

== Historic background ==
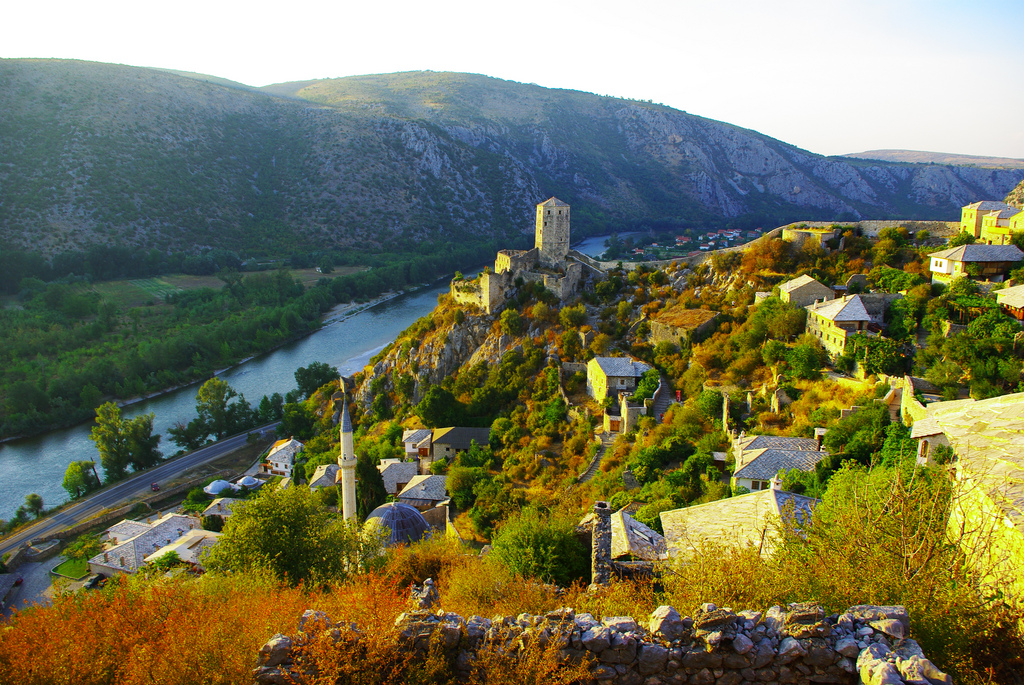
Overlooking the Lower Neretva valley and Počitelj nestled on the left bank from the donjon Pašina Tabija

The earliest mention of Počitelj dates back to 1444 and 1448, in charters issued by king Alfonso V and Friedrich III, Holy Roman Emperor. However, although the exact date can't be pinpointed, it is likely that the fortified town along with its complementary settlements was built by Bosnian king Tvrtko I sometime in 1383.

The fortress, that will become the Počitelj's citadel, was first to be built, and it was done by King Tvrtko I of Bosnia in 1383. Its role was to control a merchant route, through the valley of the Neretva, from the Adriatic sea coast, via Drijeva trg, further to Bosnian inland.

The Ottoman Empire extended fortifications greatly, and developed a settlement, with a housing, bath, and the mosque. The main tower of Počitelj citadel, Gavran-captain tower (Bosnian: Gavran-kapetanova kula), is erected on a karstic rock hanging high above the Neretva river. Today, it overlooks the historic walled town of Počitelj.

== Geography ==
It is located in the municipality of Čapljina, in the Herzegovina-Neretva Canton of the Federation of Bosnia and Herzegovina. The Walled town is nested in a natural karst amphitheater along the left bank of the Neretva river, facing west, on the main road Mostar-Metković. It is about 30 kilometres (19 mi) to the south of Mostar and about 3 kilometres (1.9 mi) northeast from the center of Čapljina.

== Description and protection of architectural ensemble ==
Due to its significant architectural and urbanistic historical value, it is considered an open-air museum.

=== Citadel ===
Base plan for the citadel

The Počitelj Citadel with a silo-shaped Tower (Serbo-Croatian: Kula), overlooking the town and its surroundings from the top of the steep cliff above town, is located on the northern corner of the town wall. It used to house watchmen and military, guarding against intrusions.

=== Gavrankapetanović House ===
The Gavrankapetanović House is built at the end of the 16th century, it was named after and housed the captains of Počitelj, who belonged to the Gavrankapetanović family. It is typical example of the residential architecture of the village. It is the only house in town to have separate rooms for men and women. The house became the residence of an artists' colony between 1961 and 1975, one of which was the Italian painter Vittorio Miele. This was the longest operating artist colony in Southeast Europe. During the Bosnian war, the house was set on fire. It was restored in its original state in 2003.

=== Šišman Ibrahim Pasha Mosque ===
The most representative building within the walls is Šišman Ibrahim Pasha Mosque (Serbo-Croatian: Šišman Ibrahim-pašina džamija) or Hajji Alija Mosque, built in 1563 by Hajji-Alija, son of Musa. It was repaired in the 17th century by Šišman Ibrahim Pasha. The locals gave the mosque afterwards pasha's name. The domed mosque is notable for its special acoustics. The mosque was restored in the 1970s, but badly damaged during the Bosnian War in 1993. It was restored again in 2002.

=== Sahat Kula ===
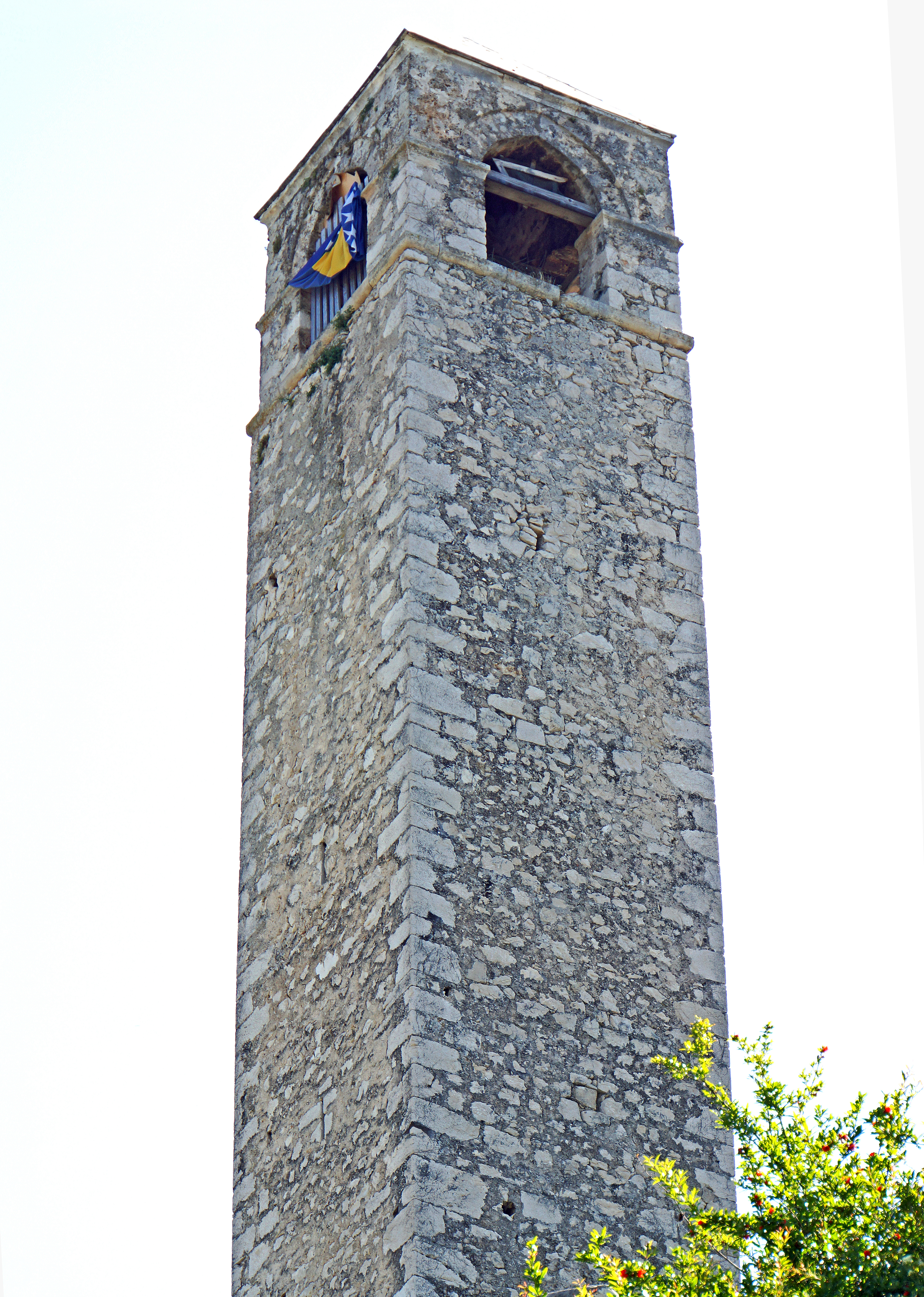
Počitelj Clock Tower

The Sahat Kula (transl. Clock tower), is located closer to the river and toward the southern walls of the town.

=== Significance ===
Počitelj represents one of the few urban ensembles in Bosnia and Herzegovina that were preserved in their integrity to the present times. It was also developed through the several phases of the history beginning with the medieval period. Its significant strategic role from the 13th to 17th century gave its inhabitants the power to build one of the most important, and best preserved ensembles within the city walls in the region. The town can be compared with some of the noted world heritage sites as the old towns of Mostar (Bosnia and Herzegovina), Ohrid (North Macedonia), Safranbolu (Turkey), Gjirokastër (Albania). Počitelj's layout and use of building materials put it into the group of Ottoman-Mediterranean types of small settlements. The architectural ensemble of Počitelj is proposed as such for inscription into the UNESCO's list of World Heritage Sites. The bid for inscription is currently placed on the UNESCO Tentative list.

== History ==
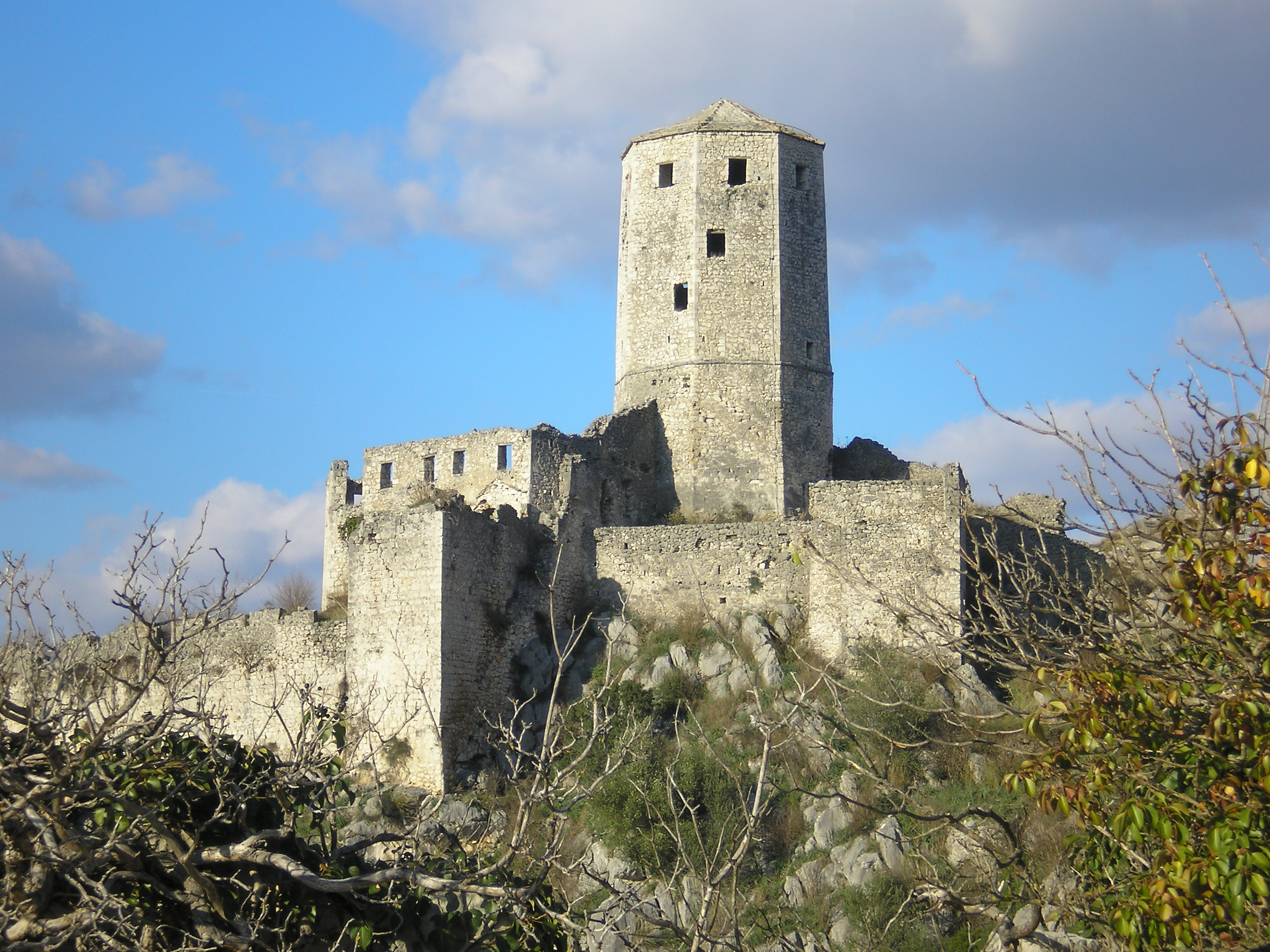
Citadel, built and extended over time

The earliest mention of or recorded reference to Počitelj is in charters of king Alfonso V and Fridrich III from 1444 to 1448. However, the village most likely predates these documents. The exact date can't be pinpointed but it is likely that fortified town along with its complementary settlements was built by Bosnian king Tvrtko I sometime in 1383. Počitelj was considered the administrative center and center of governance of Župa Dubrava (county), while its westernmost point gave it major strategic importance. The fortress and its podgrađe during this time was under control of Kosača noble family, whose chieftain Stjepan Vukčić and his hair Vlatko Hercegović During the years following Ottoman conquest of Bosnian realm, between 1464 and 1471, the town was fortified by Vladislav Herzegović with a support of Dubrovnik, king Matthias Corvinus of Hungary and the Pope. From this point the walled town of Počitelj evolved in the period from the 16th to the 18th centuries. Architecturally, the stone-constructed parts of the town are a fortified complex, in which two stages of evolution are evident: medieval, and Ottoman.

In the period between 1463–1471 the town housed a Hungarian garrison and was fortified into a strategic defense stronghold. In 1471, following a brief siege, the town was conquered by the Ottomans. It lost its strategic significance. It remained within the Ottoman Empire until 1878. From 1782 to 1879 Počitelj was the seat of akadiluk (area under the jurisdiction of a qadi, or judge) and the centre of the Počitelj military district from 1713 to 1835.

The town's layout and appearance, as well as its importance has altered during the course of its history. Three significant periods can be distinguished in the development of Počitelj:

1. The period of the Hungarian King Matthias Corvinus during which the town had a major strategic importance (1463–1471)
2. The period of the settlement development under the Ottoman Empire with the erection of public buildings: mosques, imaret, maktab, madrasa, hammam, han and the clock-tower (1471–1698).
3. The period after the Venetians conquered and destroyed Gabela (1698–1878), the main Ottoman fortification facing Dalmatia, and recovery of Počitelj's strategic importance.

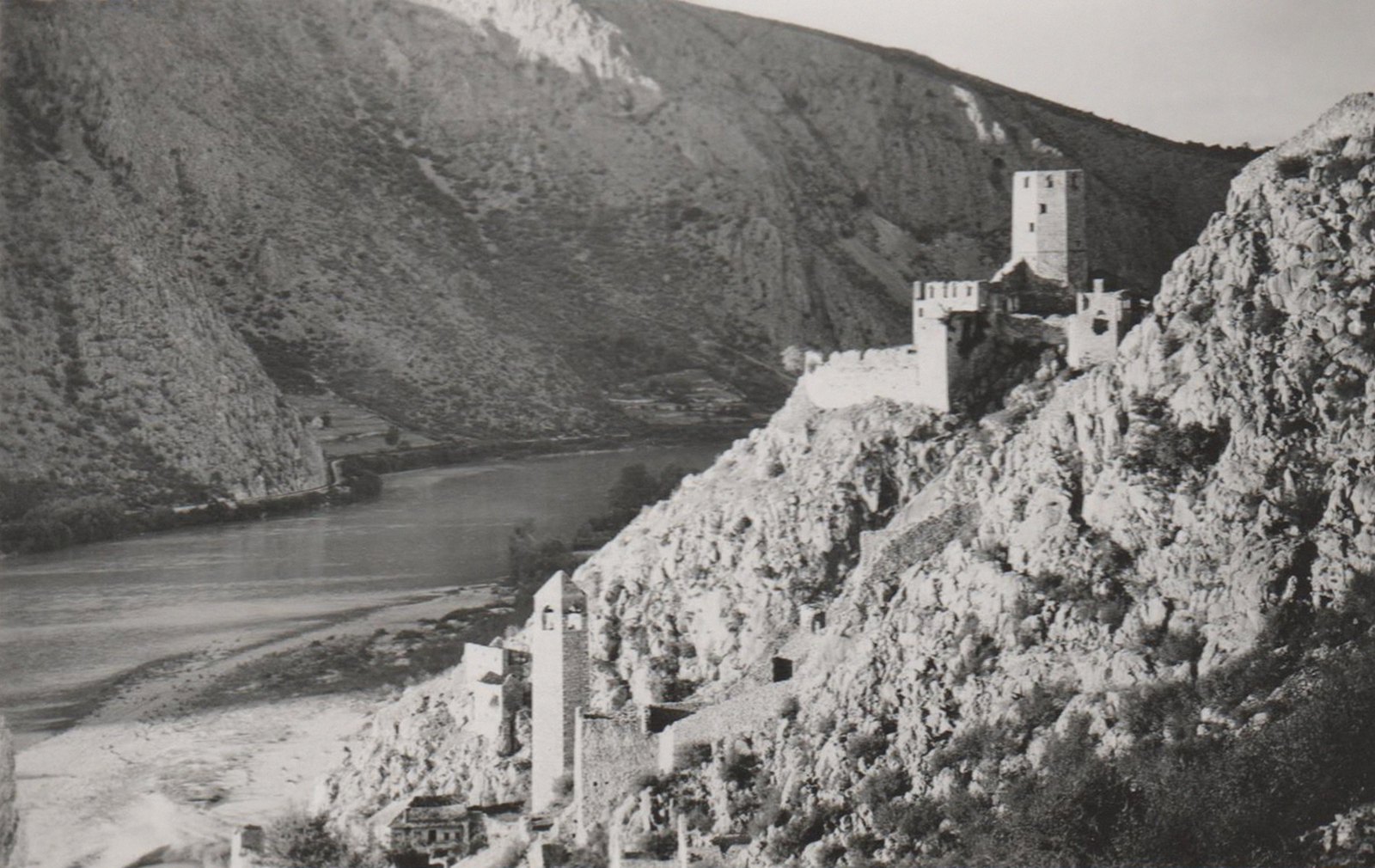
Pocitelj, photo from Austro-Hungarian period

After the establishment of Austro-Hungarian rule in Bosnia and Herzegovina in 1878, Počitelj lost its strategic importance and started deteriorating rapidly. The population declined gradually. The loss of the town's strategic role assisted in the preservation of the original urban architectural ensemble, so that the town remained in its original form to present day.

The entire historic urban site of Počitelj and surrounding area suffered extensive collateral damage during the 1992–1995 war in Bosnia and Herzegovina. Namely, it was heavily damaged by Croatian forces during the 1993 Bosnian War. Following the bombing, Počitelj's sixteenth-century master works of Islamic art and architecture were destroyed and a large part of the town's population was displaced.

As proposed by the University of York, United Kingdom, and the University of Sarajevo, Počitelj was in 1996 named by the World Monuments Watch as one of the world's 100 most endangered cultural heritage sites. In the year 2000 the Federation of Bosnia and Herzegovina Government initiated the Programme of the permanent protection of Počitelj. The programme includes the protection of cultural heritage from deterioration, restoration of damaged and destroyed buildings, encouraging the return of the refugees and displaced persons to their homes and the long-term protection and revitalization of the Počitelj's historic urban area. The Programme is on-going.

As of 2008, the International Council on Monuments and Sites (ICOMOS) expressed concern over the proposed construction of a nearby highway, Corridor Vc. Initial plans include a 1,000-meter long, 100-meter high bridge over the Neretva river. It is feared that the construction will result in a “physical, visual and ecological degradation and devastation of this cultural and historical unity and its authentic surroundings.” While a new potential location for the bridge crossing is being investigated, non-controversial sections are under construction.

== Gallery ==
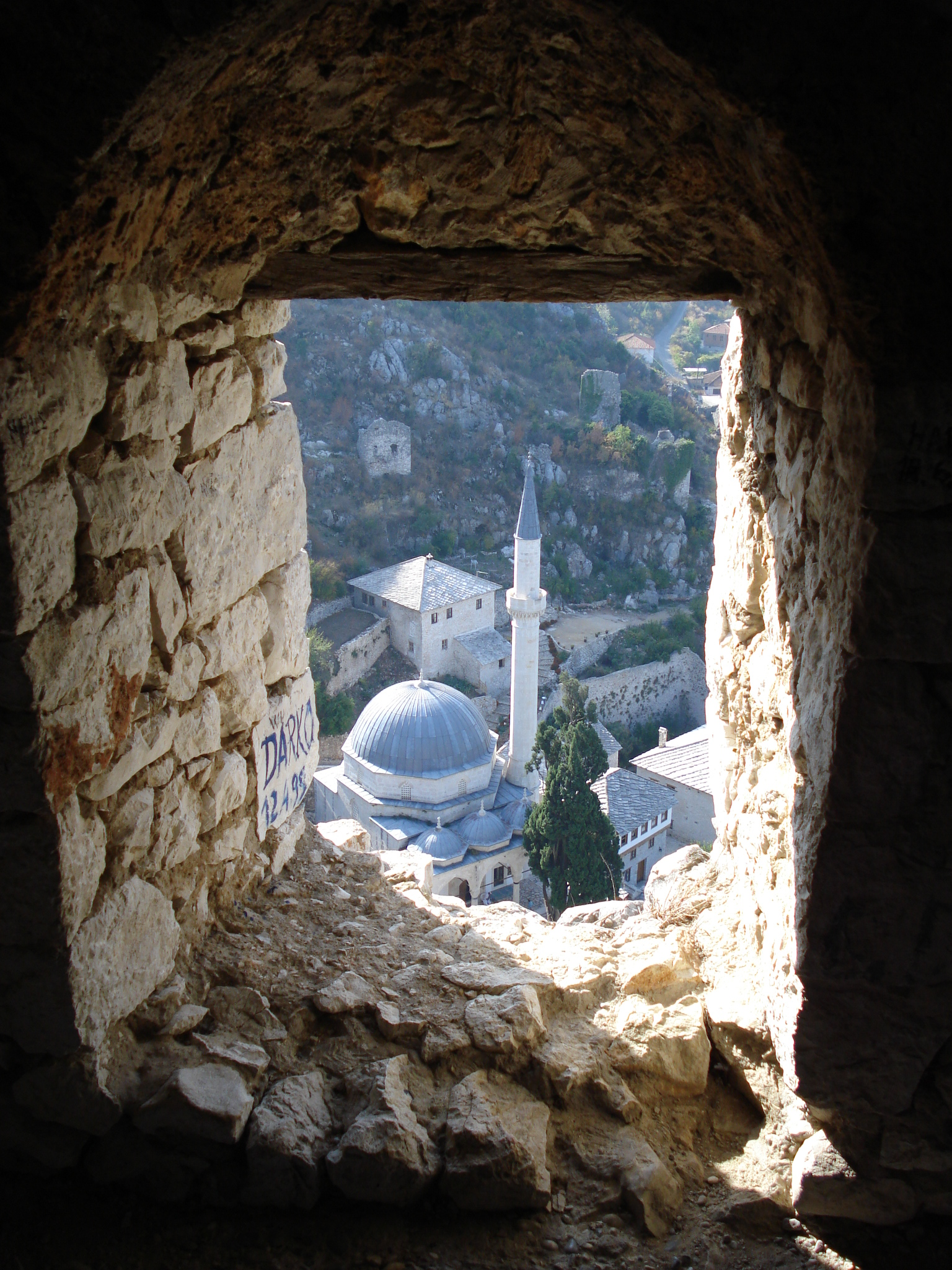
A view of the mosque from the citadel, October 2007

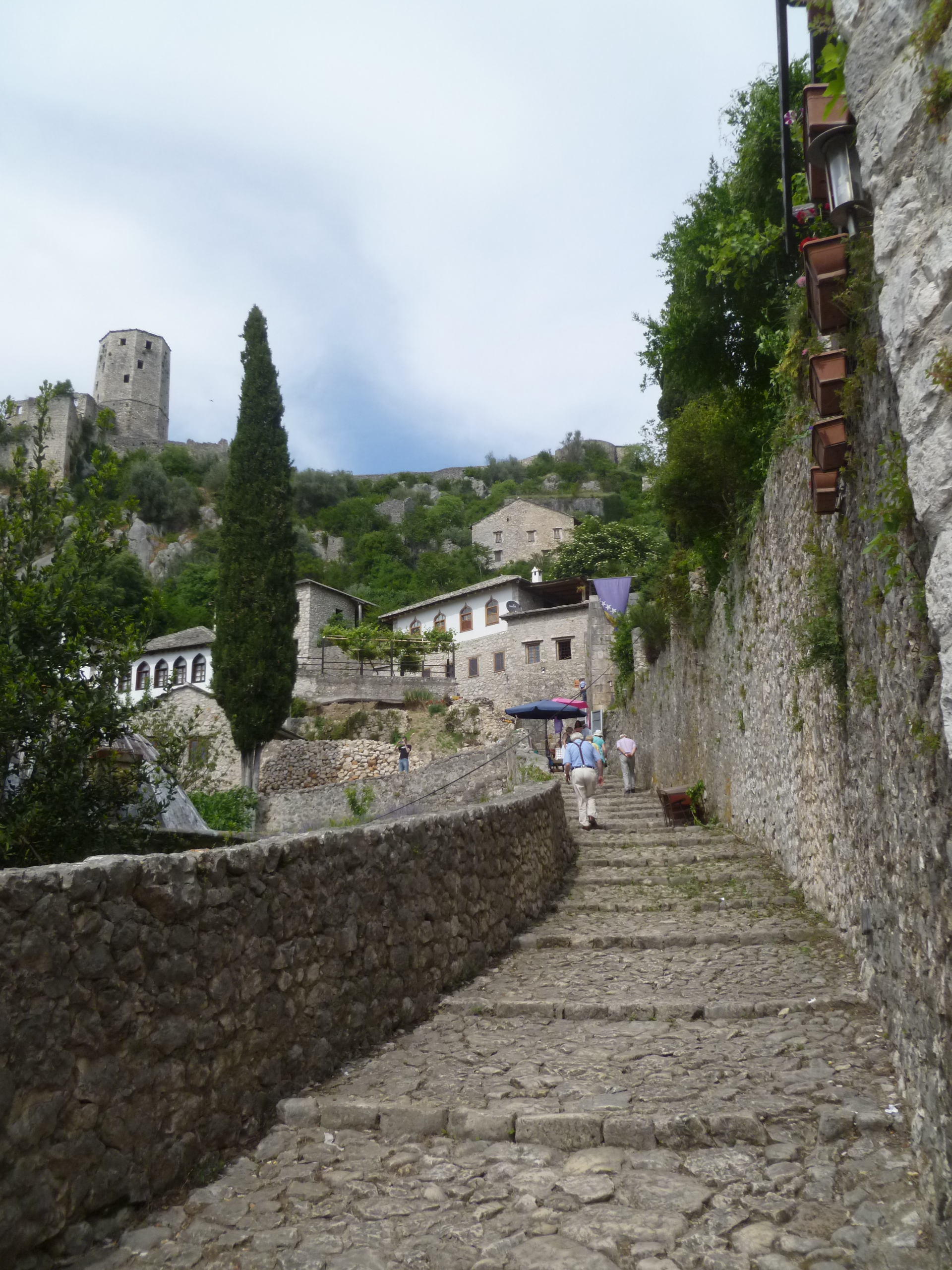
Through the streets of Počitelj

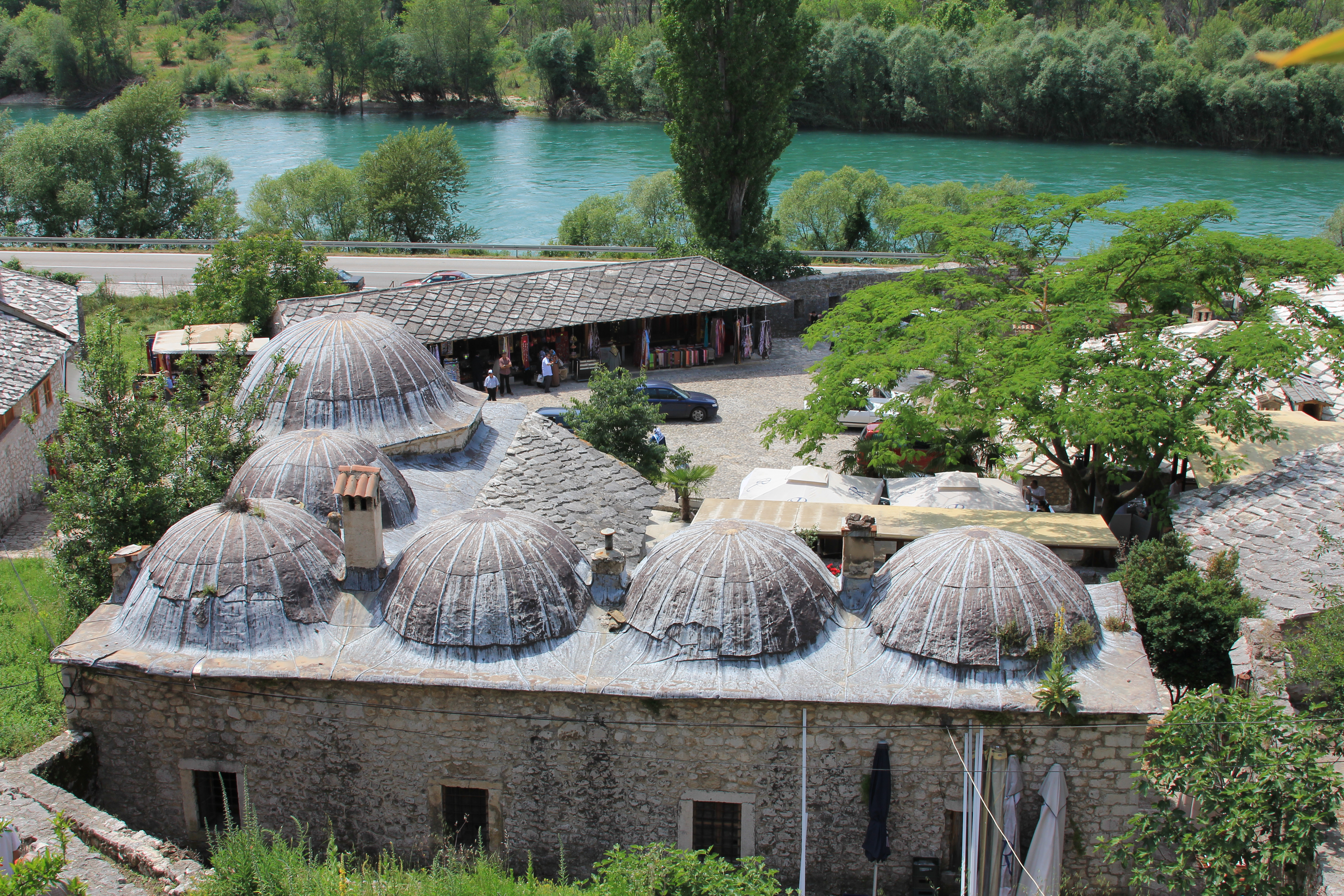
Hamam - bath (A view from above)

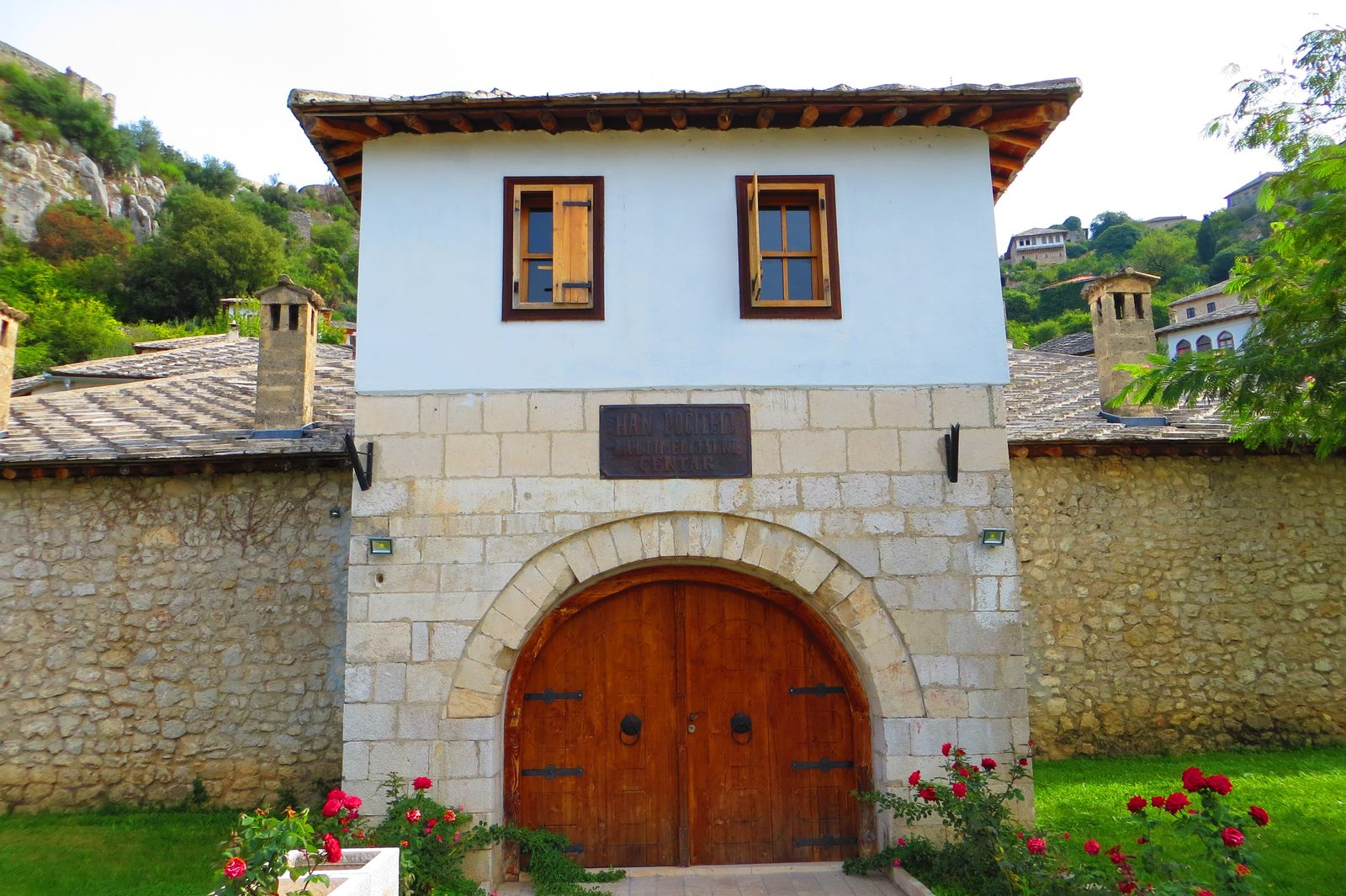
Entrance into han, today multimedia center

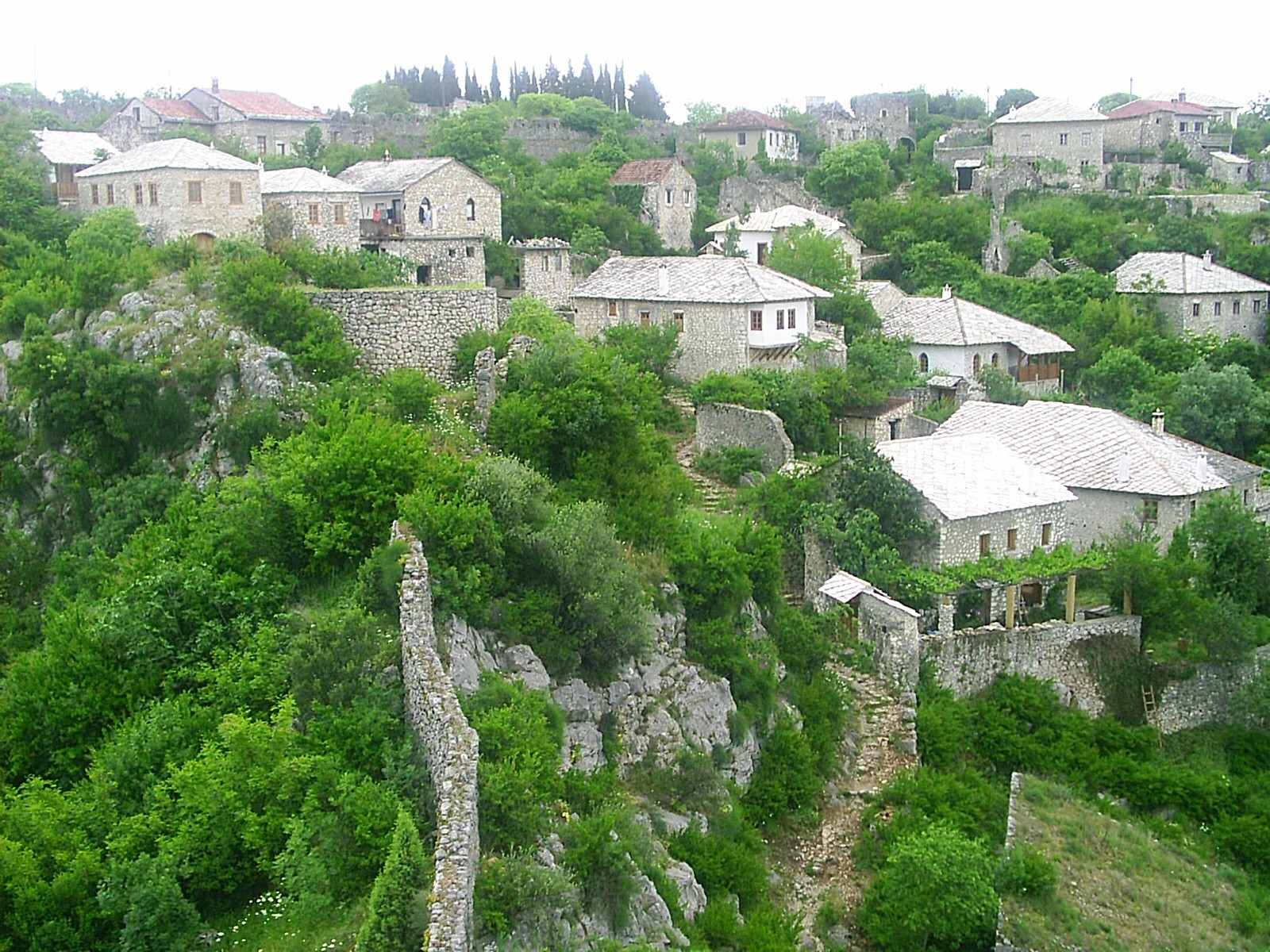
Typical houses with gardens

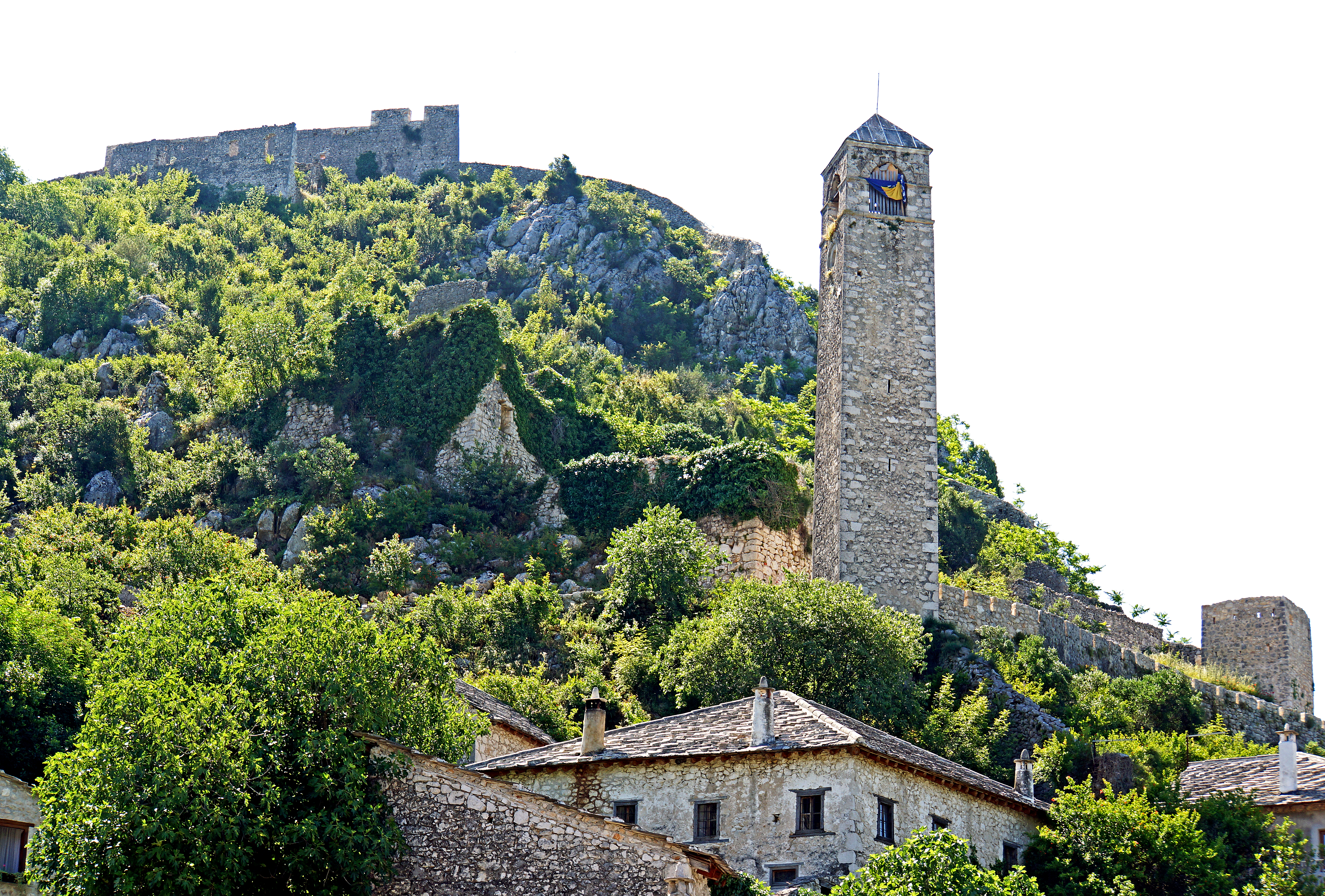
Sahat-kula (clock-tower)

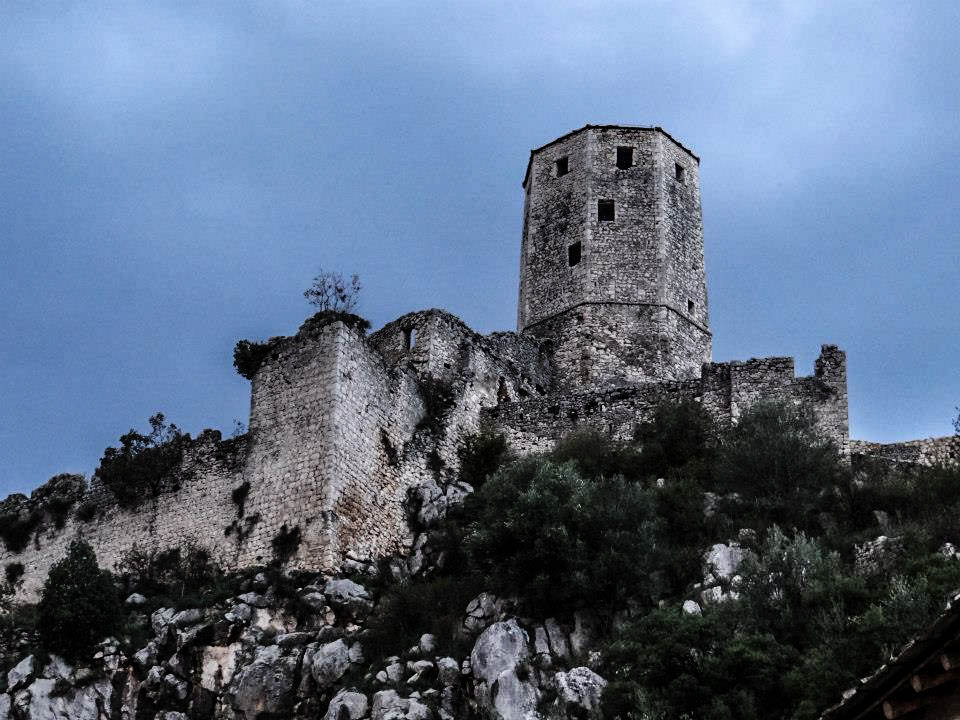
Citadel of Počitelj

== See also ==
- Walled city of Jajce
- Walled city of Vratnik
