= List of populated places in Bosnia and Herzegovina =

This is a complete list of settlements in Bosnia and Herzegovina.

== City of Sarajevo ==
=== Sarajevo – Centar ===
Mrkovići • Nahorevo • Poljine • Radava • Sarajevo (part of settlement) • Vića

=== Sarajevo – Ilidža (FBiH) ===
Buhotina • Gornje Mladice • Jasen • Kakrinje • Kasindo • Kobiljača • Krupac • Rakovica • Rudnik • Sarajevo (part of settlement) • Vela • Vlakovo • Zenik • Zoranovići

=== Sarajevo – Novi Grad (FBiH) ===
Bojnik • Rječica • Otoka • Buča potok • Boljakov potok • Briješće • Rajlovac • Reljevo dom • Halilovići • Alipašino polje • Dobrinja • Neđarići • Švrakino selo • Mojmilo • Saraj polje • Sokolje • Aerodromsko naselje • Aneks • Sarajevo (part of settlement)

=== Sarajevo – Novo Sarajevo ===
Klek • Kozarevići • Lukavica • Miljevići • Petrovići • Sarajevo (part of settlement) • Toplik • Tvrdimići

=== Sarajevo – Stari Grad (FBiH) ===
Barice • Blizanci • Bulozi • Donje Biosko • Donje Međuše • Dovlići • Faletići • Gornje Biosko • Gornje Međuše • Hreša • Kumane • Močioci • Njemanica • Sarajevo (part of settlement) • Studenkovići • Vučja Luka

=== Hadžići ===
Bare • Beganovi • Binježevo • Budmolići • Buturovići kod Drozgometve • Buturovići kod Osenika • Crepljani • Češće • Čičke • Deovići • Do • Doljani • Donja Bioča • Donja Raštelica • Donji Hadžići • Donji Zovik • Dragovići • Drozgometva • Dub • Dupovci • Duranovići • Ferhatlije • Garovci • Gornja Bioča • Gornja Raštelica • Gornji Zovik • Gradac • Grivići • Grude • Hadžići • Japalaci • Jeleč • Karaosmanovići • Kasatići • Kazina Bara • Korča • Košćan • Kućice • Lihovci • Lokve • Luke • Ljubovčići • Medvjedice • Miševići • Mokrine • Odžak • Orahovica • Osenik • Pazarić • Ramići • Resnik • Sejdanovići • Smucka • Tarčin • Trnčići • Trzanj • Urduk • Ušivak • Vrančići • Vrbanja • Vukovići • Žunovica

=== Ilijaš ===
Balibegovići • Banjer • Bokšići • Buljetovina • Čemernica • Četojevići • Donja Bioča • Donja Misoča • Donje Selo • Donji Čevljanovići • Dragoradi • Draževići • Duboki Potok • Duševine • Gajevi • Gajine • Gojanovići • Gornja Bioča • Gornja Misoča • Gornji Čevljanovići • Hadžići • Han Karaula • Han Šići • Homar • Ilijaš • Ivančići • Kadarići • Kamenica • Karaula • Korita • Košare • Kožlje • Krčevine • Krivajevići • Kunosići • Lađevići • Lipnik • Luka • Luka kod Stublina • Lješevo • Ljubina • Ljubnići • Malešići • Medojevići • Moševići • Mrakovo • Nišići • Odžak • Ozren • Podlipnik • Podlugovi • Popovići • Rakova Noga • Ribarići • Rudnik Čevljanovići • Sirovine • Solakovići • Sovrle • Srednje • Stomorine • Stubline • Sudići • Šabanci • Šljeme • Taračin Do • Velika Njiva • Vidotina • Vilić • Visojevica • Višnjica • Vladojevići • Vlaškovo • Vrutci • Vukasovići • Vuknići • Zakutnica • Zlotege

=== Pale ===
Bjelogorci • Bljuštevac • Bogovići • Brdarići • Brdo • Brezovice • Brnjica • Brojnići • Buđ • Čeljadinići • Čemernica • Ćemanovići • Datelji • Donja Ljubogošta • Donja Vinča • Gluhovići • Gornja Ljubogošta • Gornja Vinča • Gornje Pale • Gornji Pribanj • Gorovići • Gradac • Gute • Hotočina • Jahorina • Jasik • Jelovci • Kadino Selo • Kamenica • Kasidoli • Komrani • Kosmaj • Kostreša • Kračule • Luke • Miošići • Modrik • Mokro • Nehorići • Pale • Pavlovac • Petovići • Podgrab • Podloznik • Podmedenik • Podvitez • Ponor • Prača • Prutine • Pustopolje • Radonjići • Rakite • Rakovac • Renovica • Rogoušići • Rosulje • Saice • Sinjevo • Sjetlina • Srednje • Stajna • Stambolčić • Strane • Sumbulovac • Šainovići • Šip • Turkovići • Udež • Vinograd • Vlahovići

=== Trnovo (FBiH) ===
Balbašići • Bašci • Bistročaj • Bobovica • Boljanovići • Brda • Brutusi • Čeružići • Češina Strana • Čunčići • Dejčići • Delijaš • Divčići • Donja Presjenica • Dujmovići • Durakovići • Godinja • Gornja Presjenica • Govedovići • Gračanica • Hamzići • Ilovice • Jelačići • Karovići • Kozija Luka • Kramari • Krsmanići • Ledići • Lisovići • Lukavac • Mađari • Mijanovići • Obla Brda • Ostojići • Pendičići • Pomenovići • Prečani • Rakitnica • Rijeka • Sjeverovići • Slavljevići • Šabanci • Šabići • Šišići • Trebečaj • Trnovo • Tušila • Umčani • Umoljani • Vrbovnik • Zabojska • Zagor

=== Trnovo (RS) ===
Bogatići • Grab • Jablanica • Kijevo • Klanac • Milje • Podivič • Rajski Do • Tošići • Trnovo • Turovi • Ulobići • Vrbovnik

=== Vogošća ===
Blagovac • Budišići • Donja Vogošća • Garež • Gora • Grahovište • Hotonj • Kamenica • Kobilja Glava • Kremeš • Krivoglavci • Ljubina - Poturovići • Nebočaj • Perca • Semizovac • Svrake • Tihovići • Uglješići • Ugorsko • Vogošća • Vrapče

== Banovići ==
Banovići • Borovac • Ćatići • Gornji Bučik • Grivice • Lozna • Milići • Mrgan • Omazići • Oskova • Podgorje • Pribitkovići • Repnik • Seona • Stražbenica • Treštenica Donja • Treštenica Gornja • Tulovići • Željova

== Banja Luka ==
Agino Selo • Banja Luka • Barlovci • Bastasi • Bistrica • Bočac • Borkovići • Bronzani Majdan • Cerici • Čokori • Debeljaci • Dobrnja • Dragočaj • Drakulić • Dujakovci • Goleši • Ivanjska • Jagare • Kmećani • Kola • Kola Donja • Krmine • Krupa na Vrbasu • Kuljani • Lokvari • Lusići • Ljubačevo • Melina • Motike • Obrovac • Pavići • Pavlovac • Pervan Donji • Pervan Gornji • Piskavica • Ponir • Prijakovci • Priječani • Prnjavor Mali • Radmanići • Radosavska • Ramići • Rekavice • Slavićka • Stratinska • Stričići • Subotica • Šargovac • Šimići • Šljivno • Verići • Vilusi • Zalužani • Zelenci

== Bihać ==
Bajrići • Baljevac • Bihać • Brekovica • Bugar • Ćukovi • Doljani • Donja Gata • Dubovsko • Gorjevac • Grabež • Grmuša • Hrgar • Izačić • Jankovac • Jezero • Kalati • Klisa • Klokot • Kula • Kulen Vakuf • Lipa • Lohovo • Lohovska Brda • Mala Peća • Mali Skočaj • Međudražje • Muslići • Orašac • Ostrovica • Papari • Praščijak • Pritoka • Prnjavor • Račić • Rajinovci • Ripač • Spahići • Srbljani • Teočak • Turija • Velika Gata • Veliki Skočaj • Veliki Stjenjani • Vikići • Vrsta • Zavalje • Zlopoljac

=== Assigned after war ===
• Boboljusci* • Bosanski Osredci • Gornji Tiškovac • Mali Cvjetnić • Malo Očijevo • Martin Brod • Očigrije • Palučci • Trubar • Veliki Cvjetnić • Veliko Očijevo

== Bijeljina ==
Amajlije • Balatun • Banjica • Batar • Batković • Bijeljina • Bjeloševac • Brijesnica • Brodac Donji • Brodac Gornji • Bukovica Donja • Bukovica Gornja • Crnjelovo Donje • Crnjelovo Gornje • Čađavica Donja • Čađavica Gornja • Čađavica Srednja • Čardačine • Čengić • Ćipirovine • Dazdarevo • Dragaljevac Donji • Dragaljevac Gornji • Dragaljevac Srednji • Dvorovi • Glavičice • Glavičorak • Glogovac • Gojsovac • Golo Brdo • Hase • Janja • Johovac • Kacevac • Kojčinovac • Kovanluk • Kriva Bara • Ljeljenča • Ljeskovac • Magnojević Donji • Magnojević Gornji • Magnojević Srednji • Međaši • Modran • Novo Naselje • Novo Selo • Obrijež • Ostojićevo • Patkovača • Piperci • Popovi • Pučile • Ruhotina • Suho Polje • Triješnica • Trnjaci • Velika Obarska • Velino Selo • Vršani • Zagoni

== Bileća ==
Baljci • Bijela Rudina • Bijeljani • Bileća • Bodenik • Bogdašići • Brestice • Čepelica • Deleuša • Divin • Dlakoše • Dola • Donja Meka Gruda • Donji Davidovići • Đeče • Fatnica • Golobrđe • Gornja Meka Gruda • Gornji Davidovići • Granica • Hodžići • Kačanj • Kalac • Korita • Krivača • Krstače • Kukričje • Kuti • Lađevići • Milavići • Mirilovići • Miruše • Mrežica • Narat • Njeganovići • Oblo Brdo • Orah • Orahovice • Pađeni • Panik • Plana • Podgorje • Podosoje • Preraca • Prijevor • Prisoje • Rioca • Selišta • Simijova • Skrobotno • Šobadine • Todorići • Torić • Trnovica • Vlahinja • Vranjska • Vrbica • Zasada • Zaušje • Zvijerina • Žudojevići

== Bosanska Krupa (FBiH) ==
Arapuša • Banjani • Baštra • Benakovac • Bosanska Krupa • Donja Suvaja • Drenova Glavica • Glavica • Gorinja • Gornja Suvaja • Gornji Petrovići • Gudavac • Ivanjska • Jasenica • Jezerski • Ljusina • Mahmić Selo • Mali Badić • Mali Radić • Ostrožnica • Otoka • Perna • Pištaline • Potkalinje • Pučenik • Velika Jasenica • Veliki Badić • Veliki Dubovik • Veliki Radić • Vojevac • Voloder • Vranjska • Zalin

=== Krupa na Uni (RS) ===
Donji Dubovik • Osredak • Donji Petrovići • Gornji Bušević • Hašani • Mali Dubovik • Srednji Bušević • Srednji Dubovik

=== Bužim (FBiH) ===
Bag • Bužim • Dobro Selo • Konjoder • Lubarda • Mrazovac • Varoška Rijeka

== Bosanski Petrovac (FBiH) ==
Bara • Bjelaj • Bjelajski Vaganac • Bosanski Petrovac • Bravski Vaganac • Brestovac • Bukovača • Busije • Cimeše • Dobro Selo • Janjila • Jasenovac • Kapljuh • Klenovac • Kolunić • Krnja Jela • Krnjeuša • Lastve • Medeno Polje • Oraško Brdo • Oštrelj • Prkosi • Rašinovac • Revenik • Risovac • Skakavac • Smoljana • Suvaja • Vedro Polje • Vođenica • Vranovina • Vrtoče

=== Petrovac (RS) ===
• Bunara • Drinić • Podsrnetica

== Bosansko Grahovo ==
Bastasi • Bosansko Grahovo • Crnac • Crni Lug • Donje Peulje • Donji Kazanci • Donji Tiškovac • Duler • Gornje Peulje • Gornji Kazanci • Grkovci • Isjek • Jaruga • Kesići • Korita • Luka • Maleševci • Malo Tičevo • Marinkovci • Mračaj • Nuglašica • Obljaj • Pečenci • Peći • Preodac • Pržine • Radlovići • Resanovci • Stožišta • Ugarci • Uništa • Veliko Tičevo • Vidovići • Zaseok • Zebe

== Bratunac ==
Abdulići • Banjevići • Biljača • Bjelovac • Blječeva • Boljevići • Brana Bačići • Bratunac • Dubravice • Fakovići • Glogova • Hranča • Hrnčići • Jagodnja • Jaketići • Jelah • Ježeštica • Joševa • Konjevići • Krasanovići • Kravica • Lipenovići • Loznica • Magašići • Mihaljevići • Mlečva • Mratinci • Oćenovići • Opravdići • Pirići • Pobrđe • Pobuđe • Podčauš • Polom • Rakovac • Repovac • Sikirić • Slapašnica • Stanatovići • Suha • Šiljkovići • Tegare • Urkovići • Vitkovići • Voljavica • Vraneševići • Zagoni • Zalužje • Zapolje • Žlijebac

== Brčko ==
Bijela • Boće • Boderište • Brčko • Brezik • Brezovo Polje • Brezovo Polje • Brka • Brod • Bukovac • Bukvik Donji • Bukvik Gornji • Buzekara • Cerik • Čađavac • Čande • Čoseta • Donji Rahić • Donji Zovik • Dubrave • Dubravice Donje • Dubravice Gornje • Gajevi • Gorice • Gornji Rahić • Gornji Zovik • Grbavica • Gredice • Islamovac • Krbeta • Krepšić • Laništa • Lukavac • Maoča • Marković Polje • Ograđenovac • Omerbegovača • Palanka • Popovo Polje • Potočari • Rašljani • Ražljevo • Repino Brdo • Sandići • Skakava Donja • Skakava Gornja • Slijepčevići • Stanovi • Šatorovići • Štrepci • Trnjaci • Ulice • Ulović • Vitanovići Donji • Vitanovići Gornji • Vučilovac • Vujičići • Vukšić Donji • Vukšić Gornji

== Breza ==
Banjevac • Breza • Bukovik • Bulbušići • Gornja Breza • Izbod • Kamenice • Koritnik • Mahala • Mahmutovića Rijeka • Nasići • Očevlje • Orahovo • Podgora • Potkraj • Prhinje • Seoce • Slivno • Smailbegovići • Smrekovica • Sutješćica • Trtorići • Vardište • Vijesolići • Vlahinje • Vrbovik • Založje • Župča

== Brod ==
Brod • Brusnica Mala • Brusnica Velika • Donja Barica • Donja Močila • Donja Vrela • Donje Kolibe • Donji Klakar • Gornja Barica • Gornja Močila • Gornja Vrela • Gornje Kolibe • Gornji Klakar • Grk • Koraće • Kričanovo • Kruščik • Liješće • Novo Selo • Sijekovac • Unka • Vinska • Zborište

== Bugojno ==
Alibegovići • Barbarići • Bašići • Bevrnjići • Bode • Brda • Bristovi • Brižina • Bugojno • Ceribašići • Crniče • Čardaci • Čavići • Donji Boganovci • Drvetine • Garačići • Glavice • Golo Brdo • Gornji Boganovci • Goruša • Gračanica • Gredine • Grgići • Hapstići • Harambašići • Hum • Humac • Ivica • Jagodići • Jazvenik • Kadirovina • Kandija • Karadže • Kopčić • Kordići • Koš • Kotezi • Kula • Kunovci • Kutlići • Lenđerovina • Lug • Ljubnić • Maslići • Medini • Milanovići • Mračaj • Nuhići • Odžak • Okolište • Pavice • Pirići • Planinica • Podripci • Poriče • Potočani • Prijaci • Rosulje • Rovna • Sabljari • Seferovići • Servani • Skrte • Stojići • Stolac • Šići • Šušljići • Trge • Udurlije • Vedro Polje • Vesela • Vileši • Vrbanja • Vrpeć • Vučipolje • Zanesovići • Zlavast • Zlokuće • Ždralovići

== Busovača ==
Bare • Bukovci • Buselji • Busovača • Carica • Dobraljevo • Dolac • Donja Rovna • Gornja Rovna • Grablje • Granice • Gusti Grab • Hozanovići • Hrasno • Javor • Jazvine • Jelinak • Kaćuni • Kaonik • Katići • Kovačevac • Krčevine • Krvavičići • Kula • Kupres • Lončari • Mehurići • Merdani • Mihaljevići • Milavice • Nezirovići • Očehnići • Oselište • Podbare • Podjele • Podstijena • Polje • Prosje • Putiš • Ravan • Skradno • Solakovići • Strane • Stubica • Šudine • Turići • Zarače

== Cazin ==
Bajrići • Brezova Kosa • Bukovica • Cazin • Crnaja • Čajići • Čizmići • Ćehići • Ćoralići • Donja Barska • Donja Koprivna • Donja Lučka • Glogovac • Gornja Barska • Gornja Koprivna • Gornja Lučka • Gradina • Hadžin Potok • Kapići • Kličići • Kovačevići • Krakača • Krivaja • Liđani • Liskovac • Ljubijankići • Majetići • Miostrah • Mujakići • Mutnik • Osredak • Ostrožac • Ostrožac na Uni • Pećigrad • Pivnice • Pjanići • Podgredina • Polje • Ponjevići • Prošići • Rošići • Rujnica • Skokovi • Stijena • Šturlić • Šturlićka Platnica • Toromani • Tržac • Tržačka Platnica • Tržačka Raštela • Urga • Vilenjača • Vrelo • Zmajevac

== Čajniče ==
Avlija • Batkovići • Batotići • Batovo • Bezujno • Borajno • Brezovice • Bučkovići na Bezujanci • Čajniče • Đakovići • Glamočevići • Gložin • Hunkovići • Ifsar • Kamen • Kapov Han • Karovići • Krstac • Lađevci • Luke • Međurječje • Metaljka • Milatkovići • Miljeno • Mištar • Podavrelo • Ponikve • Prvanj • Slatina • Staronići • Stopići • Sudići • Todorovići • Trpinje • Tubrojevići • Zaborak

== Čapljina ==
Bajovci • Bivolje Brdo • Crnići • Čapljina • Čeljevo • Doljani • Domanovići • Dračevo • Dretelj • Dubravica • Gabela • Gabela Polje • Gnjilišta • Gorica • Grabovina • Hotanj • Jasenica • Klepci • Lokve • Opličići • Počitelj • Prćavci • Prebilovci • Sjekose • Stanojevići • Struge • Svitava • Ševaš Njive • Šurmanci • Tasovčići • Trebižat • Višići • Zvirovići

== Čelinac ==
Balte • Basići • Branešci Donji • Branešci Gornji • Brezičani • Crni Vrh • Čelinac • Čelinac Gornji • Dubrava Nova • Dubrava Stara • Grabovac • Jošavka Donja • Jošavka Gornja • Kablovi • Kamenica • Lađevci • Lipovac • Markovac • Mehovci • Memići • Miloševo • Opsječko • Popovac • Skatavica • Šahinovići • Šnjegotina Donja • Šnjegotina Srednja • Šnjegotina Velika • Štrbe • Vijačani Gornji

== Čitluk ==
Bijakovići • Biletići • Blatnica • Blizanci • Čalići • Čerin • Čitluk • Dobro Selo • Dragičina • Gradnići • Hamzići • Krehin Gradac • Krućevići • Mali Ograđenik • Međugorje • Paoča • Potpolje • Služanj • Tepčići • Veliki Ograđenik • Vionica

== Derventa ==
Agići • Begluci • Bijelo Brdo • Bosanski Dubočac • Brezici • Bukovac • Bukovica Mala • Bukovica Velika • Bunar • Cerani • Crnča • Dažnica • Derventa • Donja Bišnja • Donja Lupljanica • Donji Detlak • Donji Višnjik • Drijen • Gornja Bišnja • Gornja Lupljanica • Gornji Božinci • Gornji Detlak • Gornji Višnjik • Gradac • Gradina • Kalenderovci Donji • Kalenderovci Gornji • Kostreš • Kovačevci • Kulina • Kuljenovci • Lug • Lužani • Lužani Bosanski • Lužani Novi • Mala Sočanica • Mišinci • Miškovci • Modran • Osinja • Osojci • Pjevalovac • Pojezna • Poljari • Polje • Rapćani • Stanići • Šušnjari • Tetima • Trstenci • Tunjestala • Velika • Velika Sočanica • Vrhovi • Zelenike • Žeravac • Živinice

== Doboj ==
Boljanić • Božinci Donji • Bukovac • Bukovica Mala • Bukovica Velika • Bušletić • Čajre • Čivčije Bukovičke • Čivčije Osječanske • Doboj • Donja Paklenica • Foča • Glogovica • Gornja Paklenica • Grabovica • Grapska Donja • Grapska Gornja • Johovac • Kladari • Komarica • Kostajnica • Kotorsko • Kožuhe • Lipac • Ljeskove Vode • Majevac • Makljenovac • Miljkovac • Opsine • Osječani Donji • Osječani Gornji • Osojnica • Paležnica Donja • Paležnica Gornja • Pločnik • Podnovlje • Porječje • Potočani • Pridjel Donji • Pridjel Gornji • Prisade • Prnjavor Mali • Prnjavor Veliki • Ritešić • Rječica Donja • Rječica Gornja • Sjenina • Sjenina Rijeka • Stanovi • Striježevica • Suho Polje • Svjetliča • Ševarlije • Tekućica • Tisovac • Trbuk • Trnjani • Vranduk • Zarječa • Zelinja Gornja

=== Doboj East (FBiH) ===
Brijesnica Mala • Brijesnica Velika • Klokotnica • Lukavica Rijeka • Stanić Rijeka

=== Doboj South (FBiH) ===
Matuzići • Mravići

== Donji Vakuf ==
Babin Potok • Babino Selo • Barice • Blagaj • Brda • Brdo • Brezičani • Ćehajići • Ćemalovići • Daljan • Dobro Brdo • Doganovci • Dolovi • Donji Rasavci • Donji Vakuf • Đulovići • Fakići • Fonjge • Galešići • Grabantići • Gredina • Grič • Guvna • Hemići • Jablan • Jemanlići • Karići • Keže • Komar • Korenići • Košćani • Kovačevići • Krivače • Kutanja • Makitani • Novo Selo • Oborci • Orahovljani • Petkovići • Piljužići • Pobrđani • Ponjavići • Potkraj • Pribraća • Prisika • Prusac • Rasavci • Rastičevo • Rudina • Ruska Pilana • Sandžak • Semin • Silajdževina • Slatina • Sokolina • Staro Selo • Suhodol • Sultanovići • Šahmani • Šatare • Šeherdžik • Šutkovići • Torlakovac • Urija • Vlađevići • Vrbas • Vrljaj

== Drvar (FBiH) ==
Ataševac • Bastasi • Brda • Bunčevac • Drvar • Drvar Selo • Gruborski Naslon • Kamenica • Ljeskovica • Mokronoge • Motike • Mrđe • Podić • Podovi • Poljice • Prekaja • Šajinovac • Šipovljani • Trninić Brijeg • Vidovo Selo • Vrtoče • Zaglavica • Župa • Župica

=== Istočni Drvar (RS) ===
Potoci • Srnetica • Uvala

== Foča ==
Anđelije • Bastasi • Beleni • Biokovo • Birotići • Bogavići • Borje • Borovinići • Brajići • Brajkovići • Brod • Brusna • Budanj • Bujakovina • Bunovi • Cerova Ravan • Crnetići • Čelebići • Čelikovo Polje • Ćurevo • Daničići • Derolovi • Drače • Dragočava • Dragojevići • Đeđevo • Fališi • Foča • Glušca • Godijeno • Gostičaj • Govza • Gradac • Grandići • Grdijevići • Hum • Huseinovići • Igoče • Izbišno • Jasenovo • Ječmišta • Jeleč • Jošanica • Kolun • Kosman • Kozarevina • Kozja Luka • Kratine • Krna Jela • Kruševo • Kunduci • Kunovo • Kuta • Ljubina • Marevo • Mazoče • Meštrevac • Miljevina • Mirjanovići • Mješaji • Orahovo • Papratno • Patkovina • Paunci • Poljice • Popov Most • Potpeće • Prevrać • Prijeđel • Puriši • Rijeka • Slatina • Susješno • Škobalji • Štović • Šuljci • Tečići • Tjentište • Tođevac • Toholji • Trbušće • Trtoševo • Tvrdaci • Velenići • Vikoč • Vitine • Vojnovići • Vranjevići • Vrbnica • Vučevo • Vukušići • Zakmur • Zavait • Zubovići • Željevo

=== Foča-Ustikolina (FBiH) ===
Bavčići • Bešlići • Bunčići • Cvilin • Donje Žešće • Filipovići • Jabuka • Kolakovići • Lokve • Mazlina • Mravljača • Njuhe • Petojevići • Podgrađe • Previla • Prisoje • Račići • Radojevići • Rodijelj • Slavičići • Sorlaci • Stojkovići • Ustikolina • Zabor • Zebina Šuma

== Fojnica ==
Bakovići • Bakovićka Citonja • Banja • Bistrica • Botun • Božići • Carev Do • Čemernica • Djedov Do • Dragačići • Dusina • Fojnica • Gojevići • Grabovik • Gradina • Klisura • Kozica • Kujušići • Lopar • Lučice • Lužine • Majdan • Marinići • Merdžanići • Mujakovići • Nadbare • Obojak • Oglavak • Ormanov Potok • Ostruška Citonja • Otigošće • Paljike • Pločari • Pločari Polje • Podcitonja • Podgora • Polje Ostružnica • Polje Šćitovo • Ponjušina • Poraće • Ragale • Rajetići • Rizvići • Selakovići • Selište • Sitišće • Smajlovići • Šavnik • Tješilo • Tovarište • Turkovići • Vladići • Voljevac • Vukeljići • Živčići

== Gacko ==
Avtovac • Bahori • Bašići • Berušica • Brajićevići • Branilovići • Cernica • Čemerno • Danići • Dobrelji • Domrke • Donja Bodežišta • Dramešina • Dražljevo • Drugovići • Dubljevići • Fojnica • Gacko • Gareva • Gornja Bodežišta • Gračanica • Gradina • Hodinići • Igri • Izgori • Jabuka • Jasenik • Jugovići • Kazanci • Ključ • Kokorina • Kravarevo • Kula • Lipnik • Lončari • Luka • Lukovice • Ljeskov Dub • Medanići • Međuljići • Mekavci • Melečići • Miholjače • Mjedenik • Mrđenovići • Muhovići • Nadinići • Novi Dulići • Platice • Poda • Pridvorica • Pržine • Ravni • Rudo Polje • Samobor • Slivlja • Soderi • Srđevići • Stambelići • Stari Dulići • Stepen • Stolac • Šipovica • Šumići • Ulinje • Višnjevo • Vratkovići • Vrba • Zagradci • Zurovići • Žanjevica

== Glamoč ==
Babića Brdo • Biličić • Crni Vrh • Ćirići • Ćoslije • Dolac • Dragnjić • Dubrave • Đuličan • Glamoč • Glavica • Halapić • Hasanbegovci • Hasići • Hotkovci • Hozići • Hrbine • Isakovci • Jakir • Kamen • Karajzovci • Karlovac • Kopić • Korićna • Kovačevci • Krasinac • Malkočevci • Malo Selo • Maslina Strana • Mladeškovci • Odžak • Opačić • Perduhovo Selo • Petrovo Vrelo • Podglavica • Podgradina • Podgreda • Potkraj • Popovići • Pribelja • Prijani • Radaslije • Rajićke • Reljino Selo • Rore • Rudine • Skucani • Staro Selo • Stekerovci • Šumnjaci • Vagan • Vidimlije • Vrba • Zaglavica • Zajaruga

== Goražde (FBiH) ==
Ahmovići • Bačci • Bahovo • Bakije • Bare • Batkovići • Bezmilje • Biljin • Bogušići • Borovići • Boškovići • Brajlovići • Bratiš • Brekovi • Brezje • Brijeg • Budići • Butkovići • Butkovići Ilovača • Crvica • Čitluk • Čovčići • Čurovi • Ćatovići • Ćehajići • Deševa • Donja Brda • Donja Bukvica • Donji Bogovići • Dučići • Džindići • Faočići • Gaj • Glamoč • Gočela • Goražde • Gornja Brda • Gornja Bukvica • Gornji Bogovići • Grabovik • Gunjačići • Gunjevići • Gusići • Guskovići • Hadžići • Hrančići • Ilino • Ilovača • Jagodići • Jarovići • Kalac • Kamen • Kazagići • Knjevići • Kodžaga Polje • Kola • Kolijevke • Kolovarice • Konjbaba • Konjevići • Kosače • Kovači • Kraboriš • Kreča • Kučine • Kušeši • Kutješi • Laleta • Lukarice • Markovići • Mirvići • Mirvići na Podhranjenu • Morinac • Mravi • Mravinjac • Mrkovi • Nekopi • Orahovice • Oručevac • Osanica • Osječani • Ostružno • Ozrenovići • Paraun • Perjani • Pijestina • Pijevac • Plesi • Podhranjen • Poratak • Potrkuša • Prisoje • Radići • Radovovići • Raškovići • Ratkovići • Rešetnica • Ropovići • Rosijevići • Sedlari • Sijedac • Skravnik • Slatina • Sofići • Spahovići • Šabanci • Šašići • Šehovići • Šemihova • Šućurići • Tupačići • Ušanovići • Utješinovići • Vitkovići • Vlajčići • Vraneši • Vranići • Vranpotok • Vrbica • Vremci • Vučetići • Zabus • Završje • Zorovići • Zupčići • Žigovi • Žilići

=== Novo Goražde (RS) ===
• Bašabulići • Blagojevići • Bogdanići • Borak Brdo • Borova • Bosanje • Bučje • Donje Selo* • Dragolji • Dragovići • Džuha • Đakovići • Gojčevići • Gradac • Hajradinovići • Hladila • Hrid • Hrušanj • Hubjeri* • Jabuka • Kanlići • Karauzovići • Karovići • Kopači • Kostenik • Krašići • Ljeskovik • Mašići • Milanovići • Nevorići • Novakovići • Odžak • Podhomara • Podkozara Donja* • Podkozara Gornja • Podmeljine • Pribjenovići • Prolaz • Pršeši • Radijevići • Radmilovići • Rusanj • Seoca • Sopotnica • Surovi • Šovšići • Trebeševo • Uhotići • Ustiprača • Vlahovići • Zakalje • Zapljevac • Zemegresi • Zidine • Zorlaci • Zubovići • Zubovići u Oglečevi • Žitovo • Živojevići • Žuželo

== Gornji Vakuf (FBiH) ==
Batuša • Bistrica • Bojska • Boljkovac • Borova Ravan • Crkvice • Cvrče • Dobrošin • Donja Ričica • Dražev Dol • Duratbegov Dolac • Duša • Gaj • Galičica • Gornja Ričica • Gornji Mračaj • Gornji Vakuf • Grnica • Hrasnica • Humac • Jagnjid • Jelače • Jelići • Kozice • Krupa • Kute • Lužani • Mačkovac • Mračaj • Osredak • Pajić Polje • Paloč • Pidriš • Ploča • Podgrađe • Pridvorci • Rosulje • Seferovići • Seoci • Smrčevice • Svilići • Šugine Bare • Uzričje • Vaganjac • Valice • Vilić Polje • Voljevac • Voljice • Vrse • Zastinje • Ždrimci

== Gračanica ==
Babići • Bosansko Petrovo Selo • Doborovci • Donja Lohinja • Džakule • Gornja Lohinja • Gračanica • Lendići • Lukavica • Malešići • Miričina • Orahovica Donja • Orahovica Gornja • Piskavica • Pribava • Prijeko Brdo • Rašljeva • Skipovac Donji • Skipovac Gornji • Soko • Stjepan Polje • Škahovica • Vranovići

=== Petrovo (RS) ===
Kakmuž • Karanovac • Krtova • Porječina • Petrovo • Sočkovac

== Gradačac (FBiH) ==
Avramovina • Biberovo Polje • Donja Međiđa • Donje Krečane • Donji Lukavac • Donji Skugrić • Gornja Međiđa • Gornje Krečane • Gornji Lukavac • Gradačac • Hrgovi Donji • Jasenica • Jelovče Selo • Kerep • Krčevljani • Mionica • Novalići • Rajska • Sibovac • Srnice Donje • Srnice Gornje • Tolisa • Vida • Vučkovci • Zelinja Donja • Zelinja Srednja

=== Pelagićevo (RS) ===
• Blaževac • Pelagićevo • Donja Tramošnica • Donje Ledenice • Gornja Tramošnica • Gornje Ledenice • Njivak • Orlovo Polje • Porebrice • Samarevac • Turić

== Gradiška ==
Adžići • Berek • Bistrica • Bok Jankovac • Brestovčina • Bukovac • Cerovljani • Cimiroti • Čatrnja • Čelinovac • Čikule • Donja Dolina • Donja Jurkovica • Donji Karajzovci • Donji Podgradci • Dragelji • Dubrave • Elezagići • Gašnica • Gornja Dolina • Gornja Jurkovica • Gornja Lipovača • Gornji Karajzovci • Gornji Podgradci • Gradiška • Grbavci • Greda • Jablanica • Jazovac • Kijevci • Kočićevo • Kozara • Kozinci • Krajišnik • Kruškik • Laminci Brezici • Laminci Dubrave • Laminci Jaružani • Laminci Sređani • Liskovac • Lužani • Mačkovac • Mašići • Mičije • Miloševo Brdo • Miljevići • Mokrice • Nova Topola • Novo Selo • Orahova • Orubica • Petrovo Selo • Rogolji • Romanovci • Rovine • Samardžije • Seferovci • Sovjak • Srednja Jurkovica • Šaškinovci • Trebovljani • Trnovac • Trošelji • Turjak • Vakuf • Vilusi • Vrbaška • Žeravica

== Grude ==
Blaževići • Borajna • Donji Mamići • Dragičina • Drinovačko Brdo • Drinovci • Gorica • Grude • Jabuka • Puteševica • Ružići • Sovići • Tihaljina

== Han Pijesak ==
Babine Gornje • Berkovina • Brložnik • Džimrije • Gođenje • Han Pijesak • Japaga • Jelovci • Kraljevo Polje • Kram • Krivače • Kusače • Malo Polje • Mrkalji • Nerići • Nevačka • Pjenovac • Plane • Podžeplje • Potkozlovača • Ravanjsko • Rečica • Rijeke • Rubinići • Stoborani • Žeravice

== Jablanica ==
Baćina • Bijela • Čehari • Čivelj • Dobrigošće • Dobrinja • Doljani • Donja Jablanica • Donje Paprasko • Dragan Selo • Đevor • Glodnica • Glogošnica • Gornje Paprasko • Jablanica • Jelačići • Kosne Luke • Krstac • Lendava • Lug • Mirke • Mrakovo • Ostrožac • Poda • Ravna • Risovac • Rodići • Slatina • Sovići • Šabančići • Šanica • Zlate • Žuglići

== Jajce (FBiH) ==
Bare • Barevo • Bavar • Biokovina • Bistrica • Borci • Božikovac • Bravnice • Brvanci • Bučići • Bulići • Carevo Polje • Cvitović • Ćusine • Divičani • Dogani • Donji Bešpelj • Doribaba • Dubrave • Gornji Bešpelj • Grabanta • Grdovo • Ipota • Jajce • Kamenice • Karići • Kasumi • Klimenta • Kokići • Krezluk • Kruščica • Kuprešani • Lendići • Lučina • Lupnica • Magarovci • Mile • Peratovci • Podlipci • Podmilačje • Prudi • Pšenik • Rika • Selište • Seoci • Smionica • Stare Kuće • Šerići • Šibenica • Vinac • Vrbica • Vukičevci • Zdaljevac • Žaovine

=== Jezero (RS) ===
• Borci • Čerkazovići • Drenov Do • Đumezlije • Jezero • Kovačevac • Ljoljići • Perućica • Prisoje

== Kakanj ==
Alagići • Bastašići • Bašići • Bičer • Bijele Vode • Bijelo Polje • Bilješevo • Bistrik - Crkvenjak • Bištrani • Bjelavići • Bosna • Brežani • Brnj • Brnjic • Bukovlje • Crnač • Čatići • Danci • Desetnik • Doboj • Donja Papratnica • Donji Banjevac • Donji Kakanj • Donji Lučani • Dračići • Drijen • Dubovo Brdo • Dumanac • Gora • Gornja Papratnica • Gornji Banjevac • Gornji Lučani • Govedovići • Gradac • Groce • Halinovići • Haljinići • Hausovići • Hodžići • Hrasno • Hrastovac • Ivnica • Javor • Jehovina • Jerevice • Jezero • Kakanj • Karaula • Karaulsko Polje • Klanac • Kondžilo • Koprivnica • Kraljevska Sutjeska • Krševac • Kučići • Kujavče • Lipnica • Lučići • Lukovo Brdo • Marijina Voda • Miljačići • Mioči • Modrinje • Mramor • Nažbilj • Obre • Papratno • Pavlovići • Pedići • Podbjelavići • Podborje • Poljani • Poljice • Pope • Popržena Gora • Ratanj • Ribnica • Ričica • Rojin Potok • Saranovići • Sebinje • Semetiš • Seoce • Slagoščići • Slapnica • Slivanj • Slivnice • Sopotnica • Starposle • Subotinje • Termoelektrana • Teševo • Tičići • Tršće • Turalići • Turbići • Varalići • Veliki Trnovci • Viduša • Vrtlište • Vukanovići • Zagrađe • Zgošća • Zlokuće • Željeznička Stanica Kakanj • Živalji

== Kalesija (FBiH) ==
Brezik • Bulatovci • Dubnica • Hrasno Donje • Hrasno Gornje • Jeginov Lug • Jelovo Brdo • Kalesija • Kalesija (selo) • Kikači • Lipovice • Memići • Miljanovci • Petrovice • Prnjavor • Rainci Donji • Rainci Gornji • Sarači • Seljublje • Staro Selo • Tojšići • Vukovije Donje • Vukovije Gornje • Zolje • Zukići

=== Osmaci (RS) ===
Borogovo • Caparde • Gojčin • Hajvazi • Kosovača • Kulina • Kusonje • Mahala • Matkovac • Osmaci • Rakino Brdo • Sajtovići • Šeher • Viličevići • Zelina

== Kalinovik (RS) ==
Bak • Bojići • Boljanovići • Borija • Božanovići • Brda • Bukvica • Cerova • Čestaljevo • Daganj • Dobro Polje • Dragomilići • Dubrava • Gapići • Golubići • Gradina • Graiseljići • Gvozno • Hotovlje • Hreljići • Jablanići • Jažići • Jelašca • Jezero • Kalinovik • Klinja • Kolakovići • Kovačići • Krbljine • Kruščica • Kuta • Kutine • Luko • Ljusići • Ljuta • Mekoča • Mjehovina • Mosorovići • Mušići • Nedavić • Obadi • Obalj • Obrnja • Osija • Plačikus • Pločnik • Polje • Popovići • Porija • Presjedovac • Rajac • Rastovac • Ruđice • Sela • Sijerča • Sočani • Strane • Susječno • Šivolji • Tmuše • Tomišlja • Trešnjevica • Trnovica • Tuhobić • Ulog • Unukovići • Varizi • Varoš • Vihovići • Vlaholje • Vrhovina • Vujinovići • Zelomići

== Kiseljak ==
Azapovići • Badnje • Behrići • Bilalovac • Bliznice • Boljkovići • Borina • Brizje • Brnjaci • Bukovica • Buzuci • Čalikovac • Čizma • Čubren • Datići • Demići • Devetaci • Doci • Donji Palež • Draževići • Dubrave • Dugo Polje • Duhri • Duke • Gaj • Gojakovac • Gomionica • Gornji Palež • Gradac • Grahovci • Gromiljak • Gunjače • Hadrovci • Han Ploča • Hercezi • Homolj • Hrastovi • Ivica • Jehovac • Katunište • Kazagići • Kiseljak • Kotačala • Kovači • Krčevine • Križići • Kuliješ • Lug • Ljetovik • Mahala Gomionica • Mahala Višnjica • Male Sotnice • Markovići • Maslinovići • Medovci • Medovići • Miroševići • Mrakovi • Odrače • Paretak • Pariževići • Pobrđe Milodraž • Pobrđe Orahovo • Podastinje • Podastinjsko Brdo • Polje Višnjica • Potkraj • Radanovići • Radeljevići • Rauševac • Rotilj • Solakovići • Stojkovići • Svinjarevo • Šahinovići • Toplica • Tulica • Velike Sotnice • Višnjica • Zabrđe • Završje • Žeželovo

== Kladanj ==
Brateljevići • Brdijelji • Brgule • Brlošci • Buševo • Crijevčići • Dole • Gojakovići • Gojsalići • Goletići • Jelačići • Jošje • Kladanj • Konjevići • Kovačići • Krivajevići • Lupoglavo • Majdan • Mala Kula • Matijevići • Mladovo • Noćajevići • Novo Naselje - Stupari • Obrćevac • Olovci • Pauč • Pelemiši • Pepići • Plahovići • Prijanovići • Prijevor • Ravne • Rujići • Starić • Stupari - Centar • Stupari - Selo • Suljići • Tarevo • Tuholj • Velika Kula • Vranovići • Vučinići • Zagrađe

== Ključ (FBiH) ==
Biljani Donji • Biljani Gornji • Budelj Gornji • Crljeni • Donje Ratkovo* • Donje Sokolovo* • Donji Ramići • Donji Vojići • Dubočani* • Gornje Ratkovo* • Gornji Ramići • Gornji Vojići • Hadžići • Hasići • Hripavci • Humići • Jarice* • Kamičak • Ključ • Kopjenica • Korjenovo • Krasulje • Lanište • Ljubine* • Međeđe Brdo • Mijačica • Peći • Pištanica • Plamenice • Prhovo • Prisjeka Donja • Prisjeka Gornja • Rudenice • Sanica • Sanica Donja • Sanica Gornja • Velagići • Velečevo* • Zavolje • Zgon

=== Ribnik (RS) ===
• Busije • Crkveno • Čađavica • Donja Previja • Donja Slatina • Donje Ratkovo* • Donji Ribnik • Donje Sokolovo* • Donji Vrbljani • Dragoraj • Dubočani • Gornja Previja • Gornja Slatina • Gornje Ratkovo* • Gornje Sokolovo • Gornji Ribnik • Gornji Vrbljani • Jarice* • Ljubine* • Rastoka • Sitnica • Sredice • Stražice • Treskavac • Velijašnica • Velije • Velečevo* • Zableće

== Kneževo (RS) ==
Bastaji • Bokani • Borak • Bregovi • Brnjići • Bunar • Čarići • Ćukovac • Davidovići • Dobretići • Donji Orašac • Golo Brdo • Gornji Orašac • Imljani • Javorani • Kneževo • Kobilja • Kostići • Kričići - Jejići • Melina • Mijatovići • Milaševci • Mokri Lug • Paunovići • Pavlovići • Prisika • Rađići • Slipčevići • Šolaji • Vitovlje Malo • Vlatkovići • Vukovići • Zapeće • Zasavica • Zubovići • Živinice

== Konjic ==
Argud • Bale • Bare • Barmiš • Bijela • Bjelovčina • Blace • Blučići • Borci • Boždarevići • Bradina • Brđani • Budišnja Ravan • Bukovica • Bukovlje • Bulatovići • Bušćak • Buturović Polje • Cerići • Crni Vrh • Čelebići • Čelina • Čičevo • Čuhovići • Dobričevići • Dolovi • Doljani • Donja Vratna Gora • Donje Selo • Donje Višnjevice • Donji Čažanj • Donji Gradac • Donji Nevizdraci • Donji Prijeslop • Došćica • Dubočani • Dubravice • Dudle • Dužani • Džajići • Džanići • Džepi • Falanovo Brdo • Gakići • Galjevo • Glavatičevo • Gobelovina • Gorani • Goransko Polje • Gorica • Gornja Vratna Gora • Gornje Višnjevice • Gornji Čažanj • Gornji Gradac • Gornji Nevizdraci • Gostovići • Grabovci • Gradeljina • Grušča • Hasanovići • Herići • Homatlije • Homolje • Hondići • Idbar • Jasenik • Javorik • Jezero • Ježeprosina • Jošanica • Kale • Kanjina • Kašići • Konjic • Kostajnica • Koto • Krajkovići • Kralupi • Krtići • Krupac • Krušćica • Kula • Lađanica • Lisičići • Lokva • Luka • Lukomir • Lukšije • Ljesovina • Ljubuča • Ljuta • Mladeškovići • Mokro • Mrkosovice • Obrenovac • Obri • Odžaci • Orahovica • Orlište • Oteležani • Ovčari • Pačerani • Parsovići • Plavuzi • Podhum • Podorašac • Pokojište • Polje Bijela • Požetva • Prevlje • Radešine • Raotići • Rasvar • Razići • Redžići • Repovci • Repovica • Ribari • Ribići • Seljani • Seonica • Sitnik • Slavkovići • Solakova Kula • Sopot • Spiljani • Stojkovići • Strgonice • Studenčica • Sultići • Svijenča • Šunji • Tinje • Tovarnica • Treboje • Trešnjevica • Trusina • Tuhobići • Turija • Ugošće • Veluša • Vinište • Vrbljani • Vrci • Vrdolje • Zabrđani • Zabrđe • Zagorice • Zaslivlje • Zukići

== Kostajnica ==
Gornja Slabinja • Grdanovac • Gumnjani • Kalenderi • Kostajnica • Mrakodol • Mraovo Polje • Petrinja • Pobrđani • Podoška • Tavija • Zovik

== Kotor Varoš ==
Baština • Bilice • Bobovice • Boljanići • Borci Donji • Borci Gornji • Burča • Ćorkovići • Dabovci • Demići • Donje Šiprage • Dunići • Duratovci • Garići • Gelići • Gigovići • Gornje Šiprage • Grabovica • Grič • Hadrovci • Hrvaćani • Jakotina • Kerle • Kotor Varoš • Kovačevići • Kruševo Brdo I • Kruševo Brdo II • Liplje • Lipovac • Maljeva • Maslovare • Obodnik • Orahova • Palivuk • Pilipovina • Plitska • Podbrđe • Podosoje • Postoje • Previle • Prisočka • Radohova • Ravne • Selačka • Sokoline • Stopan • Šibovi • Šiprage • Tovladić • Tuleža • Vagani • Varjače • Večići • Viševice • Vranić • Vrbanjci • Zabrđe • Zagrađe • Zaselje • Zuhrići

== Kozarska Dubica ==
Aginci • Babinac • Bačvani • Bijakovac • Bjelajci • Božići • Brekinja • Čelebinci • Čitluk • Čuklinac • Demirovac • Dizdarlije • Donja Jutrogošta • Donja Slabinja • Donji Jelovac • Draksenić • Furde • Gornja Gradina • Gornjoselci • Gradina Donja • Gunjevci • Hadžibajir • Hajderovci • Jasenje • Johova • Jošik • Kadin Jelovac • Klekovci • Knežica • Komlenac • Košuća • Koturovi • Kozarska Dubica • Kriva Rijeka • Maglajci • Malo Dvorište • Međeđa • Međuvođe • Mirkovac • Mlječanica • Mrazovci • Murati • Novoselci • Odžinci • Parnice • Pobrđani • Pucari • Rakovica • Sjeverovci • Sključani • Sreflije • Strigova • Suvaja • Ševarlije • Tuključani • Ušivac • Veliko Dvorište • Verija • Vlaškovci • Vojskova • Vrioci

== Kreševo ==
Alagići • Bjelovići • Botunja • Bukva • Crkvenjak • Crnički Kamenik • Crnići • Deževice • Drežnice • Gunjani • Kojsina • Komari • Kreševo • Kreševski Kamenik • Lipa • Mratinići • Pirin • Poljani • Polje • Rakova Noga • Ratkovići • Stojčići • Vidosovići • Vodovoji • Volujak • Vranci • Zvizd

== Kupres ==
Barjamovci • Begovo Selo • Bili Potok • Blagaj • Botun • Brda • Bućovača • Donje Ravno • Donje Vukovsko • Donji Malovan • Goravci • Gornje Ravno • Gornje Vukovsko • Gornji Malovan • Kudilji • Kukavice • Kupres • Kute • Mlakva • Mrđebare • Mušić • Odžak • Olovo • Osmanlije • Otinovci • Rilić • Stražbenica • Suhova • Vrila • Zanaglina • Zlosela • Zvirnjača

=== Kupres ===
Mrđanovci • Novo Selo • Rastičevo • Šemenovci

== Laktaši ==
Aleksići • Bakinci • Bosanski Aleksandrovac • Boškovići • Bukovica • Čardačani • Ćetojevići • Devetina • Dovići • Drugovići • Glamočani • Jablan • Jakupovci • Jaružani • Kadinjani • Kobatovci • Koljani • Kosijerovo • Kriškovci • Krnete • Laktaši • Ljubatovci • Maglajani • Mahovljani • Malo Blaško • Milosavci • Miloševci • Mrčevci • Papažani • Petoševci • Rajčevci • Riječani • Slatina • Šeškovci • Šušnjari • Trn • Veliko Blaško

== Livno ==
Bila • Bilo Polje • Bogdaše • Bojmunte • Čaić • Čaprazlije • Čelebić • Čuklić • Ćosanlije • Dobro • Donji Rujani • Drinova Međa • Držanlije • Golinjevo • Gornji Rujani • Grborezi • Grgurići • Gubin • Komorani • Kovačić • Lipa • Lištani • Livno • Lopatice • Lusnić • Ljubunčić • Mali Guber • Mali Kablići • Miši • Odžak • Orguz • Podgradina • Podgreda • Podhum • Potkraj • Potočani • Potok • Priluka • Prisap • Prolog • Provo • Radanovci • Rapovine • Sajković • Smričani • Srđevići • Strupnić • Suhača • Tribić • Veliki Guber • Veliki Kablići • Vidoši • Vrbica • Vržerala • Zabrišće • Zagoričani • Zastinje • Žabljak • Žirović

== Lopare (RS) ==
Bobetino Brdo • Brezje* • Brijest • Brnjik* • Brusnica • Bučje • Jablanica • Koraj • Koretaši • Kozjak • Labucka • Lipovice • Lopare • Lukavica* • Mačkovac • Miladići* • Milino Selo • Mirosavci • Mrtvica • Peljave • Piperi • Pirkovci • Podgora • Priboj • Pukiš • Puškovac • Smiljevac • Tobut • Vakuf • Vukosavci

=== Čelić (FBiH) ===
• Brezje* • Brnjik* • Bučje* • Čelić • Drijenča • Humci • Lukavica* • Miladići* • Nahvioci • Ratkovići • Šibošnica • Velino Selo • Visori • Vražići

== Lukavac ==
Babice Donje • Babice Gornje • Berkovica • Bikodže • Bistarac Donji • Bistarac Gornji • Bokavići • Borice • Brijesnica Donja • Brijesnica Gornja • Caparde • Cerik • Crveno Brdo • Devetak • Dobošnica • Gnojnica • Huskići • Jaruške Donje • Jaruške Gornje • Kalajevo • Komari • Kruševica • Lukavac • Lukavac Gornji • Mičijevići • Milino Selo • Modrac • Orahovica • Poljice • Prline • Prokosovići • Puračić • Smoluća Donja • Smoluća Gornja • Semići • Sižje • Stupari • Šikulje • Tabaci • Tumare • Turija • Vasiljevci • Vijenac

== Ljubinje ==
Bančići • Dubočica • Gleđevci • Grablje • Gradac • Ivica • Kapavica • Krajpolje • Krtinje • Kruševica • Ljubinje • Mišljen • Obzir • Pocrnje • Pustipusi • Rankovci • Ubosko • Vlahovići • Vođeni • Žabica • Žrvanj

== Ljubuški ==
Bijača • Cerno • Crnopod • Crveni Grm • Dole • Grab • Grabovnik • Gradska • Greda • Grljevići • Hardomilje • Hrašljani • Humac • Kašće • Klobuk • Lipno • Lisice • Ljubuški • Miletina • Mostarska Vrata • Orahovlje • Otok • Pregrađe • Proboj • Prolog • Radišići • Stubica • Studenci • Šipovača • Teskera • Vašarovići • Veljaci • Vitina • Vojnići • Zvirići

== Maglaj ==
Bakotić • Bijela Ploča • Bradići Donji • Bradići Gornji • Brezici • Brezove Dane • Brusnica • Čobe • Domislica • Donja Bočinja • Donja Bukovica • Donji Rakovac • Donji Ulišnjak • Gornja Bočinja • Gornja Bukovica • Gornji Rakovac • Gornji Ulišnjak • Jablanica • Kamenica • Kopice • Kosova • Krsno Polje • Liješnica • Lugovi • Maglaj • Misurići • Mladoševica • Moševac • Novi Šeher • Oruče • Ošve • Parnica • Poljice • Radojčići • Rajnovo Brdo • Ravna • Straište • Strupina • Tujnica

== Milići ==
Bačići • Bešići • Bijelo Polje • Bišina • Bukovica Donja • Bukovica Gornja • Buljevići • Derventa • Donje Vrsinje • Dubačko • Dubnica • Dukići • Đile • Đurđevići • Gerovi • Glušac • Golići • Gornje Vrsinje • Gunjaci • Jeremići • Kokanovići • Koprivno • Kostrača • Krajčinovići • Lukavica • Lukići • Maćesi • Milići • Mišići • Nova Kasaba • Nurići • Pavkovići • Podbirač • Podgora • Pomol • Rajići • Raševo • Raškovići • Ristijevići • Rovaši • Rupovo Brdo • Sebiočina • Skugrići • Supač • Štedra • Toljevići • Višnjica • Vitići • Vrtoče • Vukovići • Vukšići • Zabrđe • Zagrađe • Zaklopača

== Modriča ==
Babešnica • Botajica • Čardak • Dobra Voda • Dobrinja • Dugo Polje • Garevac • Kladari Donji • Kladari Gornji • Koprivna • Kužnjača • Miloševac • Modriča • Riječani Donji • Riječani Gornji • Skugrić Gornji • Tarevci • Vranjak

== Mostar (FBiH) ==
Baćevići • Banjdol • Blagaj • Bogodol • Buna • Cim • Čule • Dobrč • Donja Drežnica • Donji Jasenjani • Dračevice • Gnojnice • Goranci • Gornja Drežnica • Gornje Gnojnice • Gornji Jasenjani • Gubavica • Hodbina • Humilišani • Ilići • Jasenica • Kosor • Kremenac • Krivodol • Kružanj • Kutilivač • Lakševine • Malo Polje • Miljkovići • Mostar • Ortiješ • Pijesci • Podgorani • Podgorje • Podvelež • Polog • Potoci • Prigrađani • Raška Gora • Raštani • Ravni • Rodoč • Selište • Slipčići • Sovići • Sretnice • Striževo • Vihovići • Vojno • Vranjevići • Vrapčići • Vrdi • Željuša • Žitomislići • Žulja

=== Istočni Mostar (RS) ===
• Kamena • Kokorina • Zijemlje

== Mrkonjić Grad ==
Baljvine • Bjelajce • Brdo • Dabrac • Donja Pecka • Donja Podgorja • Donji Baraći • Donji Graci • Dubica • Gerzovo • Gornja Pecka • Gornja Podgorja • Gornji Baraći • Gornji Graci • Gustovara • Jasenovi Potoci • Kopljevići • Kotor • Liskovica • Magaljdol • Majdan • Medna • Mlinište • Mrkonjić Grad • Oćune • Okandžije • Orahovljani • Podbrdo • Podorugla • Podrašnica • Stupari • Surjan • Šehovci • Šibovi • Trijebovo • Trnovo • Ubavića Brdo • Vlasinje

== Neum ==
Babin Do • Borut • Brestica • Broćanac • Brštanica • Cerovica • Cerovo • Crnoglav • Dobri Do • Dobrovo • Donji Drijen • Donji Zelenikovac • Dubravica • Duži • Glumina • Gornje Hrasno • Gradac • Hotanj Hutovski • Hutovo • Kiševo • Moševići • Neum • Prapratnica • Previš • Rabrani • Vinine • Žukovica

== Nevesinje ==
Batkovići • Bežđeđe • Biograd • Bojišta • Borovčići • Bratač • Budisavlje • Ćesim • Donja Bijenja • Donji Drežanj • Donji Lukavac • Dramiševo • Gaj • Gornja Bijenja • Gornji Drežanj • Gornji Lukavac • Grabovica • Hrušta • Humčani • Jasena • Jugovići • Kifino Selo • Kljen • Kljuna • Kovačići • Krekovi • Kruševljani • Lakat • Luka • Miljevac • Nevesinje • Odžak • Plužine • Podgrađe • Postoljani • Presjeka • Pridvorci • Prkovići • Rabina • Rast • Rilja • Rogače • Seljani • Slato • Sopilja • Studenci • Šehovina • Šipačno • Trusina • Udrežnje • Zaborani • Zalom • Zalužje • Zovi Do • Žiljevo • Žuberin

== Novi Grad ==
Ahmetovci • Blagaj Japra • Blagaj Rijeka • Blatna • Cerovica • Crna Rijeka • Čađavica Donja • Čađavica Gornja • Čađavica Srednja • Ćele • Devetaci • Dobrljin • Donje Vodičevo • Donji Agići • Donji Rakani • Gornje Vodičevo • Gornji Agići • Gornji Rakani • Grabašnica • Hozići • Johovica • Jošava • Kršlje • Kuljani • Lješljani • Mala Krupska Rujiška • Mala Novska Rujiška • Mala Žuljevica • Maslovare • Matavazi • Mazić • Novi Grad • Petkovac • Poljavnice • Prusci • Radomirovac • Rakovac • Rašće • Ravnice • Rudice • Sokolište • Suhača • Svodna • Trgovište • Vedovica • Velika Rujiška • Velika Žuljevica • Vitasovci

== Novi Travnik ==
Balići • Bistro • Božići • Bučići • Budušići • Bugojčići • Bukvići • Čakići • Čehova • Dahovo • Donje Pećine • Duboko • Đakovići • Gornje Pećine • Hadžići • Has • Isakovići • Kasapovići • Kopila • Kovačići • Krnjića Potok • Lisac • Margetići • Monjići • Nević Polje • Nova Opara • Novi Travnik • Opara • Orašac • Pečuj • Petačići • Potočani • Pribilovići • Pričani • Rankovići • Rastovci • Rat • Reput • Ruda • Sebešić • Seona • Sinokos • Stojkovići • Šenkovići • Torine • Trenica • Trnovac • Turalići • Vejzovići • Vodovod • Zenepići • Zubići

== Odžak (FBiH) ==
Ada • Donja Dubica • Donji Svilaj • Gnionica • Gornja Dubica • Gornji Svilaj • Novi Grad • Novo Selo* • Odžak • Posavska Mahala • Potočani* • Srnava* • Vrbovac

=== Vukosavlje (RS) ===
Ada* • Gnionica • Jakeš • Jošavica • Modrički Lug • Pećnik • Potočani* • Srnava*

== Olovo ==
Ajdinovići • Arapovača • Bakići • Berisalići • Boganovići • Brda • Bukov Do • Čude • Čuništa • Dolovi • Drecelj • Dugandžići • Glavično • Gornji Drapnići • Grabovica • Gurdići • Jelaške • Kamensko • Klinčići • Kolakovići • Kovačići • Krajišići • Križevići • Kruševo • Lišci • Magulica • Metilji • Milankovići • Olovo • Olovske Luke • Petrovići • Ponijerka • Ponor • Prgoševo • Pušino Polje • Radačići • Rečica • Rijeka • Slivnje • Solun • Stojčići • Šaševci • Vukotići • Žunova

== Orašje ==
Bok • Bukova Greda • Donja Mahala • Kopanice • Kostrč • Matići • Orašje • Tolisa • Ugljara • Vidovice

=== Donji Žabar (RS) ===
Čović Polje • Donji Žabar • Jenjić • Lepnica • Lončari • Oštra Luka

== Posušje ==
Bare • Batin • Broćanac • Čitluk • Gradac • Konjsko • Osoje • Podbila • Poklečani • Posušje • Rastovača • Sutina • Tribistovo • Vinjani • Vir • Vrpolje • Vučipolje • Zagorje • Zavelim

== Prijedor ==
Ališići • Babići • Bistrica • Bišćani • Božići • Brđani • Brezičani • Briševo • Busnovi • Cikote • Crna Dolina • Čarakovo • Čejreci • Čirkin Polje • Ćela • Dera • Donja Dragotinja • Donja Ravska • Donji Garevci • Donji Orlovci • Donji Volar • Gaćani • Gomjenica • Gornja Dragotinja • Gornja Jutrogošta • Gornja Puharska • Gornja Ravska • Gornji Garevci • Gornji Jelovac • Gornji Orlovci • Gornji Volar • Gradina • Hambarine • Hrnići • Jaruge • Jelićka • Jugovci • Kalajevo • Kamičani • Kevljani • Kozarac • Kozaruša • Krivaja • Lamovita • Ljeskare • Ljubija • Malo Palančište • Marićka • Marini • Miljakovci • Miska Glava • Niševići • Ništavci • Omarska • Orlovača • Pejići • Petrov Gaj • Prijedor • Rakelići • Rakovčani • Raljaš • Rasavci • Rizvanovići • Saničani • Šurkovac • Tisova • Tomašica • Trnopolje • Veliko Palančište • Zecovi • Žune

== Prnjavor ==
Babanovci • Brezik • Crkvena • Čivčije • Čorle • Doline • Donja Ilova • Donja Mravica • Donji Galjipovci • Donji Palačkovci • Donji Smrtići • Donji Štrpci • Donji Vijačani • Drenova • Gajevi • Galjipovci • Gornja Ilova • Gornja Mravica • Gornji Galjipovci • Gornji Palačkovci • Gornji Smrtići • Gornji Štrpci • Gornji Vijačani (dio) • Grabik Ilova • Gusak • Hrvaćani • Husrpovci • Jadovica • Jasik • Kokori • Konjuhovci • Karać • Kremna • Kulaši • Lišnja • Lužani • Maćino Brdo • Mračaj • Mravica • Mujinci • Naseobina Babanovci • Naseobina Hrvaćani • Naseobina Lišnja • Novo Selo • Okolica • Orašje • Otpočivaljka • Paramije • Pečeneg Ilova • Popovići • Potočani • Prnjavor • Prosjek • Puraći • Ralutinac • Ratkovac • Skakavci • Šarinci • Šereg Ilova • Šibovska • Štivor • Velika Ilova • Vršani

== Prozor-Rama ==
Blace • Borovnica • Dobroša • Donja Vast • Donji Krančići • Donji Višnjani • Družinovići • Duge • Gmići • Gorica • Gornji Krančići • Gornji Višnjani • Gračac • Gračanica • Grevići • Heljdovi • Here • Hudutsko • Ivanci • Jaklići • Klek • Kovačevo Polje • Kozo • Kućani • Kute • Lapsunj • Lizoperci • Lug • Ljubunci • Maglice • Meopotočje • Mluša • Ometala • Orašac • Pajići • Paljike • Parcani • Paroš • Ploča • Podbor • Proslap • Prozor • Ravnica • Ripci • Rumboci • Skrobućani • Šćipe • Šćit • Šerovina • Šlimac • Tošćanica • Trišćani • Ustirama • Uzdol • Varvara • Zahum

== Rogatica ==
Agarovići • Babljak • Beći • Begzadići • Beheći • Berkovići • Bjelogorci • Blažujevići • Borač • Borika • Borovac • Borovsko • Božine • Brankovići • Brčigovo • Brda • Brezje • Bulozi • Burati • Čadovina • Čavčići • Čubrići • Dobrače • Dobrašina • Dobromerovići • Dobrouščići • Drobnići • Dub • Dumanjići • Đedovići • Ferizovići • Gazije • Godomilje • Golubovići • Grivci • Gučevo • Guždelji • Jarovići • Jasenice • Kamen • Karačići • Kopljevići • Kovanj • Kozarde • Kozići • Kramer Selo • Krvojevići • Kujundžijevići • Kukavice • Kusuci • Lađevine • Laze • Lepenica • Lubardići • Ljubomišlje • Mahala • Maravići • Medna Luka • Mesići • Mislovo • Mrgudići • Nahota • Obrtići • Okruglo • Orahovo • Osovo • Otričevo • Pašić Kula • Pavičina Kula • Pešurići • Pijevčići • Planje • Pljesko • Plješevica • Podgaj • Pokrivenik • Pribošijevići • Pripećak • Prosječeno • Purtići • Radič • Rađevići • Rakitnica • Ribioc • Rogatica • Rusanovići • Seljani • Sjemeć • Sjeversko • Slap • Sočice • Stara Gora • Starčići • Stari Brod • Stjenice • Stop • Strmac • Sudići • Surovići • Šatorovići • Šena Krena • Šetići • Šljedovići • Šljivno • Štavanj • Trnovo • Varošište • Vragolovi • Vratar • Vražalice • Vrelo • Vrlazje • Zagajevi • Zagorice • Zakomo • Ziličina • Žepa • Živaljevići • Živaljevina

== Rudo ==
Arbanasi • Arsići • Bare • Bijelo Brdo • Biševići • Bjelugovina • Bjelušine • Bjeljevine • Blizna • Boranovići • Bovan • Božovići • Budalice • Cvrkote • Čavdari • Danilovići • Dolovi • Donja Rijeka • Donja Strmica • Donje Cikote • Donji Ravanci • Dorići • Dubac • Dugovječ • Džihanići • Gaočići • Gojava • Gornja Rijeka • Gornja Strmica • Gornje Cikote • Gornji Ravanci • Grabovik • Grivin • Janjići • Knjeginja • Kosovići • Kovači • Kula • Ljutava • Međurečje • Mikavice • Mioče • Misajlovina • Mokronozi • Mrsovo • Nikolići • Obrvena • Omačina • Omarine • Oputnica • Orah • Oskoruša • Past • Pazalje • Peljevići • Petačine • Plema • Pohare • Polimlje • Popov Do • Prebidoli • Pribišići • Prijevorac • Radoželje • Rakovići • Ravne Njive • Resići • Rudo • Rupavci • Setihovo • Sokolovići • Stankovača • Staro Rudo • Strgači • Strgačina • Šahdani • Štrpci • Trbosilje • Trnavci • Trnavci kod Rudog • Ustibar • Uvac • Vagan • Viti Grab • Zagrađe • Zarbovina • Zlatari • Zubač • Zubanj

== Sanski Most (FBiH) ==
Batkovci • Bjeline • Bojište • Bosanski Milanovac • Bošnjaci • Brdari • Budimlić Japra • Čaplje • Demiševci • Donja Kozica • Donja Tramošnja • Donji Dabar • Donji Kamengrad • Donji Lipnik • Duge Njive • Dževar • Đedovača • Đurići • Fajtovci • Garevica • Glavice • Gorice • Gornja Kozica • Gornja Tramošnja • Gornji Dabar • Gornji Kamengrad • Gornji Lipnik • Grdanovci • Hadrovci • Halilovci • Hazići • Hrustovo • Husimovci • Ilidža • Jelašinovci • Kijevo • Kljevci • Koprivna • Kozin • Krkojevci • Kruhari • Lukavice • Lušci Palanka • Lužani • Majkić Japra Donja • Majkić Japra Gornja • Marini • Miljevci • Modra • Mrkalji • Naprelje • Okreč • Oštra Luka • Otiš • Ovanjska • Podbriježje • Podlug • Podovi • Podvidača • Poljak • Praštali • Sanski Most • Sasina • Skucani Vakuf • Slatina • Stara Rijeka • Stari Majdan • Suhača • Šehovci • Škrljevita • Tomina • Trnova • Usorci • Vrhpolje • Zenkovići

== Sokolac ==
Baltići • Banja Lučica • Banjani • Barnik • Bećari • Bereg • Bijela Voda • Bjelasovići • Bjelosavljevići • Borovac • Brejakovići • Bukovik • Cvrčići • Čavarine • Čitluci • Donje Babine • Donje Gire • Donji Drapnići • Donji Kalimanići • Džindići • Đedovci • Gazivode • Gornji Kalimanići • Gornji Poretak • Grbići • Hrastišta • Imamovići • Jabuka • Jasik • Kadića Brdo • Kalauzovići • Kaljina • Kazmerići • Klečkovac • Knežina • Košutica • Kruševci • Kula • Kusače • Kuti • Mandra • Mangurići • Margetići • Medojevići • Meljine • Mičivode • Miletci • Miletine • Nehorići • Nepravdići • Novo Selo • Novoseoci • Ozerkovići • Parževići • Pavičići • Pediše • Pihlice • Pobratci • Podkrajeva • Podromanija • Preljubovići • Prinčići • Pusto Selo • Ravna Romanija • Rijeća • Rudine • Selišta • Sijerci • Smrtići • Sokolac • Sokolovići • Šahbegovići • Šenkovići • Širijevići • Točionik • Turkovići • Vidrići • Vraneši • Vrapci • Vražići • Vrhbarje • Vrhovina • Vrutci • Vukosavljevići • Zagrađe • Žljebovi • Žulj • Žunovi

== Srbac ==
Bajinci • Bardača • Bosanski Kobaš • Brezovljani • Brusnik • Crnaja • Ćukali • Donja Lepenica • Donji Kladari • Donji Srđevići • Dugo Polje • Gaj • Glamočani • Gornja Lepenica • Gornji Kladari • Gornji Srđevići • Ilićani • Inađol • Kaoci • Korovi • Kukulje • Lilić • Nova Ves • Novi Martinac • Nožičko • Povelič • Prijebljezi • Rakovac • Razboj Ljevčanski • Razboj Župski • Resavac • Seferovci • Selište • Sitneši • Sitneši Mali • Srbac • Srbac • Stari Martinac • Vlaknica

== Srebrenica ==
Babuljice • Bajramovići • Beširevići • Blažijevići • Bostahovine • Božići • Brakovci • Brezovice • Brežani • Bučinovići • Bučje • Bujakovići • Crvica • Čičevci • Dimnići • Dobrak • Donji Potočari • Fojhar • Gaj • Gladovići • Gođevići • Gornji Potočari • Gostilj • Kalimanići • Karačići • Klotjevac • Kostolomci • Krnjići • Krušev Do • Kutuzero • Liješće • Likari • Lipovac • Luka • Ljeskovik • Mala Daljegošta • Međe • Miholjevine • Milačevići • Moćevići • Nogačevići • Obadi • Opetci • Orahovica • Osatica • Osmače • Osredak • Pale • Palež • Peći • Pećišta • Petriča • Podgaj • Podosoje • Podravno • Postolje • Poznanovići • Pribidoli • Pribojevići • Prohići • Pusmulići • Radoševići • Radovčići • Rađenovići • Ratkovići • Sase • Skelani • Skenderovići • Slatina • Srebrenica • Staroglavice • Sućeska • Sulice • Šubin • Tokoljak • Toplica • Urisići • Velika Daljegošta • Viogor • Žabokvica • Žedanjsko

== Srebrenik ==
Babunovići • Behrami • Brda • Brezik • Brnjičani • Cage • Cerik • Crveno Brdo • Čekanići • Ćehaje • Ćojlučko Polje • Ćojluk • Dedići • Donji Moranjci • Donji Podpeć • Donji Srebrenik • Duboki Potok • Falešići • Gornji Hrgovi • Gornji Moranjci • Gornji Podpeć • Gornji Srebrenik • Huremi • Jasenica • Ježinac • Kiseljak • Kuge • Like • Lipje • Lisovići • Luka • Ljenobud • Maoča • Podorašje • Rapatnica • Seona • Sladna • Srebrenik • Straža • Šahmeri • Špionica Centar • Špionica Donja • Špionica Gornja • Špionica Srednja • Tinja Donja • Tinja Gornja • Tutnjevac • Uroža • Zahirovići

== Stanari ==
Brestovo • Cerovica • Cvrtkovci • Dragalovci • Jelanjska • Ljeb • Mitrovići • Osredak • Ostružnja Donja • Ostružnja Gornja • Radnja Donja • Raškovci • Stanari

== Stolac (FBiH) ==
Aladinići • Barane • Bjelojevići • Borojevići • Burmazi • Crnići - Greda • Crnići - Kula • Do • Hodovo • Hrgud • Komanje Brdo • Kozice • Kruševo • Ošanjići • Pješivac - Greda • Pješivac - Kula • Poprati • Prenj • Rotimlja • Stolac • Trijebanj

=== Berkovići (RS) ===
• Berkovići • Bitunja • Brštanik • Dabrica • Do • Hatelji • Hodovo • Hrgud • Ljubljenica • Ljuti Do • Meča • Poplat • Predolje • Strupići • Suzina • Šćepan Krst • Trusina • Žegulja

== Šamac ==
Batkuša • Crkvina • Donja Slatina • Donji Hasić • Gajevi • Gornja Slatina • Gornji Hasić • Kornica • Kruškovo Polje • Novo Selo • Obudovac • Pisari • Prud • Srednja Slatina • Šamac • Škarić • Zasavica

=== Domaljevac-Šamac (FBiH) ===
Bazik • Domaljevac • Brvnik • Grebnice • Tišina

== Šekovići ==
Akmačići • Ašćerići • Bašići • Betanj • Bobari • Čanići • Dobrić • Džanojevići • Đurići • Javor • Kalabače • Kaštijelj • Korijen • Markovići • Milovanovići • Papraća • Petrovići • Plazače • Pobedarje • Podpola • Raševo • Selište • Strmica • Stupari • Sučani • Šekovići • Tepen • Trnovo • Tupanari • Udbina • Velika Njiva • Vidakovići • Vrelo • Zupci

== Šipovo ==
Babići • Babin Do • Bešnjevo • Brđani • Brdo • Čifluk • Čuklić • Donji Mujdžići • Dragnić • Dragnić Podovi • Duljci • Đukići • Gorica • Gornji Mujdžići • Grbavica • Greda • Jusići • Kneževići • Kozila • Krčevine • Lipovača • Lubovo • Lužine • Ljuša • Majevac • Močioci • Natpolje • Olići • Podobzir • Podosoje • Popuže • Pribeljci • Sarići • Sokolac • Stupna • Šipovo • Todorići • Vagan • Vodica • Volari • Vražić

== Široki Brijeg ==
Biograci • Buhovo • Crne Lokve • Čerigaj • Dobrič • Dobrkovići • Doci • Donja Britvica • Donji Crnač • Donji Gradac • Duboko Mokro • Dužice • Gornja Britvica • Gornji Crnač • Gornji Gradac • Gornji Mamići • Grabova Draga • Izbično • Jare • Knešpolje • Kočerin • Lise • Ljubotići • Ljuti Dolac • Oklaji • Podvranić • Potkraj • Pribinovići • Privalj • Rasno • Rujan • Široki Brijeg • Trn • Turčinovići • Uzarići

== Teslić ==
Banja Vrućica • Bardaci • Barići • Bijelo Bučje • Blatnica • Brić • Buletić • Čečava • Donji Očauš • Donji Ranković • Donji Ružević • Dubrave • Đulići • Gomjenica • Gornja Radnja • Gornja Vrućica • Gornje Liplje • Gornji Očauš • Gornji Ranković • Gornji Ružević • Gornji Teslić • Jasenova • Jezera • Kamenica • Komušina Donja • Komušina Gornja • Kuzmani • Mladikovine • Osivica • Parlozi • Pribinić • Radešići • Rajševa • Rastuša • Rudo Polje • Slatina • Stenjak • Studenci • Šnjegotina Gornja • Teslić • Ugodnovići • Ukrinica • Vitkovci • Vlajići • Žarkovina

== Tešanj ==
Blaževci • Bobare • Bukva • Cerovac • Čaglići • Čifluk • Dobropolje • Drinčići • Džimilić Planje • Jablanica • Jelah • Jelah - Polje • Jevadžije • Kalošević • Karadaglije • Koprivci • Kraševo • Lepenica • Logobare • Lončari • Ljetinić • Medakovo • Mekiš • Miljanovci • Mrkotić • Novi Miljanovci • Novo Selo • Omanjska • Orašje Planje • Piljužići • Potočani • Putešić • Raduša • Ripna • Rosulje • Šije • Tešanj • Tešanjka • Trepče • Tugovići • Vrela • Vukovo

== Tomislavgrad ==
Baljci • Blažuj • Bogdašić • Borčani • Bukova Gora • Bukovica • Cebara • Crvenice • Ćavarov Stan • Dobrići • Donji Brišnik • Eminovo Selo • Galečić • Gornja Prisika • Gornji Brišnik • Grabovica • Jošanica • Kazaginac • Kolo • Kongora • Korita • Kovači • Krnjin • Kuk • Letka • Lipa • Liskovača • Lug • Mandino Selo • Mesihovina • Mijakovo Polje • Mokronoge • Mrkodol • Omerovići • Omolje • Oplećani • Pasič • Podgaj • Prisoje • Radoši • Rašćani • Rašeljke • Renići • Roško Polje • Rošnjače • Sarajlije • Seonica • Srđani • Stipanjići • Šuica • Tomislavgrad • Vedašić • Vinica • Vojkovići • Vranjače • Vrilo • Zaljiće • Zaljut • Zidine

== Travnik ==
Bačvice • Bandol • Bijelo Bučje • Bilići • Brajići • Brajkovići • Brankovac • Čifluk • Čosići • Čukle • Dolac • Dolac na Lašvi • Donja Trebeuša • Donje Krčevine • Donji Korićani • Dub • Đelilovac • Fazlići • Gladnik • Gluha Bukovica • Goleš • Gornja Trebeuša • Gornje Krčevine • Gornji Korićani • Gradina • Grahovčići • Grahovik • Guča Gora • Hamandžići • Han Bila • Jezerci • Kljaci • Kokošari • Komar • Kraljevice • Krpeljići • Kula • Kundići • Lovrići • Mala Bukovica • Maline • Miletići • Miškića Brdo • Mosor • Mudrike • Nova Bila • Orahovo • Orašac • Orlice • Ovčarevo • Paklarevo • Podkraj • Podovi • Podstinje • Pokrajčići • Poljanice • Polje Slavka Gavrančića • Prići • Pulac • Putićevo • Radića Brdo • Radojčići • Radonjići • Ričice • Runjići • Sažići • Sečevo • Seferi • Selići • Skomorje • Slimena • Suhi Dol • Šešići • Šipovik • Šišava • Travnik • Turbe • Turići • Varošluk • Velika Bukovica • Vidoševići • Vilenica • Višnjevo • Vitovlje • Vlahovići • Vranići • Zagrađe • Zaselje

== Trebinje (RS) ==
Aranđelovo • Arbanaška • Arslanagića Most • Baonine • Begović Kula • Bihovo • Bijelač • Bijograd • Bioci • Bodiroge • Bogojević Selo • Borilovići • Brani Do • Brova • Budoši • Bugovina • Cerovac • Cicina • Čvarići • Desin Selo • Diklići • Do • Dobromani • Dodanovići • Dolovi • Domaševo • Donja Kočela • Donje Čičevo • Donje Grančarevo • Donje Vrbno • Donji Orahovac • Dračevo • Dražin Do • Drijenjani • Dubljani • Dubočani • Duži • Đedići • Glavinići • Gojšina • Gola Glavica • Gomiljani • Gornja Kočela • Gornje Čičevo • Gornje Grančarevo • Gornje Vrbno • Gornji Orahovac • Grab • Grbeši • Grbići • Grkavci • Grmljani • Hum • Janjač • Jasen • Jasenica Lug • Jazina • Jušići • Klikovići • Klobuk • Konjsko • Korlati • Kotezi • Kovačina • Kraj • Krajkovići • Kremeni Do • Krnjevići • Kučići • Kunja Glavica • Kutina • Lapja • Lastva • Lokvice • Lomači • Lug • Lušnica • Ljekova • Ljubovo • Marić Međine • Mesari • Mionići • Morče • Mosko • Mrkonjići • Mrnjići • Necvijeće • Nevada • Nikontovići • Ograde • Orašje Popovo • Orašje Površ • Orašje Zubci • Parojska Njiva • Petrovići • Pijavice • Podosoje • Podštirovnik • Podstrašivica • Podvori • Poljice Čičevo • Poljice Popovo • Prhinje • Pridvorci • Prosjek • Rapti Bobani • Rapti Zupci • Rasovac • Sedlari • Skočigrm • Staro Slano • Strujići • Šarani • Šćenica Ljubomir • Taleža • Todorići • Trebijovi • Trebinje • Tuli • Tulje • Turani • Turica • Turmenti • Tvrdoš • Ubla • Ugarci • Ukšići • Uskoplje • Uvjeća • Veličani • Velja Gora • Vladušići • Vlasače • Vlaška • Volujac • Vrpolje Ljubomir • Vrpolje Zagora • Vučija • Vukovići • Zagora • Zagradinje • Zgonjevo • Žakovo • Ždrijelovići • Željevo • Župa

=== Ravno (FBiH) ===
Baljivac • Belenići • Bobovišta • Čavaš • Cicrina • Čopice • Čvaljina • Diklići • Dvrsnica • Glavska • Golubinac • Gorogaše • Grebci • Ivanica • Kalađurđevići • Kijev Do • Nenovići • Orah • Orahov Do • Ravno • Rupni Do • Šćenica Bobani • Slavogostići • Slivnica Bobani • Slivnica Površ • Sparožići • Trebimlja • Trnčina • Velja Međa • Vlaka • Začula • Zaplanik • Zavala

== Tuzla ==
Brđani • Breške • Breze • Brgule • Bukinje • Cerik • Cviljevina • Čaklovići Donji • Čaklovići Gornji • Čanići • Dobrnja • Dokanj • Dragunja Donja • Dragunja Gornja • Gornja Tuzla • Grabovica Donja • Grabovica Gornja • Hudeč • Husino • Kiseljak • Kolimer • Kolovrat • Konjikovići • Kosci • Kovačevo Selo • Kovačica • Krtolije • Kukovina • Lipnica • Lipnica Donja • Lipnica Gornja • Lipnica Srednja • Ljepunice • Ljubače • Marinkovići • Mihatovići • Milešići • Morančani • Mramor • Mramor Novi • Obodnica Donja • Obodnica Gornja • Orašje • Osoje • Par Selo Gornje • Pasci Donji • Pasci Gornji • Petrovice Donje • Petrovice Gornje • Plane • Pogorioci • Poljana • Potraš • Požarnica • Rapače • Rasovac • Simin Han • Snoz • Svojtina • Ševar • Šići • Šićki Brod • Tetima • Tisovac • Tuzla • Vršani

== Ugljevik (RS) ==
Atmačići • Bilalići • Bogutovo Selo • Donja Krćina • Donja Trnova • Glinje • Gornja Krćina • Gornja Trnova • Janjari • Jasenje • Jasikovac • Korenita • Maleševci • Mezgraja • Mukat - Stankovići • Ravno Polje • Sarije • Sniježnica • Srednja Trnova • Stari Teočak • Stari Ugljevik • Teočak – Krstac • Tursunovo Brdo • Tutnjevac • Ugljevička Obrijež • Ugljevik • Zabrđe

== Usora ==
Alibegovci • Bejići • Sivša • Srednja Omanjska • Ularice • Žabljak

== Vareš ==
Bijelo Borje • Blaža • Borovica Donja • Borovica Gornja • Borovičke Njive • Brda • Brezik • Brgule • Budoželje • Čamovine • Ćeće • Dabravine • Daštansko • Debela Međa • Diknjići • Dragovići • Draževići • Duboštica • Hodžići • Ivančevo • Javornik • Kadarići • Karići • Kokoščići • Kolovići • Kopališta • Kopijari • Krčevine • Kunosići • Letevci • Ligatići • Luke • Ljepovići • Mijakovići • Mir • Mižnovići • Mlakve • Naseoci • Neprivaj • Oćevija • Okruglica • Orah • Osoje • Osredak • Ostrlja • Pajtov Han • Pajtovići • Planinica • Pobilje • Podjavor • Pogar • Položac • Poljanice • Pomenići • Pržići • Pržići Kolonija • Radonjići • Radoševići • Ravne • Rokoč • Samari • Semizova Ponikva • Seoci • Sjenokos • Slavin • Sršljenci • Strica • Striježevo • Stupni Do • Šikulje • Tisovci • Toljenak • Tribija • Vareš • Vareš Majdan • Vijaka Donja • Vijaka Gornja • Višnjići • Zabrezje • Zaruđe • Zubeta • Zvijezda • Žalja • Žižci

== Velika Kladuša ==
Bosanska Bojna • Brda • Bukovlje • Crvarevac • Čaglica • Čelinja • Dolovi • Donja Slapnica • Donja Vidovska • Elezovići • Glavica • Glinica • Golubovići • Gornja Slapnica • Gornja Vidovska • Grabovac • Gradina • Grahovo • Johovica • Klupe • Kudići • Kumarica • Mala Kladuša • Marjanovac • Miljkovići • Mrcelji • Nepeke • Orčeva Luka • Podzvizd • Poljana • Polje • Ponikve • Rajnovac • Stabandža • Šabići • Šestanovac • Šiljkovača • Šmrekovac • Šumatac • Todorovo • Todorovska Slapnica • Trn • Trnovi • Vejinac • Velika Kladuša • Vrnograč • Vrnogračka Slapnica • Zagrad • Zborište

== Visoko ==
Arnautovići • Bare • Bešići • Biskupići • Bradve • Brezovik • Buci • Bulčići • Buzić Mahala • Buzići • Čakalovići • Čekrčići • Čifluk • Ćatići • Dautovci • Dobrinje • Dobro • Dobro Selo • Dol • Dolipolje • Dolovi • Donja Vratnica • Donja Zimća • Donje Moštre • Dvor • Džindići • Ginje • Goduša • Gorani • Gornja Vratnica • Gornja Zimća • Gornje Moštre • Grad • Grajani • Grđevac • Hadžići • Hlapčevići • Jelašje • Kalići • Kalotići • Koložići • Kondžilo • Kopači • Kula Banjer • Liješeva • Lisovo • Loznik • Lužnica • Mali Trnovci • Malo Čajno • Maurovići • Mladoš • Muhašinovići • Mulići • Okolišće • Orašac • Ozrakovići • Paljike • Podvinjci • Podvinje • Poklečići • Poriječani • Radinovići • Rajčići • Ramadanovci • Ratkovci • Seoča • Smršnica • Srhinje • Stuparići • Svinjarevo • Šošnje • Taukčići • Topuzovo Polje • Tramošnjik • Tujlići • Tušnjići • Upovac • Uvorići • Veliko Čajno • Veruša • Vidovići • Vilenjak • Visoko • Vrela • Zagorice • Zagornica • Zbilje

== Višegrad ==
Ajdinovići • Babin Potok • Ban Polje • Barimo • Batkovica • Batkušići • Bijela • Biljezi • Bistrivode • Bjegovići • Bjeljajci • Blace • Blaž • Bodežnik • Bogdašići • Bogilice • Borovac • Brezje • Brodar • Bursići • Crijep • Crnčići • Crni Vrh • Čengići • Češalj • Ćaćice • Dobrunska Rijeka • Donja Brštanica • Donja Crnča • Donja Jagodina • Donja Lijeska • Donje Dubovo • Donje Štitarevo • Donje Vardište • Donji Dobrun • Donji Dubovik • Dragomilje • Drina • Drinsko • Drokan • Dubočica • Dušče • Džankići • Đipi • Đurevići • Faljenovići • Gazibare • Glogova • Gornja Brštanica • Gornja Crnča • Gornja Jagodina • Gornja Lijeska • Gornje Dubovo • Gornje Štitarevo • Gornji Dobrun • Gornji Dubovik • Granje • Greben • Hadrovići • Haluge • Hamzići • Han Brdo • Holijaci • Holijačka Luka • Hranjevac • Jablanica • Jarci • Jelačići • Jelašci • Jelići • Jezernice • Kabernik • Kamenica • Kapetanovići • Klašnik • Klisura • Kočarim • Kopito • Koritnik • Kosovo Polje • Kragujevac • Kuka • Kupusovići • Kurtalići • Kustur Polje • Lasci • Loznica • Macute • Madžarevići • Mala Gostilja • Mangalin Han • Masali • Međeđa • Međuselje • Menzilovići • Meremišlje • Miloševići • Mirlovići • Mramorice • Mušići • Nebogovine • Nezuci • Obravnje • Odžak • Okolišta • Okrugla • Omerovići • Oplave • Orahovci • Palež • Paočići • Pijavice • Podgorje • Poljanice • Polje • Povjestača • Pozderčići • Prelovo • Presjeka • Pretiša • Prisoje • Raonići • Repuševići • Resnik • Rijeka • Rodić Brdo • Rohci • Rujišta • Rutenovići • Rzav • Sase • Sendići • Smriječje • Staniševac • Stolac • Stražbenice • Šeganje • Šip • Šumice • Trševine • Tupeši • Turjak • Tusta Međ • Tvrtkovići • Ubava • Uništa • Ušće Lima • Veletovo • Velika Gostilja • Velje Polje • Velji Lug • Višegrad • Višegradska Banja • Vlahovići • Vodenice • Vučine • Zagorac • Zakrsnica • Zanožje • Zemljice • Zlatnik • Žagre • Žlijeb

== Vitez ==
Ahmići • Bila • Brdo • Bukve • Divjak • Donja Večeriska • Dubravica • Gaćice • Gornja Večeriska • Jardol • Kratine • Krčevine • Krtine • Krušćica • Lupac • Ljubić • Mali Mošunj • Nadioci • Pirići • Počulica • Preočica • Prnjavor • Putkovići • Rijeka • Sadovače • Sivrino Selo • Šantići • Tolovići • Veliki Mošunj • Vitez • Vraniska • Vrhovine • Zabilje • Zaselje

== Vlasenica ==
Bakići • Brda • Cerska • Dragaševac • Drum • Durakovići • Durići • Džemat • Gobelje • Grabovica • Gradina • Jasen • Klještani • Kojčevina • Kozja Ravan • Kulina • Kuljančići • Majstorovići • Mišari • Mršići • Neđeljišta • Odžak • Peševina • Pijuke • Plakalovići • Podcrkvina • Pustoše • Rača • Rašića Gaj • Rogosija • Simići • Šadići Donji • Šadići Gornji • Tikvarići • Tugovo • Turalići • Vlasenica • Vrli Kraj

== Zavidovići ==
Alići • Bajvati • Biljačići • Borovnica • Crnjevo • Čardak • Činovići • Debelo Brdo • Dišica • Dolac • Dolina • Donja Lovnica • Donji Junuzovići • Dragovac • Dubravica • Džebe • Gare • Gornje Selo • Gornji Junuzovići • Grabovica • Gostovići • Hajderovići • Hrge • Kamenica • Karačić • Krivaja • Kućice • Lijevča • Mahoje • Majdan • Miljevići • Mitrovići • Mustajbašići • Osječani • Perovići • Podvolujak • Potkleče • Predražići • Priluk • Ribnica (part of settlement) • Ridžali • Rujnica • Skroze • Suha • Svinjašnica • Vozuća • Vrbica • Vukmanovići • Vukovine • Zavidovići

== Zenica ==
Arnauti • Banloz • Bijele Vode • Bistrica • Bistrica Gornja • Briznik • Bukovica • Dobriljevo • Donja Vraca • Donji Čajdraš • Drugavci • Dusina • Gladovići • Gorica • Gornja Gračanica • Gornja Višnjica • Gornja Vraca • Gornja Zenica • Gornji Čajdraš • Gradina • Gradišće • Grm • Gumanci • Janjac • Janjići • Janjićki Vrh • Jasika • Jastrebac • Jurjevići • Kasapovići • Klopački Vrh • Kolići • Koprivna • Kovačići • Kovanići • Kozarci • Kula • Lašva • Lijeske • Lokvine • Loznik • Ljubetovo • Mošćanica • Mutnica • Nemila • Novo Selo • Obrenovci • Orahovica • Osojnica • Osredak • Palinovići • Pepelari • Peševići • Plahovići • Plavčići • Poca • Pojske • Ponihovo • Ponirak • Puhovac • Putovičko Polje • Putovići • Radinovići • Sebuja • Smajići • Starina • Stranjani • Sviće • Šerići • Šiblići • Tišina • Topčić Polje • Trešnjeva Glava • Vranduk • Vranovići • Vražale • Vrhpolje • Vukotići • Zahići • Zenica • Živkovići

== Zvornik ==
Androvići • Baljkovica Donja • Boškovići • Buložani • Čelopek • Divič • Donja Pilica • Donji Lokanj • Drinjača • Dugi Dio • Đevanje • Đulići • Glodi • Glumina • Gornja Pilica • Gornji Lokanj • Grbavci Donji • Grbavci Gornji • Gušteri • Jardan • Jasenica • Jusići • Kamenica Donja • Kamenica Gornja • Kiseljak • Kitovnice • Klisa • Kostijerevo • Kozluk • Kraljevići • Križevići • Kučić Kula • Kula Grad • Liješanj • Liplje • Malešići • Marčići • Mehmedići • Novo Selo • Pađine • Paljevići • Petkovci • Potočani • Roćević • Rožanj • Sapna • Skočić • Snagovo • Snagovo Donje • Snagovo Gornje • Sopotnik • Šepak Donji • Šepak Gornji • Šetići • Tabanci • Trnovica • Tršić • Ugljari • Vrela • Zelinje • Zvornik

=== Sapna (FBiH) ===
Baljkovica • Goduš • Hanđelići • Kobilići • Kovačevići • Međeđa • Nezuk • Rastošnica • Selimovići • Skakovica • Vitinica • Zaseok

== Žepče ==
Adže • Begov Han • Bistrica • Bljuva • Brankovići • Čusto Brdo • Donji Lug • Globarica • Goliješnica • Golubinja • Gornja Golubinja • Gornja Lovnica • Gornji Lug • Grabovica • Komšići • Lupoglav • Ljeskovica • Ljubatovići • Ljubna • Matina • Mračaj • Orahovica • Osova • Ozimica • Papratnica • Pire • Ponijevo • Radunice • Ravne Donje • Ravne Gornje • Selište • Tatarbudžak • Varošište • Vašarište • Vinište • Vitlaci • Želeće • Željezno Polje • Žepče

== Živinice ==
Bašigovci • Brnjica • Djedino • Dubrave Donje • Dubrave Gornje • Dunajevići • Đurđevik • Gračanica • Kovači • Kršići • Kuljan • Lukavica Donja • Lukavica Gornja • Odorovići • Priluk • Spreča • Suha • Svojat • Šerići • Tupković Donji • Tupković Gornji • Višća Donja • Višća Gornja • Vrnojevići • Zelenika • Zukići • Živinice • Živinice Donje • Živinice Gornje

== See also ==
- List of settlements in the Federation of Bosnia and Herzegovina
- List of cities in Bosnia and Herzegovina
- Municipalities of Bosnia and Herzegovina
- Municipalities of Republika Srpska
