= Zagoni (Bijeljina) =

Zagoni Загони (Serbian)
- Village (Selo)
- Location within Bosnia and Herzegovina
- Coordinates: 44°43′16″N 19°05′50″E
- Country: Bosnia and Herzegovina
- Entity: Republika Srpska
- Municipality: Bijeljina
- Time zone: UTC+1 (CET)
  - Summer (DST): UTC+2 (CEST)

Zagoni (Serbian Cyrillic: Загони) is a village in the municipality of Bijeljina, Republika Srpska, Bosnia and Herzegovina.
