= Mramor Novi =

- Village
- Location within Bosnia and Herzegovina
- Coordinates: 44.5760202°N 18.5552644°E
- Country: Bosnia and Herzegovina
- Entity: Federation of Bosnia and Herzegovina
- Canton: Tuzla
- Municipality: Tuzla

Area
  - Total: 1.12 sq mi (2.91 km^{2})

Population (2013)
  - Total: 1,344
  - Density: 1,200/sq mi (462/km^{2})
- Time zone: UTC+1 (CET)
  - Summer (DST): UTC+2 (CEST)

Mramor Novi is a village in the municipality of Tuzla, Tuzla Canton, Bosnia and Herzegovina.

== Demographics ==
According to the 2013 census, its population was 1,344.

Ethnicity in 2013
Ethnicity	Number	Percentage
Bosniaks	1,135	84.4%
Serbs	51	3.8%
Croats	38	2.8%
other/undeclared	120	8.9%
Total	1,344	100%
