= Pločnik (Doboj) =

Pločnik Плочник
- Village
- Location within Bosnia and Herzegovina
- Coordinates: 44°45′21″N 18°03′12″E
- Country: Bosnia and Herzegovina
- Entity: Republika Srpska
- Municipality: Doboj
- Time zone: UTC+1 (CET)
  - Summer (DST): UTC+2 (CEST)

Pločnik (Cyrillic: Плочник) is a village in the municipality of Doboj, Republika Srpska, Bosnia and Herzegovina.
