= Snoz =

- Village
- Location within Bosnia and Herzegovina
- Coordinates: 44.594532°N 18.6337978°E
- Country: Bosnia and Herzegovina
- Entity: Federation of Bosnia and Herzegovina
- Canton: Tuzla
- Municipality: Tuzla

Area
  - Total: 0.61 sq mi (1.58 km^{2})

Population (2013)
  - Total: 25
  - Density: 41/sq mi (16/km^{2})
- Time zone: UTC+1 (CET)
  - Summer (DST): UTC+2 (CEST)

Snoz is a village in the municipality of Tuzla, Tuzla Canton, Bosnia and Herzegovina.

== Demographics ==
According to the 2013 census, its population was 25.

Ethnicity in 2013
Ethnicity	Number	Percentage
Croats	24	96.0%
Serbs	1	4.0%
Total	25	100%
