= Vidoševići =

- Village
- Location within Bosnia and Herzegovina
- Coordinates: 44.221274°N 17.6146647°E
- Country: Bosnia and Herzegovina
- Entity: Federation of Bosnia and Herzegovina
- Canton: Central Bosnia
- Municipality: Travnik

Area
  - Total: 1.34 sq mi (3.46 km^{2})

Population (2013)
  - Total: 142
  - Density: 106/sq mi (41.0/km^{2})
- Time zone: UTC+1 (CET)
  - Summer (DST): UTC+2 (CEST)

Vidoševići is a village in the municipality of Travnik, Bosnia and Herzegovina.

== Demographics ==
According to the 2013 census, its population was 142.

Ethnicity in 2013
Ethnicity	Number	Percentage
Bosniaks	72	50.7%
Croats	67	47.2%
Serbs	1	0.7%
other/undeclared	2	1.4%
Total	142	100%
