= Pogorioci =

- Village
- Location within Bosnia and Herzegovina
- Coordinates: 44.5563419°N 18.576692°E
- Country: Bosnia and Herzegovina
- Entity: Federation of Bosnia and Herzegovina
- Canton: Tuzla
- Municipality: Tuzla

Area
  - Total: 1.31 sq mi (3.40 km^{2})

Population (2013)
  - Total: 374
  - Density: 285/sq mi (110/km^{2})
- Time zone: UTC+1 (CET)
  - Summer (DST): UTC+2 (CEST)

Pogorioci is a village in the municipality of Tuzla, Tuzla Canton, Bosnia and Herzegovina.

== Demographics ==
According to the 2013 census, its population was 374.

Ethnicity in 2013
Ethnicity	Number	Percentage
Croats	284	75.9%
Bosniaks	77	20.6%
Serbs	3	0.8%
other/undeclared	10	2.7%
Total	374	100%
