= Petrovice Gornje =

- Village
- Location within Bosnia and Herzegovina
- Coordinates: 44.5047095°N 18.6239642°E
- Country: Bosnia and Herzegovina
- Entity: Federation of Bosnia and Herzegovina
- Canton: Tuzla
- Municipality: Tuzla

Area
  - Total: 0.86 sq mi (2.22 km^{2})

Population (2013)
  - Total: 223
  - Density: 260/sq mi (100/km^{2})
- Time zone: UTC+1 (CET)
  - Summer (DST): UTC+2 (CEST)

Petrovice Gornje is a village in the municipality of Tuzla, Tuzla Canton, Bosnia and Herzegovina.

== Demographics ==
According to the 2013 census, its population was 223.

Ethnicity in 2013
Ethnicity	Number	Percentage
Croats	193	86.5%
Bosniaks	14	6.3%
Serbs	6	2.7%
other/undeclared	10	4.5%
Total	223	100%
