= Polje Slavka Gavrančića =

- Village
- Location within Bosnia and Herzegovina
- Coordinates: 44.2083018°N 17.6861708°E
- Country: Bosnia and Herzegovina
- Entity: Federation of Bosnia and Herzegovina
- Canton: Central Bosnia
- Municipality: Travnik

Area
  - Total: 0.25 sq mi (0.65 km^{2})

Population (2013)
  - Total: 344
  - Density: 1,400/sq mi (530/km^{2})
- Time zone: UTC+1 (CET)
  - Summer (DST): UTC+2 (CEST)

Polje Slavka Gavrančića is a village in the municipality of Travnik, Bosnia and Herzegovina.

== Demographics ==
According to the 2013 census, its population was 344.

Ethnicity in 2013
Ethnicity	Number	Percentage
Croats	170	49.4%
Bosniaks	163	47.4%
Serbs	2	0.6%
other/undeclared	9	2.6%
Total	344	100%
