= Petrovice Donje =

- Village
- Location within Bosnia and Herzegovina
- Coordinates: 44.4924112°N 18.6279679°E
- Country: Bosnia and Herzegovina
- Entity: Federation of Bosnia and Herzegovina
- Canton: Tuzla
- Municipality: Tuzla

Area
  - Total: 0.69 sq mi (1.80 km^{2})

Population (2013)
  - Total: 704
  - Density: 1,010/sq mi (391/km^{2})
- Time zone: UTC+1 (CET)
  - Summer (DST): UTC+2 (CEST)

Petrovice Donje is a village in the municipality of Tuzla, Tuzla Canton, Bosnia and Herzegovina.

== Demographics ==
According to the 2013 census, its population was 704.

Ethnicity in 2013
Ethnicity	Number	Percentage
Bosniaks	654	92.9%
Croats	1	0.1%
other/undeclared	49	7.0%
Total	704	100%
