= Zemljice =

- Village
- Location within Bosnia and Herzegovina
- Coordinates: 43°57′N 19°15′E
- Country: Bosnia and Herzegovina
- Entity: Republika Srpska
- Municipality: Višegrad
- Time zone: UTC+1 (CET)
  - Summer (DST): UTC+2 (CEST)

Zemljice (Serbian: Земљице) is a village in the municipality of Višegrad, Bosnia and Herzegovina.
