= Malo Očijevo =

Malo Očijevo Мало Очијево
- Village
- Location within Bosnia and Herzegovina
- Coordinates: 44°30′N 16°11′E
- Country: Bosnia and Herzegovina
- Entity: Federation of Bosnia and Herzegovina
- Canton: Una-Sana
- Municipality: Bihać

Area
  - Total: 10.48 sq mi (27.14 km^{2})

Population (2013)
  - Total: 21
  - Density: 2.0/sq mi (0.77/km^{2})
- Time zone: UTC+1 (CET)
  - Summer (DST): UTC+2 (CEST)

Malo Očijevo (Serbian Cyrillic: Мало Очијево) is a village in the municipality of Bihać, Bosnia and Herzegovina.

== Demographics ==
According to the 2013 census, its population was 21, all Serbs.
