= Čivčije Bukovičke =

Čivčije Bukovičke Чивчије Буковичке
- Village
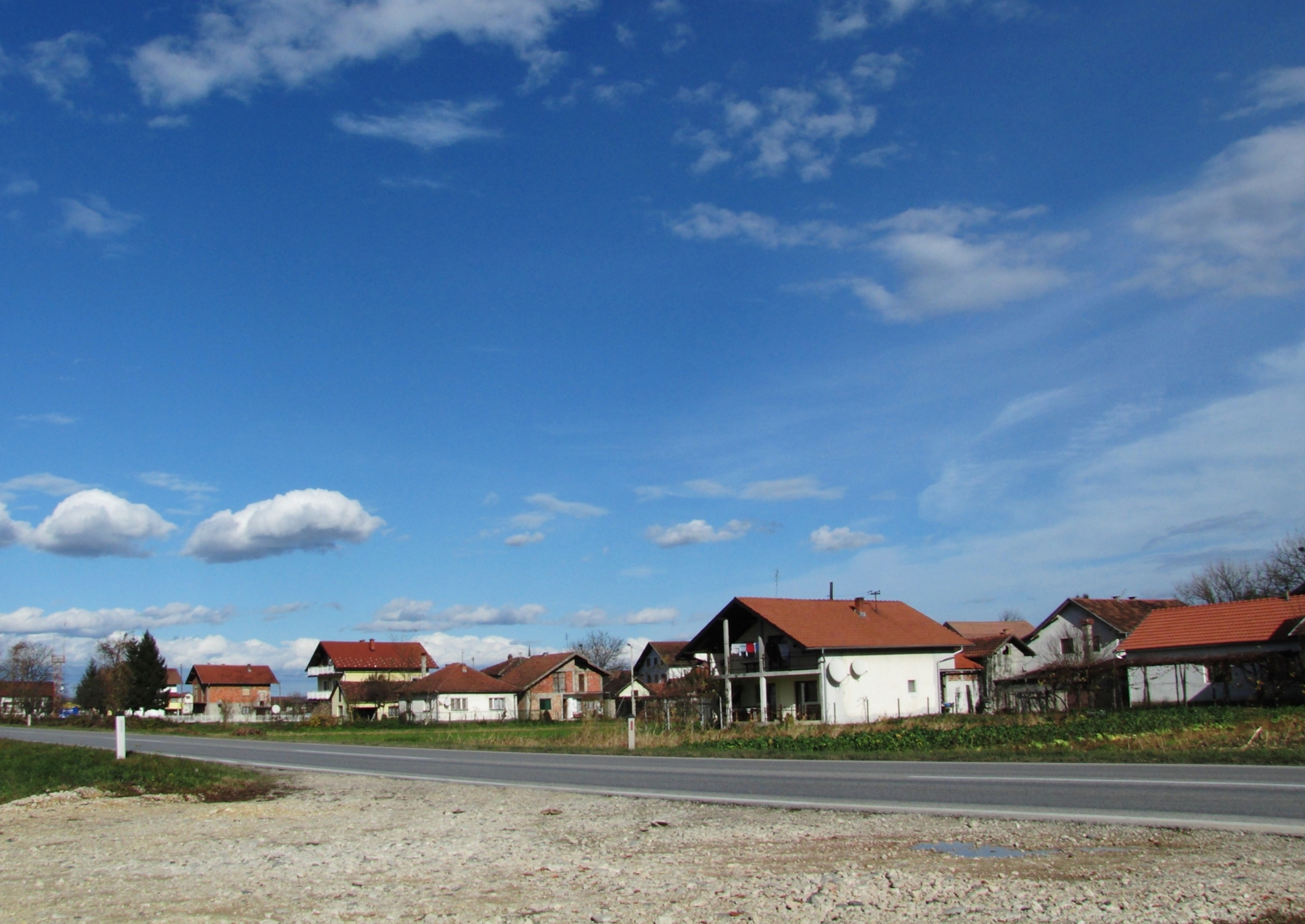

- Location within Bosnia and Herzegovina
- Coordinates: 44°47′N 18°03′E
- Country: Bosnia and Herzegovina
- Entity: Republika Srpska
- Municipality: Doboj
- Time zone: UTC+1 (CET)
  - Summer (DST): UTC+2 (CEST)

Čivčije Bukovičke (Cyrillic: Чивчије Буковичке) is a village in the municipality of Doboj, Bosnia and Herzegovina.
