= Lipnica Srednja =

- Village
- Location within Bosnia and Herzegovina
- Coordinates: 44.5660615°N 18.6242275°E
- Country: Bosnia and Herzegovina
- Entity: Federation of Bosnia and Herzegovina
- Canton: Tuzla
- Municipality: Tuzla

Area
  - Total: 1.39 sq mi (3.59 km^{2})

Population (2013)
  - Total: 195
  - Density: 141/sq mi (54.3/km^{2})
- Time zone: UTC+1 (CET)
  - Summer (DST): UTC+2 (CEST)

Lipnica Srednja is a village in the municipality of Tuzla, Tuzla Canton, Bosnia and Herzegovina.

== Demographics ==
According to the 2013 census, its population was 195.

Ethnicity in 2013
Ethnicity	Number	Percentage
Croats	185	94.9%
Bosniaks	7	3.6%
Serbs	3	1.5%
Total	195	100%
