= Čaklovići Donji =

Village in Bosnia and Herzegovina

- Village
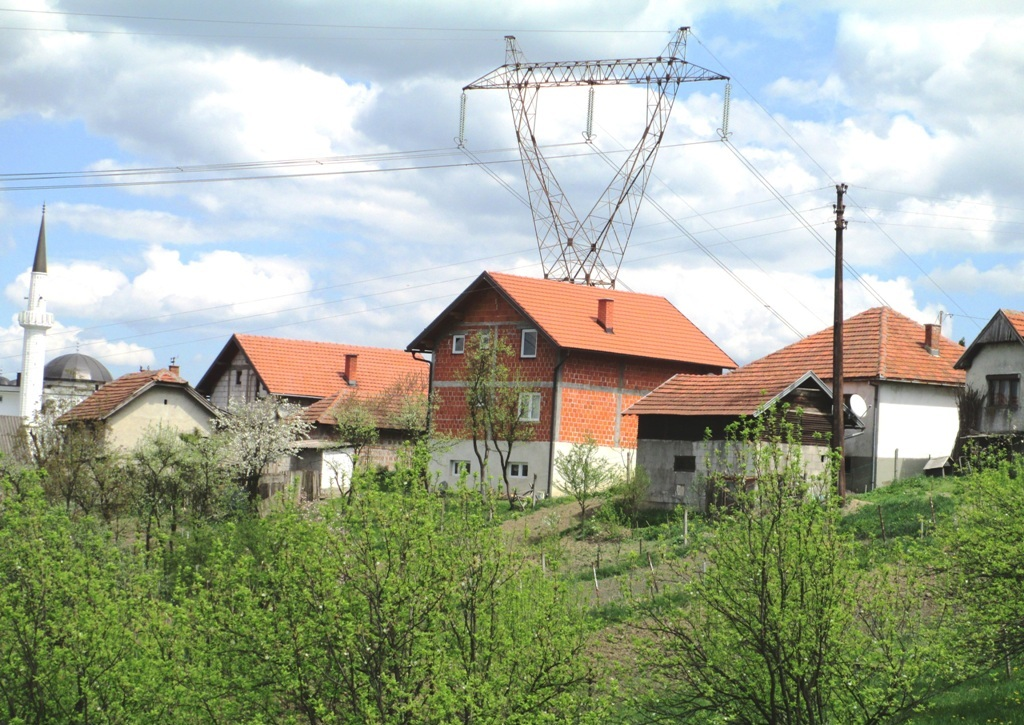

- Location within Bosnia and Herzegovina
- Coordinates: 44.5146857°N 18.7296791°E
- Country: Bosnia and Herzegovina
- Entity: Federation of Bosnia and Herzegovina
- Canton: Tuzla
- Municipality: Tuzla

Area
  - Total: 0.72 sq mi (1.87 km^{2})

Population (2013)
  - Total: 439
  - Density: 608/sq mi (235/km^{2})
- Time zone: UTC+1 (CET)
  - Summer (DST): UTC+2 (CEST)

Čaklovići Donji is a village in the municipality of Tuzla, Tuzla Canton, Bosnia and Herzegovina.

== Demographics ==
According to the 2013 census, its population was 439.

Ethnicity in 2013
| Ethnicity | Number | Percentage |
|---|---|---|
| Bosniaks | 433 | 98.6% |
| Croats | 4 | 0.9% |
| other/undeclared | 2 | 0.5% |
| Total | 439 | 100% |
