= Rječica Gornja =

Rječica Gornja Рјечица Горња
- Village
- Location within Bosnia and Herzegovina
- Coordinates: 44°36′15″N 18°06′01″E
- Country: Bosnia and Herzegovina
- Entity: Republika Srpska
- Municipality: Doboj
- Time zone: UTC+1 (CET)
  - Summer (DST): UTC+2 (CEST)

Rječica Gornja (Serbian: Рјечица Горња) is a village in the municipality of Doboj, Republika Srpska, Bosnia and Herzegovina.
