= Zlopoljac =

Zlopoljac Злопољац
- Village
- Location within Bosnia and Herzegovina
- Coordinates: 44°51′46″N 15°50′26″E
- Country: Bosnia and Herzegovina
- Entity: Federation of Bosnia and Herzegovina
- Canton: Una-Sana
- Municipality: Bihać

Area
  - Total: 0.88 sq mi (2.28 km^{2})

Population (2013)
  - Total: 102
  - Density: 116/sq mi (44.7/km^{2})
- Time zone: UTC+1 (CET)
  - Summer (DST): UTC+2 (CEST)

Zlopoljac (Serbian Cyrillic: Злопољац) is a village in the municipality of Bihać, Bosnia and Herzegovina.

== Demographics ==
According to the 2013 census, its population was 102.

Ethnicity in 2013
Ethnicity	Number	Percentage
Bosniaks	98	96.1%
Croats	1	1.0%
Serbs	1	1.0%
other/undeclared	2	2.0%
Total	102	100%
