= Paočići =

- Village
- Location within Bosnia and Herzegovina
- Coordinates: 43°54′10″N 19°12′48″E
- Country: Bosnia and Herzegovina
- Entity: Republika Srpska
- Municipality: Višegrad
- Time zone: UTC+1 (CET)
  - Summer (DST): UTC+2 (CEST)

Paočići (Serbian: Паочићи) is a village in the municipality of Višegrad, Bosnia and Herzegovina.
