= Mangalin Han =

- Village
- Location within Bosnia and Herzegovina
- Coordinates: 43°47′21″N 19°20′46″E
- Country: Bosnia and Herzegovina
- Entity: Republika Srpska
- Municipality: Višegrad
- Time zone: UTC+1 (CET)
  - Summer (DST): UTC+2 (CEST)

Mangalin Han (Serbian: Мангалин Хан) is a village in the municipality of Višegrad, Bosnia and Herzegovina.
