= Ljeskove Vode =

Ljeskove Vode Љескове Воде
- Village
- Location within Bosnia and Herzegovina
- Coordinates: 44°45′N 17°56′E
- Country: Bosnia and Herzegovina
- Entity: Republika Srpska
- Municipality: Doboj
- Time zone: UTC+1 (CET)
  - Summer (DST): UTC+2 (CEST)

Ljeskove Vode (Cyrillic: Љескове Воде) is a village in the municipality of Doboj, Republika Srpska, Bosnia and Herzegovina.
