= Kraljevice =

- Village
- Location within Bosnia and Herzegovina
- Coordinates: 44.2242251°N 17.603594°E
- Country: Bosnia and Herzegovina
- Entity: Federation of Bosnia and Herzegovina
- Canton: Central Bosnia
- Municipality: Travnik

Area
  - Total: 0.20 sq mi (0.52 km^{2})

Population (2013)
  - Total: 171
  - Density: 850/sq mi (330/km^{2})
- Time zone: UTC+1 (CET)
  - Summer (DST): UTC+2 (CEST)

Kraljevice is a village in the municipality of Travnik, Bosnia and Herzegovina.

== Demographics ==
According to the 2013 census, its population was 171.

Ethnicity in 2013
Ethnicity	Number	Percentage
Croats	170	99.4%
other/undeclared	1	0.6%
Total	171	100%
