= Omerovići, Višegrad =

Omerovići
- Village
- Location within Bosnia and Herzegovina
- Coordinates: 43°51′41″N 19°15′45″E
- Country: Bosnia and Herzegovina
- Entity: Republika Srpska
- Municipality: Višegrad
- Time zone: UTC+1 (CET)
  - Summer (DST): UTC+2 (CEST)

Omerovići (Serbian: Омеровићи) is a village in the municipality of Višegrad, Bosnia and Herzegovina.
