= Gornji Dobrun =

- Village
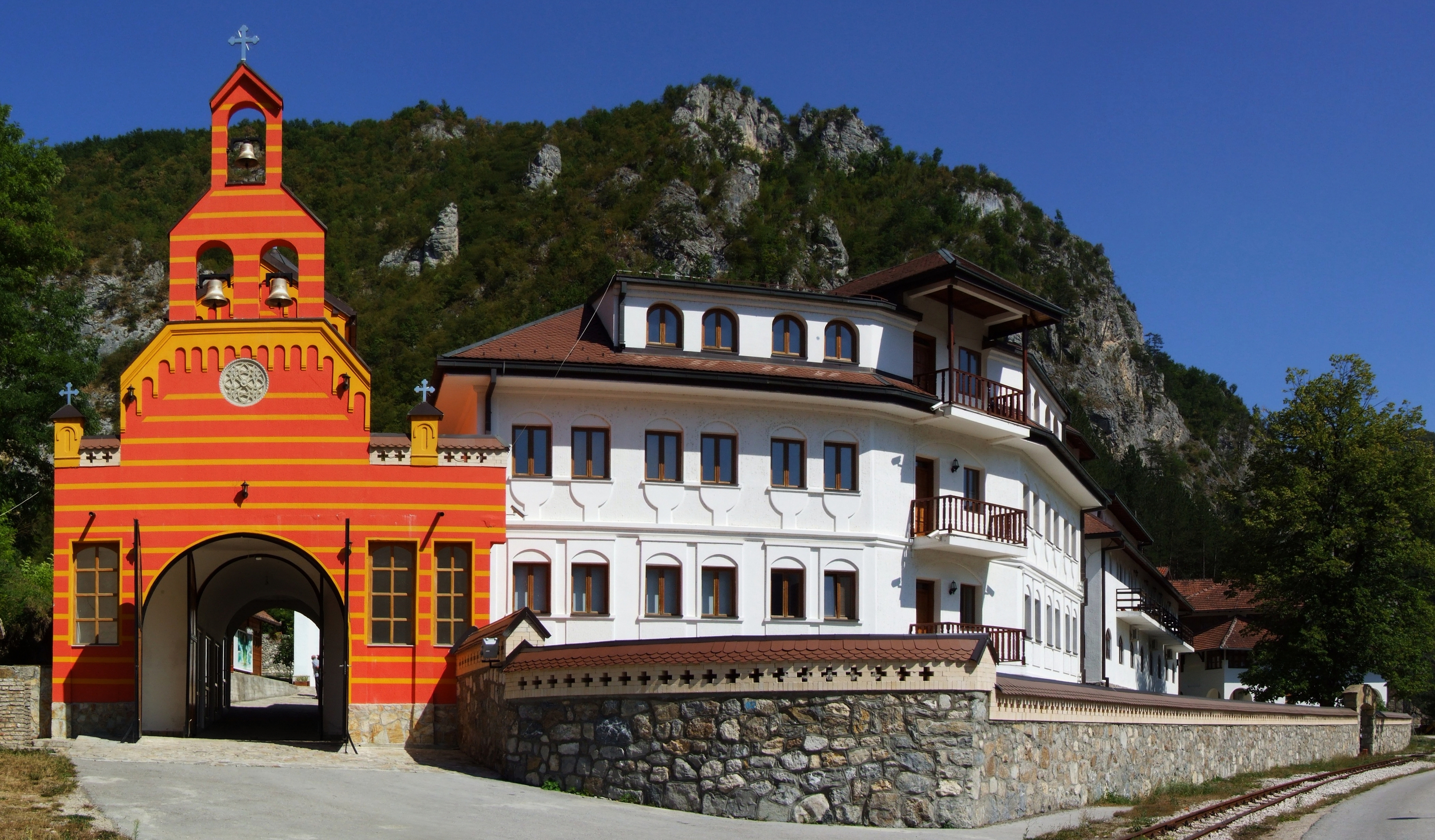
- Dobrun monastery near Gornji Dobrun

- Location within Bosnia and Herzegovina
- Coordinates: 43°44′48″N 19°24′09″E
- Country: Bosnia and Herzegovina
- Entity: Republika Srpska
- Municipality: Višegrad
- Time zone: UTC+1 (CET)
  - Summer (DST): UTC+2 (CEST)

Gornji Dobrun (Serbian: Горњи Добрун) is a village in the municipality of Višegrad, Bosnia and Herzegovina.
