= Mali Cvjetnić =

Mali Cvjetnić Мали Цвјетнић
- Village
- Location within Bosnia and Herzegovina
- Coordinates: 44°25′N 16°11′E
- Country: Bosnia and Herzegovina
- Entity: Federation of Bosnia and Herzegovina
- Canton: Una-Sana
- Municipality: Bihać

Area
  - Total: 11.24 sq mi (29.12 km^{2})

Population (2013)
  - Total: 10
  - Density: 0.89/sq mi (0.34/km^{2})
- Time zone: UTC+1 (CET)
  - Summer (DST): UTC+2 (CEST)

Mali Cvjetnić (Serbian Cyrillic: Мали Цвјетнић) is a village in the municipality of Bihać, Bosnia and Herzegovina.

== Demographics ==
According to the 2013 census, its population was 10, all Serbs.
