= Pozderčići =

Pozderčići Konopljari
- Village
- Nickname: Konopljari
- Location within Bosnia and Herzegovina
- Coordinates: 43°54′N 19°15′E
- Country: Bosnia and Herzegovina
- Entity: Republika Srpska
- Municipality: Višegrad

Population (30)
  - Total: 30
- Time zone: UTC+1 (CET)
  - Summer (DST): UTC+2 (CEST)

Pozderčići (Serbian: Поздерчићи) is a village in the municipality of Višegrad, Bosnia and Herzegovina.
