= Zanožje =

- Village
- Location within Bosnia and Herzegovina
- Coordinates: 43°45′08″N 19°21′28″E
- Country: Bosnia and Herzegovina
- Entity: Republika Srpska
- Municipality: Višegrad
- Time zone: UTC+1 (CET)
  - Summer (DST): UTC+2 (CEST)

Zanožje (Serbian: Заножје) is a village in the municipality of Višegrad, Bosnia and Herzegovina.
