= Kokošari =

- Village
- Location within Bosnia and Herzegovina
- Coordinates: 44.226871°N 17.6143036°E
- Country: Bosnia and Herzegovina
- Entity: Federation of Bosnia and Herzegovina
- Canton: Central Bosnia
- Municipality: Travnik

Area
  - Total: 0.24 sq mi (0.61 km^{2})

Population (2013)
  - Total: 28
  - Density: 120/sq mi (46/km^{2})
- Time zone: UTC+1 (CET)
  - Summer (DST): UTC+2 (CEST)

Kokošari is a village in the municipality of Travnik, Bosnia and Herzegovina.

== Demographics ==
According to the 2013 census, its population was 28.

Ethnicity in 2013
Ethnicity	Number	Percentage
Croats	27	96.4%
Serbs	1	3.6%
Total	28	100%
