= Čaklovići Gornji =

Village in Bosnia and Herzegovina

- Village
- Location within Bosnia and Herzegovina
- Coordinates: 44.5122241°N 18.7509672°E
- Country: Bosnia and Herzegovina
- Entity: Federation of Bosnia and Herzegovina
- Canton: Tuzla
- Municipality: Tuzla

Area
  - Total: 2.49 sq mi (6.44 km^{2})

Population (2013)
  - Total: 1,480
  - Density: 595/sq mi (230/km^{2})
- Time zone: UTC+1 (CET)
  - Summer (DST): UTC+2 (CEST)

Čaklovići Gornji is a village in the municipality of Tuzla, Tuzla Canton, Bosnia and Herzegovina.

== Demographics ==
According to the 2013 census, its population was 1,480.

Ethnicity in 2013
| Ethnicity | Number | Percentage |
|---|---|---|
| Bosniaks | 1,424 | 96.2% |
| Serbs | 36 | 2.4% |
| Croats | 8 | 0.5% |
| other/undeclared | 12 | 0.8% |
| Total | 1,480 | 100% |
