= Obodnica Donja =

- Village
- Location within Bosnia and Herzegovina
- Coordinates: 44.6133495°N 18.6354931°E
- Country: Bosnia and Herzegovina
- Entity: Federation of Bosnia and Herzegovina
- Canton: Tuzla
- Municipality: Tuzla

Area
  - Total: 1.97 sq mi (5.10 km^{2})

Population (2013)
  - Total: 1,017
  - Density: 516/sq mi (199/km^{2})
- Time zone: UTC+1 (CET)
  - Summer (DST): UTC+2 (CEST)

Obodnica Donja is a village in the municipality of Tuzla, Tuzla Canton, Bosnia and Herzegovina.

== Demographics ==
According to the 2013 census, its population was 1,017.

Ethnicity in 2013
Ethnicity	Number	Percentage
Bosniaks	938	92.2%
Serbs	1	0.1%
other/undeclared	78	7.7%
Total	1,017	100%
