= Okolišta =

Coordinates: 43°47′14″N 19°17′16″E

- Village
- Interactive map of Okolišta
- Country: Bosnia and Herzegovina
- Entity: Republika Srpska
- Municipality: Višegrad
- Time zone: UTC+1 (CET)
  - Summer (DST): UTC+2 (CEST)

Okolišta (Serbian: Околишта) is a village in the municipality of Višegrad, Bosnia and Herzegovina.
