= Velika Daljegošta =

- Village
- Location within Bosnia and Herzegovina
- Coordinates: 44°00′43″N 19°31′57″E
- Country: Bosnia and Herzegovina
- Municipality: Srebrenica
- Time zone: UTC+1 (CET)
  - Summer (DST): UTC+2 (CEST)

Velika Daljegošta (Serbian: Велика Даљегошта) was a village in the municipality of Srebrenica, Bosnia and Herzegovina.
