= Hudeč =

- Village
- Location within Bosnia and Herzegovina
- Coordinates: 44.5324927°N 18.6175347°E
- Country: Bosnia and Herzegovina
- Entity: Federation of Bosnia and Herzegovina
- Canton: Tuzla
- Municipality: Tuzla

Area
  - Total: 0.65 sq mi (1.69 km^{2})

Population (2013)
  - Total: 192
  - Density: 294/sq mi (114/km^{2})
- Time zone: UTC+1 (CET)
  - Summer (DST): UTC+2 (CEST)

Hudeč is a village in the municipality of Tuzla, Tuzla Canton, Bosnia and Herzegovina.

== Demographics ==
According to the 2013 census, its population was 192.

Ethnicity in 2013
Ethnicity	Number	Percentage
Bosniaks	76	39.6%
Croats	75	39.1%
Serbs	5	2.6%
other/undeclared	36	18.8%
Total	192	100%
