= Pasci Gornji =

- Village
- Location within Bosnia and Herzegovina
- Coordinates: 44.4913701°N 18.6418248°E
- Country: Bosnia and Herzegovina
- Entity: Federation of Bosnia and Herzegovina
- Canton: Tuzla
- Municipality: Tuzla

Area
  - Total: 1.32 sq mi (3.41 km^{2})

Population (2013)
  - Total: 416
  - Density: 316/sq mi (122/km^{2})
- Time zone: UTC+1 (CET)
  - Summer (DST): UTC+2 (CEST)

Pasci Gornji is a village in the municipality of Tuzla, Tuzla Canton, Bosnia and Herzegovina.

== Demographics ==
According to the 2013 census, its population was 416.

Ethnicity in 2013
Ethnicity	Number	Percentage
Croats	351	84.4%
Bosniaks	28	6.7%
Serbs	24	5.8%
other/undeclared	13	3.1%
Total	416	100%
