= Palučci =

Palučci Палучци
- Village
- Location within Bosnia and Herzegovina
- Coordinates: 44°31′37″N 16°07′11″E
- Country: Bosnia and Herzegovina
- Entity: Federation of Bosnia and Herzegovina
- Canton: Una-Sana
- Municipality: Bihać

Area
  - Total: 2.44 sq mi (6.32 km^{2})

Population (2013)
  - Total: 25
  - Density: 10/sq mi (4.0/km^{2})
- Time zone: UTC+1 (CET)
  - Summer (DST): UTC+2 (CEST)

Palučci (Serbian Cyrillic: Палучци) is a village in the municipality of Bihać, Bosnia and Herzegovina.

== Demographics ==
According to the 2013 census, its population was 25.

Ethnicity in 2013
Ethnicity	Number	Percentage
Serbs	20	80.0%
Bosniaks	2	8.0%
other/undeclared	3	12.0%
Total	25	100%
