= Ljepunice =

- Village
- Location within Bosnia and Herzegovina
- Coordinates: 44.5575715°N 18.5843198°E
- Country: Bosnia and Herzegovina
- Entity: Federation of Bosnia and Herzegovina
- Canton: Tuzla
- Municipality: Tuzla

Area
  - Total: 1.16 sq mi (3.00 km^{2})

Population (2013)
  - Total: 363
  - Density: 313/sq mi (121/km^{2})
- Time zone: UTC+1 (CET)
  - Summer (DST): UTC+2 (CEST)

Ljepunice is a village in the municipality of Tuzla, Tuzla Canton, Bosnia and Herzegovina.

== Demographics ==
According to the 2013 census, its population was 363.

Ethnicity in 2013
Ethnicity	Number	Percentage
Croats	290	79.9%
Bosniaks	32	8.8%
Serbs	6	1.7%
other/undeclared	35	9.6%
Total	363	100%
