= List of settlements in the Federation of Bosnia and Herzegovina/DŽ =

List of settlements in the Federation of Bosnia and Herzegovina - DŽ
Settlement	City or municipality	Canton
Džajići	Konjic	Herzegovina-Neretva Canton
Džanići	Konjic	Herzegovina-Neretva Canton
Džepi	Konjic	Herzegovina-Neretva Canton
Džindići	Goražde	Bosnian Podrinje Canton
Džuha	Goražde	Bosnian Podrinje Canton
