= Seljani =

Seljani may refer to:

- Seljani (Konjic), village in the municipality of Konjic, Bosnia and Herzegovina
- Seljani (Nevesinje), village in the municipality of Nevesinje, Bosnia and Herzegovina
- Seljani, Plužine, village in Montenegro
- Filippoi, formerly called Seljani, in Greece
