= Oteležani =

Oteležani Отележани
- Village
- Location within Bosnia and Herzegovina
- Coordinates: 43°46′N 17°48′E
- Country: Bosnia and Herzegovina
- Entity: Federation of Bosnia and Herzegovina
- Canton: Herzegovina-Neretva
- Municipality: Konjic

Area
  - Total: 1.08 sq mi (2.80 km^{2})

Population (2013)
  - Total: 152
  - Density: 141/sq mi (54.3/km^{2})
- Time zone: UTC+1 (CET)
  - Summer (DST): UTC+2 (CEST)

Oteležani (Cyrillic: Отележани) is a village in the eastern municipality of Konjic, Bosnia and Herzegovina.

== Demographics ==
According to the 2013 census, its population was 152, all Bosniaks.
