= Budišnja Ravan =

Budišnja Ravan Будишња Раван
- Village
- Location within Bosnia and Herzegovina
- Coordinates: 43°45′57″N 17°52′52″E
- Country: Bosnia and Herzegovina
- Entity: Federation of Bosnia and Herzegovina
- Canton: Herzegovina-Neretva
- Municipality: Konjic

Area
  - Total: 0.62 sq mi (1.60 km^{2})

Population (2013)
  - Total: 3
  - Density: 4.9/sq mi (1.9/km^{2})
- Time zone: UTC+1 (CET)
  - Summer (DST): UTC+2 (CEST)

Budišnja Ravan (Cyrillic: Будишња Раван) is a village in the municipality of Konjic, Bosnia and Herzegovina.

== Demographics ==
According to the 2013 census, its population was 3, all Croats.
