= Tuhobići =

Tuhobići Тухобићи
- Village
- Location within Bosnia and Herzegovina
- Coordinates: 43°46′N 17°57′E
- Country: Bosnia and Herzegovina
- Entity: Federation of Bosnia and Herzegovina
- Canton: Herzegovina-Neretva
- Municipality: Konjic

Area
  - Total: 3.88 sq mi (10.05 km^{2})
- Elevation: 3,317 ft (1,011 m)

Population (2013)
  - Total: 59
  - Density: 15/sq mi (5.9/km^{2})
- Time zone: UTC+1 (CET)
  - Summer (DST): UTC+2 (CEST)

Tuhobići (Cyrillic: Тухобићи) is a village in the municipality of Konjic, Bosnia and Herzegovina.

Tuhobići has an estimated terrain elevation above sea level is 1011 metres. Variant forms of spelling for Tuhobići or in other languages: Tuhobić, Tuhobići, Tuhobic, Tuhobici, Tuhobić, Tuhobići.

== Demographics ==
According to the 2013 census, its population was 59, all Bosniaks.
