= Zabrđe, Konjic =

Zabrđe Забрђе
- Village
- Location within Bosnia and Herzegovina
- Country: Bosnia and Herzegovina
- Entity: Federation of Bosnia and Herzegovina
- Canton: Herzegovina-Neretva
- Municipality: Konjic

Area
  - Total: 1.01 sq mi (2.62 km^{2})

Population (2013)
  - Total: 303
  - Density: 300/sq mi (116/km^{2})
- Time zone: UTC+1 (CET)
  - Summer (DST): UTC+2 (CEST)

Zabrđe (Cyrillic: Забрђе) is a village in the municipality of Konjic, Bosnia and Herzegovina.

== Demographics ==
According to the 2013 census, its population was 303.

Ethnicity in 2013
Ethnicity	Number	Percentage
Bosniaks	251	82.8%
Croats	50	16.5%
other/undeclared	2	0.7%
Total	303	100%
