= Zagorice, Konjic =

Zagorice Загорице
- Village
- Location within Bosnia and Herzegovina
- Coordinates: 43°39′35″N 18°04′20″E
- Country: Bosnia and Herzegovina
- Entity: Federation of Bosnia and Herzegovina
- Canton: Herzegovina-Neretva
- Municipality: Konjic

Area
  - Total: 2.31 sq mi (5.98 km^{2})

Population (2013)
  - Total: 187
  - Density: 81.0/sq mi (31.3/km^{2})
- Time zone: UTC+1 (CET)
  - Summer (DST): UTC+2 (CEST)

Zagorice (Cyrillic: Загорице) is a village in the municipality of Konjic, Bosnia and Herzegovina.

== Demographics ==
According to the 2013 census, its population was 187.

Ethnicity in 2013
| Ethnicity | Number | Percentage |
|---|---|---|
| Bosniaks | 180 | 96.3% |
| Serbs | 5 | 2.7% |
| other/undeclared | 2 | 1.1% |
| Total | 187 | 100% |
