= Donja Vratna Gora =

Donja Vratna Gora Доња Вратна Гора
- Village
- Location within Bosnia and Herzegovina
- Coordinates: 43°47′46″N 17°45′14″E
- Country: Bosnia and Herzegovina
- Entity: Federation of Bosnia and Herzegovina
- Canton: Herzegovina-Neretva
- Municipality: Konjic

Area
  - Total: 0.80 sq mi (2.08 km^{2})

Population (2013)
  - Total: 5
  - Density: 6.2/sq mi (2.4/km^{2})
- Time zone: UTC+1 (CET)
  - Summer (DST): UTC+2 (CEST)

Donja Vratna Gora (Cyrillic: Доња Вратна Гора) is a village in the municipality of Konjic, Bosnia and Herzegovina.

== Demographics ==
According to the 2013 census, its population was 5, all Croats.
