= Vrci =

Vrci Врци
- Village
- Location within Bosnia and Herzegovina
- Coordinates: 43°42′N 17°52′E
- Country: Bosnia and Herzegovina
- Entity: Federation of Bosnia and Herzegovina
- Canton: Herzegovina-Neretva
- Municipality: Konjic

Area
  - Total: 1.36 sq mi (3.51 km^{2})

Population (2013)
  - Total: 109
  - Density: 80.4/sq mi (31.1/km^{2})
- Time zone: UTC+1 (CET)
  - Summer (DST): UTC+2 (CEST)

Vrci (Cyrillic: Врци) is a village in the municipality of Konjic, Bosnia and Herzegovina.

== Demographics ==
According to the 2013 census, its population was 109.

Ethnicity in 2013
| Ethnicity | Number | Percentage |
|---|---|---|
| Bosniaks | 105 | 96.3% |
| Croats | 3 | 2.8% |
| other/undeclared | 1 | 0.9% |
| Total | 109 | 100% |
