= Gornji Nevizdraci =

Gornji Nevizdraci Горњи Невиздраци
- Village
- Location within Bosnia and Herzegovina
- Coordinates: 43°43′N 17°52′E
- Country: Bosnia and Herzegovina
- Entity: Federation of Bosnia and Herzegovina
- Canton: Herzegovina-Neretva
- Municipality: Konjic

Area
  - Total: 1.55 sq mi (4.01 km^{2})

Population (2013)
  - Total: 138
  - Density: 89.1/sq mi (34.4/km^{2})
- Time zone: UTC+1 (CET)
  - Summer (DST): UTC+2 (CEST)

Gornji Nevizdraci (Cyrillic: Горњи Невиздраци) is a village in the municipality of Konjic, Bosnia and Herzegovina.

== Demographics ==
According to the 2013 census, its population was 138.

Ethnicity in 2013
Ethnicity	Number	Percentage
Bosniaks	136	98.6%
Croats	1	0.7%
other/undeclared	1	0.7%
Total	138	100%
