= Mladeškovići =

Mladeškovići Младешковићи
- Village
- Location within Bosnia and Herzegovina
- Coordinates: 43°37′N 17°58′E
- Country: Bosnia and Herzegovina
- Entity: Federation of Bosnia and Herzegovina
- Canton: Herzegovina-Neretva
- Municipality: Konjic

Area
  - Total: 2.31 sq mi (5.97 km^{2})

Population (2013)
  - Total: 142
  - Density: 61.6/sq mi (23.8/km^{2})
- Time zone: UTC+1 (CET)
  - Summer (DST): UTC+2 (CEST)

Mladeškovići (Cyrillic: Младешковићи) is a village in the municipality of Konjic, Bosnia and Herzegovina.

== Demographics ==
According to the 2013 census, its population was 142.

Ethnicity in 2013
Ethnicity	Number	Percentage
Bosniaks	88	62.0%
Croats	40	28.2%
Serbs	11	7.7%
other/undeclared	3	2.1%
Total	142	100%
