= Kanjina =

Kanjina Кањина
- Village
- Location within Bosnia and Herzegovina
- Coordinates: 43°41′N 17°59′E
- Country: Bosnia and Herzegovina
- Entity: Federation of Bosnia and Herzegovina
- Canton: Herzegovina-Neretva
- Municipality: Konjic

Area
  - Total: 1.22 sq mi (3.15 km^{2})

Population (2013)
  - Total: 134
  - Density: 110/sq mi (42.5/km^{2})
- Time zone: UTC+1 (CET)
  - Summer (DST): UTC+2 (CEST)

Kanjina (Cyrillic: Кањина) is a village in the municipality of Konjic, Bosnia and Herzegovina.

== Demographics ==
According to the 2013 census, its population was 134.

Ethnicity in 2013
Ethnicity	Number	Percentage
Bosniaks	107	79.9%
Croats	25	18.7%
other/undeclared	2	1.5%
Total	134	100%
