= Blučići =

Blučići Блучићи
- Village
- Location within Bosnia and Herzegovina
- Coordinates: 43°44′N 17°48′E
- Country: Bosnia and Herzegovina
- Entity: Federation of Bosnia and Herzegovina
- Canton: Herzegovina-Neretva
- Municipality: Konjic

Area
  - Total: 0.48 sq mi (1.25 km^{2})

Population (2013)
  - Total: 111
  - Density: 230/sq mi (88.8/km^{2})
- Time zone: UTC+1 (CET)
  - Summer (DST): UTC+2 (CEST)

Blučići (Cyrillic: Блучићи) is a village in the municipality of Konjic, Bosnia and Herzegovina.

== Demographics ==
According to the 2013 census, its population was 111, all Bosniaks.
