= Bulatovići =

- Village
- Location within Bosnia and Herzegovina
- Coordinates: 43°45′N 17°57′E
- Country: Bosnia and Herzegovina
- Entity: Federation of Bosnia and Herzegovina
- Canton: Herzegovina-Neretva
- Municipality: Konjic

Area
  - Total: 0.96 sq mi (2.48 km^{2})

Population (2013)
  - Total: 51
  - Density: 53/sq mi (21/km^{2})
- Time zone: UTC+1 (CET)
  - Summer (DST): UTC+2 (CEST)

Bulatovići (Cyrillic: Булатовићи) is a village in the municipality of Konjic, Bosnia and Herzegovina.

== Demographics ==
According to the 2013 census, its population was 51.

Ethnicity in 2013
Ethnicity	Number	Percentage
Bosniaks	49	96.1%
Croats	2	3.9%
Total	51	100%
