= Čuhovići =

- Village
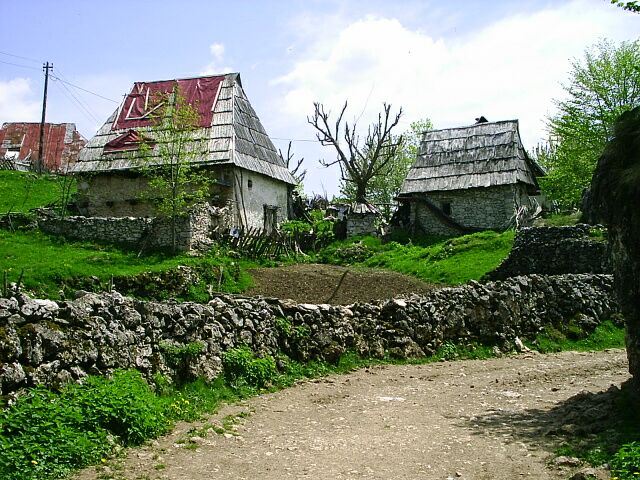

- Location within Bosnia and Herzegovina
- Coordinates: 43°38′N 18°08′E
- Country: Bosnia and Herzegovina
- Entity: Federation of Bosnia and Herzegovina
- Canton: Herzegovina-Neretva
- Municipality: Konjic

Area
  - Total: 16.81 sq mi (43.54 km^{2})

Population (2013)
  - Total: 42
  - Density: 2.5/sq mi (0.96/km^{2})
- Time zone: UTC+1 (CET)
  - Summer (DST): UTC+2 (CEST)

Čuhovići is a village in the municipality of Konjic, Bosnia and Herzegovina.

== Demographics ==
According to the 2013 census, its population was 42, all Bosniaks.
