= Konjic Hydroelectric Power Station =

Rejected proposal for a hydroelectric power plant near Konjic, Bosnia

Konjic Hydro Power Plant
- Country: Bosnia and Herzegovina
- Location: Konjic
- Status: Cancelled

Thermal power station
- Primary fuel: Hydropower

Power generation
- Nameplate capacity: 122 MW

The Konjic Hydro Power Plant was a proposed hydroelectric power plant (HPP) on the Neretva river near Konjic, Bosnia and Herzegovina, and was supposed to be one of the largest HPPs in the country, with predesigned capacity of 122 MW, but project was cancelled due to organized protests by various NGO's from Bosnia and Herzegovina and abroad.
