= Polje Bijela =

Polje Bijela Поље Бијела
- Village
- Location within Bosnia and Herzegovina
- Country: Bosnia and Herzegovina
- Entity: Federation of Bosnia and Herzegovina
- Canton: Herzegovina-Neretva
- Municipality: Konjic

Area
  - Total: 0.86 sq mi (2.24 km^{2})

Population (2013)
  - Total: 1,402
  - Density: 1,620/sq mi (626/km^{2})
- Time zone: UTC+1 (CET)
  - Summer (DST): UTC+2 (CEST)

Polje Bijela (Cyrillic: Поље Бијела) is a village in the municipality of Konjic, Bosnia and Herzegovina.

== Demographics ==
According to the 2013 census, its population was 1,402.

Ethnicity in 2013
Ethnicity	Number	Percentage
Bosniaks	1,285	91.7%
Croats	91	6.5%
Serbs	12	0.9%
other/undeclared	14	1.0%
Total	1,402	100%
