= Gradeljina =

Gradeljina Градељина
- Village
- Location within Bosnia and Herzegovina
- Coordinates: 43°32′N 18°15′E
- Country: Bosnia and Herzegovina
- Entity: Federation of Bosnia and Herzegovina
- Canton: Herzegovina-Neretva
- Municipality: Konjic

Area
  - Total: 4.43 sq mi (11.47 km^{2})

Population (2013)
  - Total: 25
  - Density: 5.6/sq mi (2.2/km^{2})
- Time zone: UTC+1 (CET)
  - Summer (DST): UTC+2 (CEST)

Gradeljina (Cyrillic: Градељина) is a village in the municipality of Konjic, Bosnia and Herzegovina.

== Demographics ==
According to the 2013 census, its population was 25, all Bosniaks.
