= Slavkovići =

Slavkovići Славковићи
- Village
- Location within Bosnia and Herzegovina
- Coordinates: 43°49′N 17°52′E
- Country: Bosnia and Herzegovina
- Entity: Federation of Bosnia and Herzegovina
- Canton: Herzegovina-Neretva
- Municipality: Konjic

Area
  - Total: 5.59 sq mi (14.47 km^{2})

Population (2013)
  - Total: 21
  - Density: 3.8/sq mi (1.5/km^{2})
- Time zone: UTC+1 (CET)
  - Summer (DST): UTC+2 (CEST)

Slavkovići (Cyrillic: Славковићи) is a village in the municipality of Konjic, Bosnia and Herzegovina.

== Demographics ==
According to the 2013 census, its population was 21.

Ethnicity in 2013
Ethnicity	Number	Percentage
Bosniaks	20	95.2%
Croats	1	4.8%
Total	21	100%
