= Radešine =

Radešine Радешине
- Village
- Location within Bosnia and Herzegovina
- Country: Bosnia and Herzegovina
- Entity: Federation of Bosnia and Herzegovina
- Canton: Herzegovina-Neretva
- Municipality: Konjic

Area
  - Total: 1.32 sq mi (3.43 km^{2})

Population (2013)
  - Total: 16
  - Density: 12/sq mi (4.7/km^{2})
- Time zone: UTC+1 (CET)
  - Summer (DST): UTC+2 (CEST)

Radešine (Cyrillic: Радешине) is a village in the municipality of Konjic, Bosnia and Herzegovina.

== Demographics ==
According to the 2013 census, its population was 16.

Ethnicity in 2013
Ethnicity	Number	Percentage
Croats	14	87.5%
Bosniaks	1	6.3%
other/undeclared	1	6.3%
Total	16	100%
