= Galjevo =

- Village
- Location within Bosnia and Herzegovina
- Coordinates: 43°40′N 17°58′E
- Country: Bosnia and Herzegovina
- Entity: Federation of Bosnia and Herzegovina
- Canton: Herzegovina-Neretva
- Municipality: Konjic

Area
  - Total: 0.90 sq mi (2.34 km^{2})

Population (2013)
  - Total: 145
  - Density: 160/sq mi (62.0/km^{2})
- Time zone: UTC+1 (CET)
  - Summer (DST): UTC+2 (CEST)

Galjevo (Cyrillic: Гаљево) is a village in the municipality of Konjic, Bosnia and Herzegovina.

== Demographics ==
According to the 2013 census, its population was 145.

Ethnicity in 2013
| Ethnicity | Number | Percentage |
|---|---|---|
| Bosniaks | 77 | 53.1% |
| Croats | 62 | 42.8% |
| Serbs | 3 | 2.1% |
| other/undeclared | 3 | 2.1% |
| Total | 145 | 100% |
