= Obrenovac, Konjic =

Village in Bosnia and Herzegovina

Obrenovac
- Village
- Location within Bosnia and Herzegovina
- Country: Bosnia and Herzegovina
- Entity: Federation of Bosnia and Herzegovina
- Canton: Herzegovina-Neretva
- Municipality: Konjic

Area
  - Total: 0.40 sq mi (1.04 km^{2})

Population (2013)
  - Total: 12
  - Density: 30/sq mi (12/km^{2})
- Time zone: UTC+1 (CET)
  - Summer (DST): UTC+2 (CEST)

Obrenovac is a village in the municipality of Konjic, Bosnia and Herzegovina.

== Demographics ==
According to the 2013 census, its population was 12, all Croats.
