= Svijenča =

Svijenča Свијенча
- Village
- Location within Bosnia and Herzegovina
- Coordinates: 43°32′N 18°18′E
- Country: Bosnia and Herzegovina
- Entity: Federation of Bosnia and Herzegovina
- Canton: Herzegovina-Neretva
- Municipality: Konjic

Area
  - Total: 3.23 sq mi (8.36 km^{2})

Population (2013)
  - Total: 25
  - Density: 7.7/sq mi (3.0/km^{2})
- Time zone: UTC+1 (CET)
  - Summer (DST): UTC+2 (CEST)

Svijenča (Cyrillic: Свијенча) is a village in the municipality of Konjic, Bosnia and Herzegovina.

== Demographics ==
According to the 2013 census, its population was 25, all Bosniaks.
