= Dobričevići =

Dobričevići Добричевићи
- Village
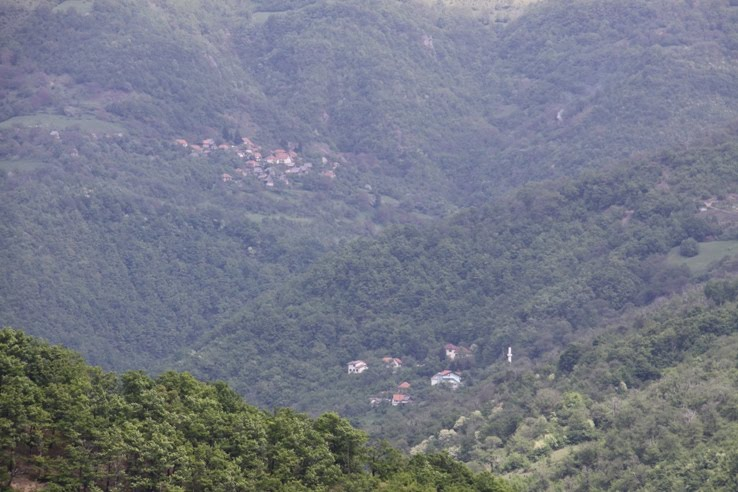

- Location within Bosnia and Herzegovina
- Coordinates: 43°48′N 17°52′E
- Country: Bosnia and Herzegovina
- Entity: Federation of Bosnia and Herzegovina
- Canton: Herzegovina-Neretva
- Municipality: Konjic

Area
  - Total: 1.76 sq mi (4.56 km^{2})

Population (2013)
  - Total: 43
  - Density: 24/sq mi (9.4/km^{2})
- Time zone: UTC+1 (CET)
  - Summer (DST): UTC+2 (CEST)

Dobričevići (Cyrillic: Добричевићи) is a village in the municipality of Konjic, Bosnia and Herzegovina.

== Demographics ==
According to the 2013 census, its population was 43.

Ethnicity in 2013
Ethnicity	Number	Percentage
Bosniaks	39	90.7%
Croats	4	9.3%
Total	43	100%
