= Veluša =

Veluša Велуша
- Village
- Location within Bosnia and Herzegovina
- Coordinates: 43°31′N 18°15′E
- Country: Bosnia and Herzegovina
- Entity: Federation of Bosnia and Herzegovina
- Canton: Herzegovina-Neretva
- Municipality: Konjic

Area
  - Total: 0.84 sq mi (2.18 km^{2})

Population (2013)
  - Total: 6
  - Density: 7.1/sq mi (2.8/km^{2})
- Time zone: UTC+1 (CET)
  - Summer (DST): UTC+2 (CEST)

Veluša (Cyrillic: Велуша) is a village in the municipality of Konjic, Bosnia and Herzegovina.

== Demographics ==
According to the 2013 census, its population was 6, all Bosniaks.
