= Gostovići, Konjic =

Gostovići Гостовићи
- Village
- Location within Bosnia and Herzegovina
- Coordinates: 43°44′N 17°49′E
- Country: Bosnia and Herzegovina
- Entity: Federation of Bosnia and Herzegovina
- Canton: Herzegovina-Neretva
- Municipality: Konjic

Area
  - Total: 0.39 sq mi (1.01 km^{2})

Population (2013)
  - Total: 6
  - Density: 15/sq mi (5.9/km^{2})
- Time zone: UTC+1 (CET)
  - Summer (DST): UTC+2 (CEST)

Gostovići (Cyrillic: Гостовићи) is a village in the municipality of Konjic, Bosnia and Herzegovina.

== Demographics ==
According to the 2013 census, its population was 6.

Ethnicity in 2013
Ethnicity	Number	Percentage
Bosniaks	2	33.3%
Croats	2	33.3%
Serbs	2	33.3%
Total	6	100%
