= Trešnjevica, Konjic =

Trešnjevica Трешњевица
- Village
- Location within Bosnia and Herzegovina
- Coordinates: 43°44′43″N 17°56′05″E
- Country: Bosnia and Herzegovina
- Entity: Federation of Bosnia and Herzegovina
- Canton: Herzegovina-Neretva
- Municipality: Konjic

Area
  - Total: 2.73 sq mi (7.07 km^{2})

Population (2013)
  - Total: 5
  - Density: 1.8/sq mi (0.71/km^{2})
- Time zone: UTC+1 (CET)
  - Summer (DST): UTC+2 (CEST)

Trešnjevica (Cyrillic: Трешњевица) is a village in the municipality of Konjic, Bosnia and Herzegovina.

== Demographics ==
According to the 2013 census, its population was five Croats.
