= Studenčica =

Studenčica Студенчица
- Village
- Location within Bosnia and Herzegovina
- Coordinates: 43°47′N 17°44′E
- Country: Bosnia and Herzegovina
- Entity: Federation of Bosnia and Herzegovina
- Canton: Herzegovina-Neretva
- Municipality: Konjic

Area
  - Total: 1.42 sq mi (3.68 km^{2})

Population (2013)
  - Total: 44
  - Density: 31/sq mi (12/km^{2})
- Time zone: UTC+1 (CET)
  - Summer (DST): UTC+2 (CEST)

Studenčica (Cyrillic: Студенчица) is a village in the municipality of Konjic, Bosnia and Herzegovina. Konjic is a municipality

== Demographics ==
According to the 2013 census, its population was 44, all Bosniaks.
