= Goransko Polje =

Goransko Polje Горанско Поље
- Village
- Location within Bosnia and Herzegovina
- Coordinates: 43°44′N 17°49′E
- Country: Bosnia and Herzegovina
- Entity: Federation of Bosnia and Herzegovina
- Canton: Herzegovina-Neretva
- Municipality: Konjic

Area
  - Total: 0.42 sq mi (1.09 km^{2})

Population (2013)
  - Total: 56
  - Density: 130/sq mi (51/km^{2})
- Time zone: UTC+1 (CET)
  - Summer (DST): UTC+2 (CEST)

Goransko Polje (Cyrillic: Горанско Поље) is a village in the municipality of Konjic, Bosnia and Herzegovina.

== Demographics ==
According to the 2013 census, Goransko Polje's population was 56.

Ethnicity in 2013
Ethnicity	Number	Percentage
Bosniaks	47	83.9%
Croats	9	16.1%
Total	56	100%
