= Stojkovići, Konjic =

Stojkovići Стојковићи
- Village
- Location within Bosnia and Herzegovina
- Coordinates: 43°46′14″N 17°56′26″E
- Country: Bosnia and Herzegovina
- Entity: Federation of Bosnia and Herzegovina
- Canton: Herzegovina-Neretva
- Municipality: Konjic

Area
  - Total: 6.96 sq mi (18.03 km^{2})

Population (2013)
  - Total: 28
  - Density: 4.0/sq mi (1.6/km^{2})
- Time zone: UTC+1 (CET)
  - Summer (DST): UTC+2 (CEST)

Stojkovići (Cyrillic: Стојковићи) is a village in the municipality of Konjic, Bosnia and Herzegovina.

== Demographics ==
According to the 2013 census, its population was 28, all Bosniaks.
