= Homolje, Konjic =

Village in Bosnia and Herzegovina

Homolje
- Village
- Location within Bosnia and Herzegovina
- Country: Bosnia and Herzegovina
- Entity: Federation of Bosnia and Herzegovina
- Canton: Herzegovina-Neretva
- Municipality: Konjic

Area
  - Total: 1.03 sq mi (2.68 km^{2})

Population (2013)
  - Total: 144
  - Density: 139/sq mi (53.7/km^{2})
- Time zone: UTC+1 (CET)
  - Summer (DST): UTC+2 (CEST)

Homolje is a village in the municipality of Konjic, Bosnia and Herzegovina.

== Demographics ==
According to the 2013 census, its population was 144, all Bosniaks.
