= Kralupi =

Kralupi Кралупи
- Village
- Location within Bosnia and Herzegovina
- Coordinates: 43°41′58″N 17°54′47″E
- Country: Bosnia and Herzegovina
- Entity: Federation of Bosnia and Herzegovina
- Canton: Herzegovina-Neretva
- Municipality: Konjic

Area
  - Total: 1.28 sq mi (3.32 km^{2})

Population (2013)
  - Total: 288
  - Density: 225/sq mi (86.7/km^{2})
- Time zone: UTC+1 (CET)
  - Summer (DST): UTC+2 (CEST)

Kralupi (Cyrillic: Кралупи) is a village in the municipality of Konjic, Bosnia and Herzegovina.

== Demographics ==
According to the 2013 census, its population was 288.

Ethnicity in 2013
Ethnicity	Number	Percentage
Bosniaks	193	67.0%
Serbs	1	0.3%
other/undeclared	94	32.6%
Total	288	100%
