= Zukići, Konjic =

Zukići Зукићи
- Village
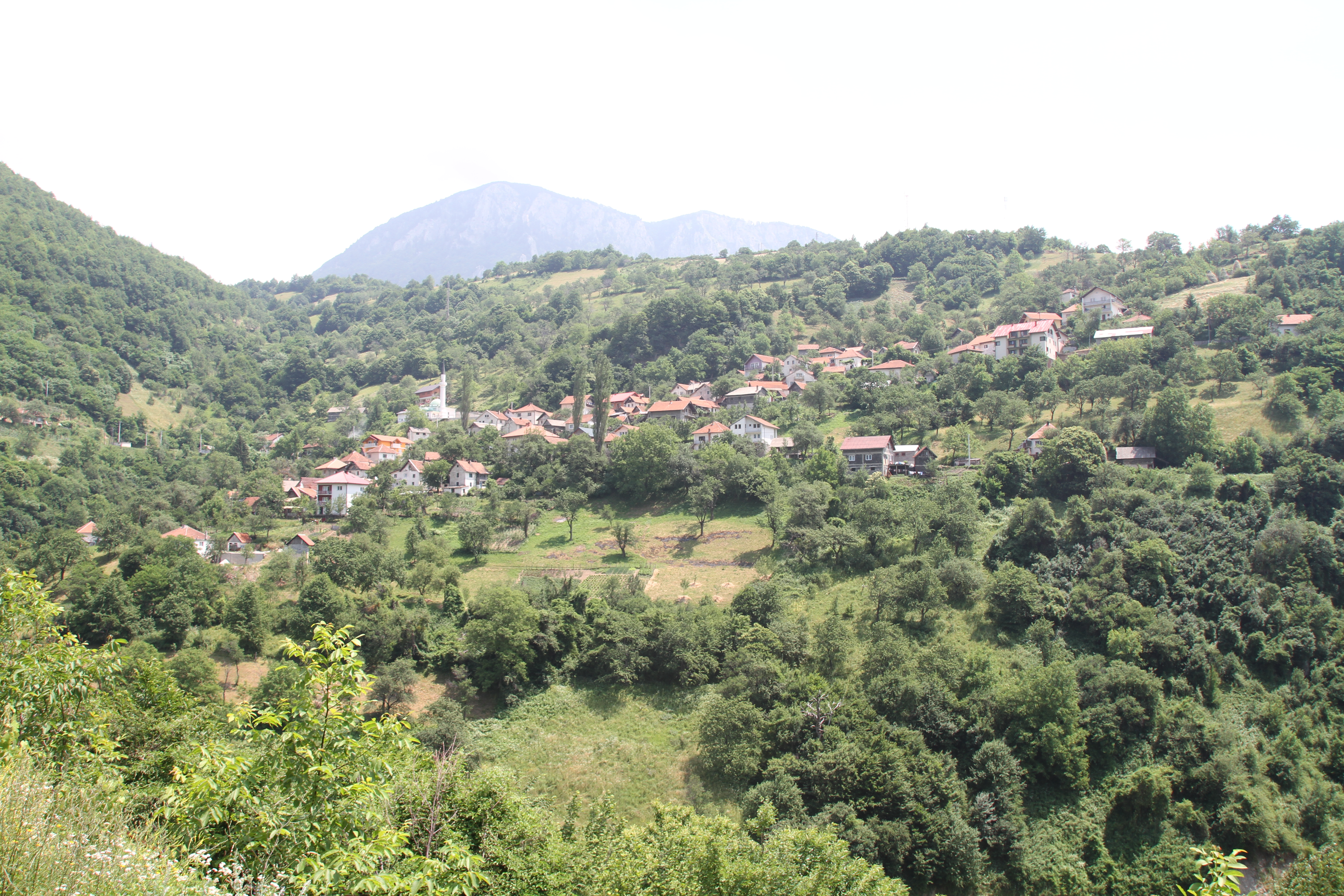

- Location within Bosnia and Herzegovina
- Coordinates: 43°43′50″N 17°59′56″E
- Country: Bosnia and Herzegovina
- Entity: Federation of Bosnia and Herzegovina
- Canton: Herzegovina-Neretva
- Municipality: Konjic

Area
  - Total: 2.43 sq mi (6.30 km^{2})

Population (2013)
  - Total: 245
  - Density: 101/sq mi (38.9/km^{2})
- Time zone: UTC+1 (CET)
  - Summer (DST): UTC+2 (CEST)

Zukići (Cyrillic: Зукићи) is a village in the municipality of Konjic, Bosnia and Herzegovina.

== Demographics ==
According to the 2013 census, its population was 245.

Ethnicity in 2013
Ethnicity	Number	Percentage
Bosniaks	241	98.4%
Croats	4	1.6%
Total	245	100%
