= Barmiš =

Barmiš Бармиш
- Village
- Location within Bosnia and Herzegovina
- Coordinates: 43°43′N 17°56′E
- Country: Bosnia and Herzegovina
- Entity: Federation of Bosnia and Herzegovina
- Canton: Herzegovina-Neretva
- Municipality: Konjic

Area
  - Total: 1.08 sq mi (2.80 km^{2})
- Elevation: 3,350 ft (1,020 m)

Population (2013)
  - Total: 17
  - Density: 16/sq mi (6.1/km^{2})
- Time zone: UTC+1 (CET)
  - Summer (DST): UTC+2 (CEST)
- Postal code: 88404
- Area code: 036

Barmiš (Cyrillic: Бармиш) is a village in the municipality of Konjic, Bosnia and Herzegovina.

== Demographics ==
According to the 2013 census, its population was 17.

Ethnicity in 2013
Ethnicity	Number	Percentage
Bosniaks	12	70.6%
other/undeclared	5	29.4%
Total	17	100%
