= Repovica =

Repovica Реповица
- Village
- Location within Bosnia and Herzegovina
- Coordinates: 43°39′N 17°58′E
- Country: Bosnia and Herzegovina
- Entity: Federation of Bosnia and Herzegovina
- Canton: Herzegovina-Neretva
- Municipality: Konjic

Area
  - Total: 0.86 sq mi (2.23 km^{2})

Population (2013)
  - Total: 96
  - Density: 110/sq mi (43/km^{2})
- Time zone: UTC+1 (CET)
  - Summer (DST): UTC+2 (CEST)

Repovica (Cyrillic: Реповица) is a village in the municipality of Konjic, Bosnia and Herzegovina.

== Demographics ==
According to the 2013 census, its population was 96.

Ethnicity in 2013
Ethnicity	Number	Percentage
Bosniaks	73	76.0%
Croats	22	22.9%
Serbs	1	1.0%
Total	96	100%
