= Turija, Konjic =

Turija Турија
- Village
- Location within Bosnia and Herzegovina
- Coordinates: 43°38′06″N 17°56′38″E
- Country: Bosnia and Herzegovina
- Entity: Federation of Bosnia and Herzegovina
- Canton: Herzegovina-Neretva
- Municipality: Konjic

Area
  - Total: 2.82 sq mi (7.31 km^{2})

Population (2013)
  - Total: 34
  - Density: 12/sq mi (4.7/km^{2})
- Time zone: UTC+1 (CET)
  - Summer (DST): UTC+2 (CEST)

Turija (Cyrillic: Турија) is a village in the municipality of Konjic, Bosnia and Herzegovina.

== Demographics ==
According to the 2013 census, its population was 34.

Ethnicity in 2013
| Ethnicity | Number | Percentage |
|---|---|---|
| Croats | 33 | 97.1% |
| Bosniaks | 1 | 2.9% |
| Total | 34 | 100% |
