= Pokojište =

Pokojište Покојиште
- Village
- Location within Bosnia and Herzegovina
- Coordinates: 43°41′N 17°55′E
- Country: Bosnia and Herzegovina
- Entity: Federation of Bosnia and Herzegovina
- Canton: Herzegovina-Neretva
- Municipality: Konjic

Area
  - Total: 0.61 sq mi (1.58 km^{2})

Population (2013)
  - Total: 68
  - Density: 110/sq mi (43/km^{2})
- Time zone: UTC+1 (CET)
  - Summer (DST): UTC+2 (CEST)

Pokojište (Cyrillic: Покојиште) is a village in the municipality of Konjic, Bosnia and Herzegovina.

== Demographics ==
According to the 2013 census, its population was 68.

Ethnicity in 2013
Ethnicity	Number	Percentage
Bosniaks	53	77.9%
Croats	13	19.1%
Serbs	2	2.9%
Total	68	100%
