= Došćica =

Došćica Дошћица
- Village
- Location within Bosnia and Herzegovina
- Coordinates: 43°46′N 17°43′E
- Country: Bosnia and Herzegovina
- Entity: Federation of Bosnia and Herzegovina
- Canton: Herzegovina-Neretva
- Municipality: Konjic

Area
  - Total: 0.76 sq mi (1.97 km^{2})

Population (2013)
  - Total: 2
  - Density: 2.6/sq mi (1.0/km^{2})
- Time zone: UTC+1 (CET)
  - Summer (DST): UTC+2 (CEST)

Došćica (Cyrillic: Дошћица) is a village in the municipality of Konjic, Bosnia and Herzegovina.

== Demographics ==
According to the 2013 census, its population was just 2, both Croats.
