= Redžići =

Redžići Реџићи
- Village
- Location within Bosnia and Herzegovina
- Country: Bosnia and Herzegovina
- Entity: Federation of Bosnia and Herzegovina
- Canton: Herzegovina-Neretva
- Municipality: Konjic

Area
  - Total: 1.04 sq mi (2.69 km^{2})

Population (2013)
  - Total: 31
  - Density: 30/sq mi (12/km^{2})
- Time zone: UTC+1 (CET)
  - Summer (DST): UTC+2 (CEST)

Redžići (Cyrillic: Реџићи) is a village in the municipality of Konjic, Bosnia and Herzegovina.

== Demographics ==
According to the 2013 census, its population was 31, all Bosniaks.
