= Hondići =

Hondići Хондићи
- Village
- Location within Bosnia and Herzegovina
- Coordinates: 43°42′N 17°54′E
- Country: Bosnia and Herzegovina
- Entity: Federation of Bosnia and Herzegovina
- Canton: Herzegovina-Neretva
- Municipality: Konjic

Area
  - Total: 0.87 sq mi (2.25 km^{2})

Population (2013)
  - Total: 11
  - Density: 13/sq mi (4.9/km^{2})
- Time zone: UTC+1 (CET)
  - Summer (DST): UTC+2 (CEST)

Hondići (Cyrillic: Хондићи) is a village in the municipality of Konjic, Bosnia and Herzegovina.

== Demographics ==
According to the 2013 census, its population was 11.

Ethnicity in 2013
Ethnicity	Number	Percentage
Bosniaks	7	63.6%
other/undeclared	4	36.4%
Total	11	100%
