= Krajkovići, Konjic =

Krajkovići Крајковићи
- Village
- Location within Bosnia and Herzegovina
- Coordinates: 43°47′19″N 17°49′07″E
- Country: Bosnia and Herzegovina
- Entity: Federation of Bosnia and Herzegovina
- Canton: Herzegovina-Neretva
- Municipality: Konjic

Area
  - Total: 0.097 sq mi (0.25 km^{2})

Population (2013)
  - Total: 6
  - Density: 62/sq mi (24/km^{2})
- Time zone: UTC+1 (CET)
  - Summer (DST): UTC+2 (CEST)

Krajkovići (Cyrillic: Крајковићи) is a village in the municipality of Konjic, Bosnia and Herzegovina.

== Demographics ==
According to the 2013 census, its population was 6, all Bosniaks.
