= Gornje Višnjevice =

Gornje Višnjevice Горње Вишњевице
- Village
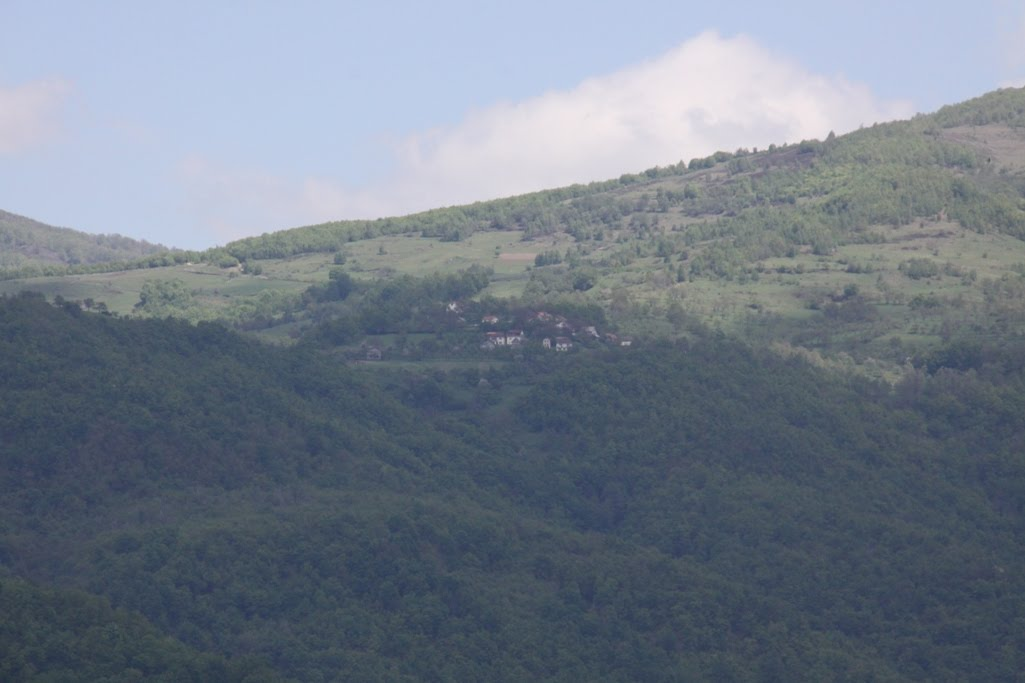

- Location within Bosnia and Herzegovina
- Coordinates: 43°45′N 17°52′E
- Country: Bosnia and Herzegovina
- Entity: Federation of Bosnia and Herzegovina
- Canton: Herzegovina-Neretva
- Municipality: Konjic

Area
  - Total: 1.37 sq mi (3.54 km^{2})

Population (2013)
  - Total: 87
  - Density: 64/sq mi (25/km^{2})
- Time zone: UTC+1 (CET)
  - Summer (DST): UTC+2 (CEST)

Gornje Višnjevice (Cyrillic: Горње Вишњевице) is a village in the municipality of Konjic, Bosnia and Herzegovina.

== Demographics ==
According to the 2013 census, its population was 87.

Ethnicity in 2013
Ethnicity	Number	Percentage
Bosniaks	68	78.2%
Croats	18	20.7%
other/undeclared	1	1.1%
Total	87	100%
