= Treboje =

- Village
- Location within Bosnia and Herzegovina
- Coordinates: 43°43′N 17°53′E
- Country: Bosnia and Herzegovina
- Entity: Federation of Bosnia and Herzegovina
- Canton: Herzegovina-Neretva
- Municipality: Konjic

Area
  - Total: 0.78 sq mi (2.01 km^{2})

Population (2013)
  - Total: 141
  - Density: 182/sq mi (70.1/km^{2})
- Time zone: UTC+1 (CET)
  - Summer (DST): UTC+2 (CEST)

Treboje is a village in the municipality of Konjic, Bosnia and Herzegovina.

== Demographics ==
According to the 2013 census, its population was 141.

Ethnicity in 2013
Ethnicity	Number	Percentage
Bosniaks	139	98.6%
other/undeclared	2	1.4%
Total	141	100%
