= Ugošće =

Ugošće Угошће
- Village
- Location within Bosnia and Herzegovina
- Coordinates: 43°42′N 17°56′E
- Country: Bosnia and Herzegovina
- Entity: Federation of Bosnia and Herzegovina
- Canton: Herzegovina-Neretva
- Municipality: Konjic

Area
  - Total: 2.28 sq mi (5.91 km^{2})

Population (2013)
  - Total: 7
  - Density: 3.1/sq mi (1.2/km^{2})
- Time zone: UTC+1 (CET)
  - Summer (DST): UTC+2 (CEST)

Ugošće (Cyrillic: Угошће) is a village in the municipality of Konjic, Bosnia and Herzegovina.

== Demographics ==
According to the 2013 census, its population was 7, all Bosniaks.
