= Strgonice =

Strgonice Стргонице
- Village
- Location within Bosnia and Herzegovina
- Coordinates: 43°44′N 17°54′E
- Country: Bosnia and Herzegovina
- Entity: Federation of Bosnia and Herzegovina
- Canton: Herzegovina-Neretva
- Municipality: Konjic

Area
  - Total: 0.80 sq mi (2.06 km^{2})

Population (2013)
  - Total: 4
  - Density: 5.0/sq mi (1.9/km^{2})
- Time zone: UTC+1 (CET)
  - Summer (DST): UTC+2 (CEST)

Strgonice (Cyrillic: Стргонице) is a village in the municipality of Konjic, Bosnia and Herzegovina.

== Demographics ==
According to the 2013 census, its population was 4, all Croats.
