= Donje Višnjevice =

Donje Višnjevice Доње Вишњевице
- Village
- Location within Bosnia and Herzegovina
- Coordinates: 43°45′N 17°52′E
- Country: Bosnia and Herzegovina
- Entity: Federation of Bosnia and Herzegovina
- Canton: Herzegovina-Neretva
- Municipality: Konjic

Area
  - Total: 1.08 sq mi (2.79 km^{2})

Population (2013)
  - Total: 71
  - Density: 66/sq mi (25/km^{2})
- Time zone: UTC+1 (CET)
  - Summer (DST): UTC+2 (CEST)

Donje Višnjevice (Cyrillic: Доње Вишњевице) is a village in the municipality of Konjic, Bosnia and Herzegovina.

== Demographics ==
According to the 2013 census, its population was 71.

Ethnicity in 2013
Ethnicity	Number	Percentage
Bosniaks	66	93.0%
Croats	4	5.6%
other/undeclared	1	1.4%
Total	71	100%
