= Mokro, Konjic =

Mokro Мокро
- Village
- Location within Bosnia and Herzegovina
- Coordinates: 43°30′26″N 18°16′52″E
- Country: Bosnia and Herzegovina
- Entity: Federation of Bosnia and Herzegovina
- Canton: Herzegovina-Neretva
- Municipality: Konjic

Area
  - Total: 0.98 sq mi (2.55 km^{2})

Population (2013)
  - Total: 7
  - Density: 7.1/sq mi (2.7/km^{2})
- Time zone: UTC+1 (CET)
  - Summer (DST): UTC+2 (CEST)

Mokro (Cyrillic: Мокро) is a village in the municipality of Konjic, Bosnia and Herzegovina.

== Demographics ==
According to the 2013 census, its population was 7.

Ethnicity in 2013
Ethnicity	Number	Percentage
Bosniaks	4	57.1%
Croats	3	42.9%
Total	7	100%
