= Homatlije =

Homatlije Хоматлије
- Village
- Location within Bosnia and Herzegovina
- Coordinates: 43°47′N 17°44′E
- Country: Bosnia and Herzegovina
- Entity: Federation of Bosnia and Herzegovina
- Canton: Herzegovina-Neretva
- Municipality: Konjic

Area
  - Total: 0.72 sq mi (1.86 km^{2})

Population (2013)
  - Total: 4
  - Density: 5.6/sq mi (2.2/km^{2})
- Time zone: UTC+1 (CET)
  - Summer (DST): UTC+2 (CEST)

Homatlije (Cyrillic: Хоматлије) is a village in the municipality of Konjic, Bosnia and Herzegovina.

== Demographics ==
According to the 2013 census, its population was 4.

Ethnicity in 2013
Ethnicity	Number	Percentage
Bosniaks	3	75.0%
Croats	1	25.0%
Total	4	100%
