= Gornja Vratna Gora =

Gornja Vratna Gora Горња Вратна Гора
- Village
- Location within Bosnia and Herzegovina
- Coordinates: 43°48′28″N 17°45′32″E
- Country: Bosnia and Herzegovina
- Entity: Federation of Bosnia and Herzegovina
- Canton: Herzegovina-Neretva
- Municipality: Konjic

Area
  - Total: 0.98 sq mi (2.55 km^{2})

Population (2013)
  - Total: 0
  - Density: 0.0/sq mi (0.0/km^{2})
- Time zone: UTC+1 (CET)
  - Summer (DST): UTC+2 (CEST)

Gornja Vratna Gora (Cyrillic: Горња Вратна Гора) is a village in the municipality of Konjic, Bosnia and Herzegovina.

== Demographics ==
According to the 2013 census, its population was nil, down from 48 in 1991.
