= Raotići =

Raotići Раотићи
- Village
- Location within Bosnia and Herzegovina
- Coordinates: 43°46′N 17°52′E
- Country: Bosnia and Herzegovina
- Entity: Federation of Bosnia and Herzegovina
- Canton: Herzegovina-Neretva
- Municipality: Konjic

Area
  - Total: 1.61 sq mi (4.17 km^{2})

Population (2013)
  - Total: 52
  - Density: 32/sq mi (12/km^{2})
- Time zone: UTC+1 (CET)
  - Summer (DST): UTC+2 (CEST)

Raotići (Cyrillic: Раотићи) is a village in the municipality of Konjic, Bosnia and Herzegovina.

== Demographics ==
According to the 2013 census, its population was 52, all Bosniaks.
