= Gakići =

Gakići Гакићи
- Village
- Location within Bosnia and Herzegovina
- Coordinates: 43°36′07″N 18°00′32″E
- Country: Bosnia and Herzegovina
- Entity: Federation of Bosnia and Herzegovina
- Canton: Herzegovina-Neretva
- Municipality: Konjic

Area
  - Total: 0.57 sq mi (1.47 km^{2})

Population (2013)
  - Total: 10
  - Density: 18/sq mi (6.8/km^{2})
- Time zone: UTC+1 (CET)
  - Summer (DST): UTC+2 (CEST)

Gakići (Serbian Cyrillic: Гакићи) is a village in the municipality of Konjic, Bosnia and Herzegovina. It is notable for reconstructing a local road, destroyed during the Bosnian war.

== Demographics ==
According to the 2013 census, its population was 10, all Bosniaks.
