= Vrdolje =

Vrdolje Врдоље
- Village
- Location within Bosnia and Herzegovina
- Coordinates: 43°39′N 18°03′E
- Country: Bosnia and Herzegovina
- Entity: Federation of Bosnia and Herzegovina
- Canton: Herzegovina-Neretva
- Municipality: Konjic

Area
  - Total: 4.89 sq mi (12.66 km^{2})

Population (2013)
  - Total: 72
  - Density: 15/sq mi (5.7/km^{2})
- Time zone: UTC+1 (CET)
  - Summer (DST): UTC+2 (CEST)

Vrdolje (Cyrillic: Врдоље) is a village in the municipality of Konjic, Bosnia and Herzegovina.

== Demographics ==
According to the 2013 census, its population was 72.

Ethnicity in 2013
| Ethnicity | Number | Percentage |
|---|---|---|
| Bosniaks | 71 | 98.6% |
| other/undeclared | 1 | 1.4% |
| Total | 72 | 100% |
