= Bušćak =

Bušćak Бушћак
- Village
- Location within Bosnia and Herzegovina
- Coordinates: 43°47′N 17°48′E
- Country: Bosnia and Herzegovina
- Entity: Federation of Bosnia and Herzegovina
- Canton: Herzegovina-Neretva
- Municipality: Konjic

Area
  - Total: 1.55 sq mi (4.02 km^{2})

Population (2013)
  - Total: 15
  - Density: 9.7/sq mi (3.7/km^{2})
- Time zone: UTC+1 (CET)
  - Summer (DST): UTC+2 (CEST)

Bušćak (Cyrillic: Бушћак) is a village in the municipality of Konjic, Bosnia and Herzegovina.

== Demographics ==
According to the 2013 census, its population was 15, all Bosniaks.
