= Spiljani =

Spiljani Спиљани
- Village
- Location within Bosnia and Herzegovina
- Coordinates: 43°37′N 18°01′E
- Country: Bosnia and Herzegovina
- Entity: Federation of Bosnia and Herzegovina
- Canton: Herzegovina-Neretva
- Municipality: Konjic

Area
  - Total: 5.36 sq mi (13.87 km^{2})

Population (2013)
  - Total: 398
  - Density: 74.3/sq mi (28.7/km^{2})
- Time zone: UTC+1 (CET)
  - Summer (DST): UTC+2 (CEST)

Spiljani (Cyrillic: Спиљани) is a village in the municipality of Konjic, Bosnia and Herzegovina.

== Demographics ==
According to the 2013 census, its population was 398.

Ethnicity in 2013
Ethnicity	Number	Percentage
Bosniaks	385	96.7%
Croats	9	2.3%
other/undeclared	4	1.0%
Total	398	100%
