= Luka, Konjic =

Bosnian village

Luka Лука
- Village
- Location within Bosnia and Herzegovina
- Coordinates: 43°32′35″N 18°13′45″E
- Country: Bosnia and Herzegovina
- Entity: Federation of Bosnia and Herzegovina
- Canton: Herzegovina-Neretva
- Municipality: Konjic

Area
  - Total: 21.06 sq mi (54.55 km^{2})

Population (2013)
  - Total: 78
  - Density: 3.7/sq mi (1.4/km^{2})
- Time zone: UTC+1 (CET)
  - Summer (DST): UTC+2 (CEST)

Luka (Cyrillic: Лука) is a village in the municipality of Konjic, Bosnia and Herzegovina.

== Demographics ==
According to the 2013 census, its population was 78, all Bosniaks.
