= Požetva =

Požetva Пожетва
- Village
- Location within Bosnia and Herzegovina
- Coordinates: 43°51′N 17°52′E
- Country: Bosnia and Herzegovina
- Entity: Federation of Bosnia and Herzegovina
- Canton: Herzegovina-Neretva
- Municipality: Konjic

Area
  - Total: 8.35 sq mi (21.62 km^{2})

Population (2013)
  - Total: 8
  - Density: 0.96/sq mi (0.37/km^{2})
- Time zone: UTC+1 (CET)
  - Summer (DST): UTC+2 (CEST)

Požetva (Cyrillic: Пожетва) is a village in the municipality of Konjic, Bosnia and Herzegovina.

== Demographics ==
According to the 2013 census, its population was 8, all Croats.
