= Prevlje =

Prevlje Превље
- Village
- Location within Bosnia and Herzegovina
- Coordinates: 43°38′N 17°58′E
- Country: Bosnia and Herzegovina
- Entity: Federation of Bosnia and Herzegovina
- Canton: Herzegovina-Neretva
- Municipality: Konjic

Area
  - Total: 0.24 sq mi (0.61 km^{2})

Population (2013)
  - Total: 49
  - Density: 210/sq mi (80/km^{2})
- Time zone: UTC+1 (CET)
  - Summer (DST): UTC+2 (CEST)

Prevlje (Cyrillic: Превље) is a village in the municipality of Konjic, Bosnia and Herzegovina.

== Demographics ==
According to the 2013 census, its population was 49, all Bosniaks.
