= Donji Nevizdraci =

Donji Nevizdraci Доњи Невиздраци
- Village
- Location within Bosnia and Herzegovina
- Coordinates: 43°43′N 17°52′E
- Country: Bosnia and Herzegovina
- Entity: Federation of Bosnia and Herzegovina
- Canton: Herzegovina-Neretva
- Municipality: Konjic

Area
  - Total: 0.44 sq mi (1.14 km^{2})

Population (2013)
  - Total: 0
  - Density: 0.0/sq mi (0.0/km^{2})
- Time zone: UTC+1 (CET)
  - Summer (DST): UTC+2 (CEST)

Donji Nevizdraci (Cyrillic: Доњи Невиздраци) is a village in the municipality of Konjic, Bosnia and Herzegovina.

== Demographics ==
According to the 2013 census, its population was nil, down from 22 in 1991.
