= Džepi =

Džepi Џепи
- Village
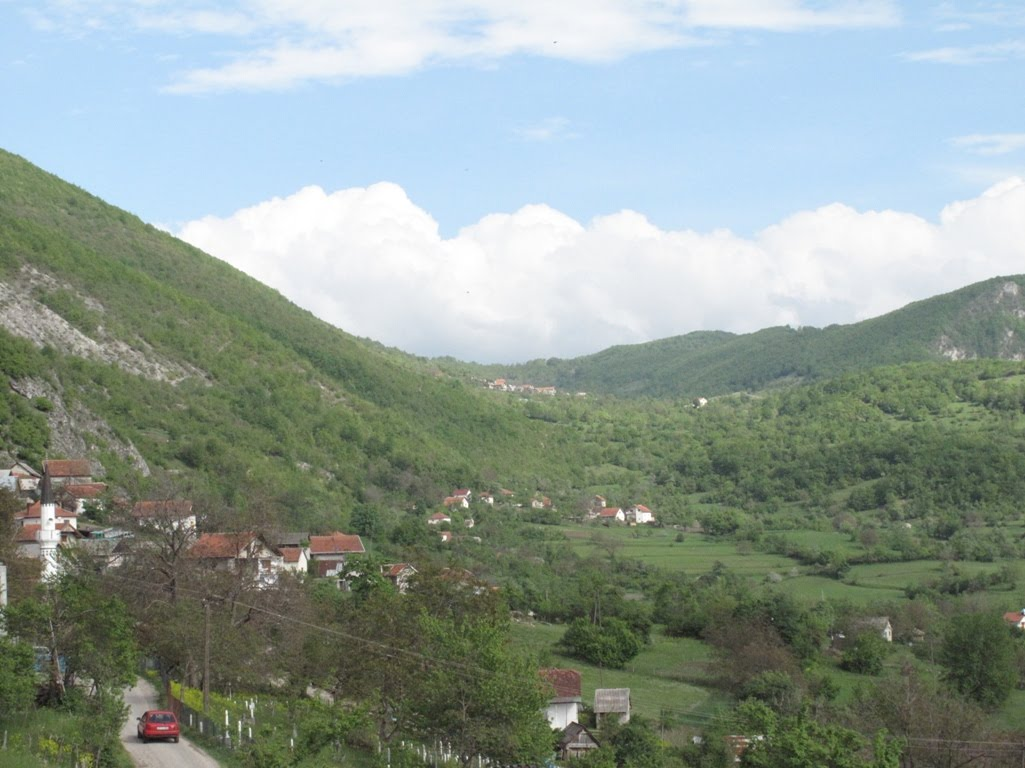

- Location within Bosnia and Herzegovina
- Coordinates: 43°40′N 18°01′E
- Country: Bosnia and Herzegovina
- Entity: Federation of Bosnia and Herzegovina
- Canton: Herzegovina-Neretva
- Municipality: Konjic

Area
  - Total: 11.37 sq mi (29.46 km^{2})

Population (2013)
  - Total: 295
  - Density: 25.9/sq mi (10.0/km^{2})
- Time zone: UTC+1 (CET)
  - Summer (DST): UTC+2 (CEST)

Džepi (Cyrillic: Џепи) is a village in the municipality of Konjic, Bosnia and Herzegovina.

== Demographics ==
According to the 2013 census, its population was 295.

Ethnicity in 2013
| Ethnicity | Number | Percentage |
|---|---|---|
| Bosniaks | 289 | 98.0% |
| Serbs | 3 | 1.0% |
| other/undeclared | 3 | 1.0% |
| Total | 295 | 100% |
