= Konjic =

City in Federation of Bosnia and Herzegovina

- City
- Grad Konjic; City of Konjic
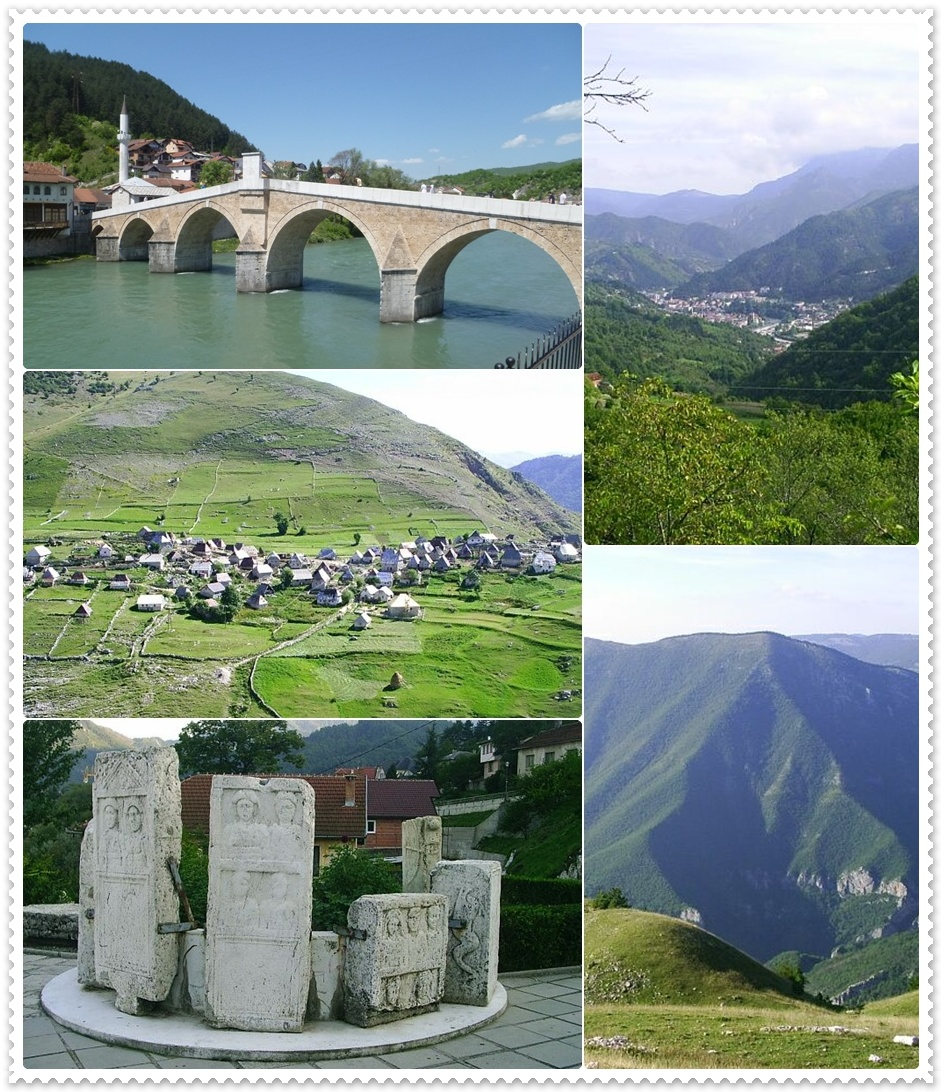

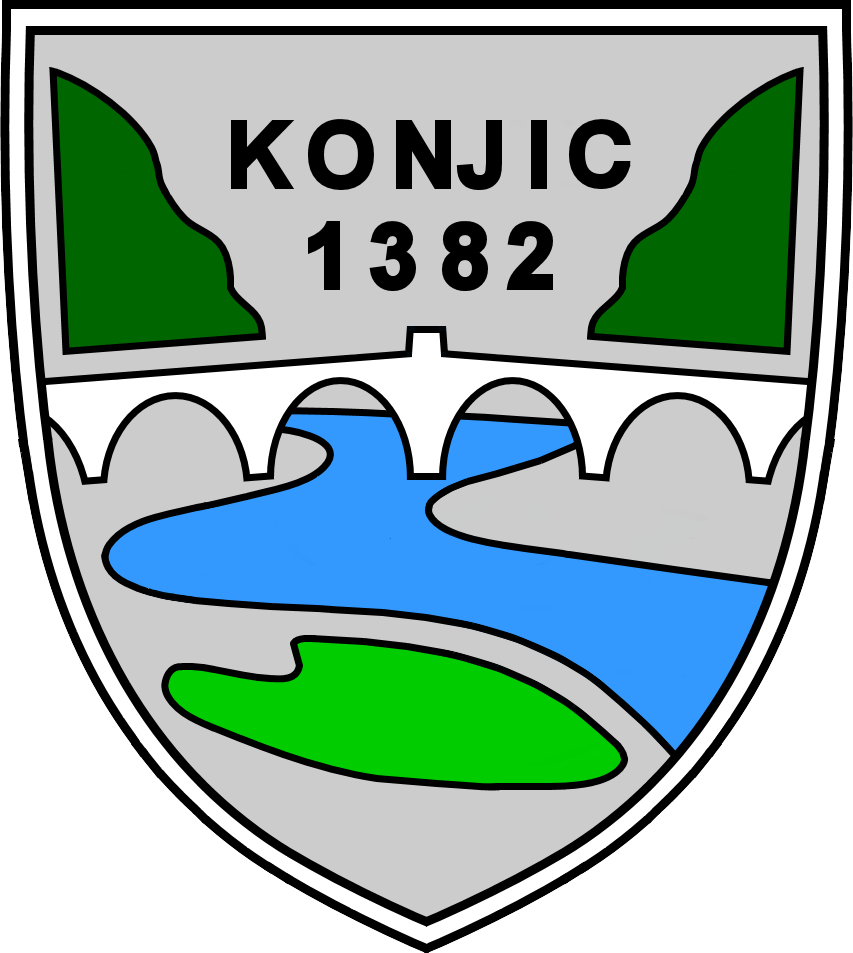
- Coat of arms

- Location of Konjic within Bosnia and Herzegovina

- Location within Bosnia and Herzegovina
- Coordinates: 43°39′15.9″N 17°57′38.8″E
- Country: Bosnia and Herzegovina
- Entity: Federation of Bosnia and Herzegovina
- Canton: Herzegovina-Neretva
- Geographical region: Herzegovina

Government
  - Mayor: Osman Ćatić (SDA)

Area
  - City: 1,169 km^{2} (451 sq mi)

Population (2013 census)
  - City: 25,148
  - Density: 21.51/km^{2} (55.72/sq mi)
  - Urban: 10,732
- Time zone: UTC+1 (CET)
  - Summer (DST): UTC+2 (CEST)
- Area code: +387 36
- Website: www.konjic.ba

Konjic is a city located in the Herzegovina-Neretva Canton of the Federation of Bosnia and Herzegovina, one of two entities that make up Bosnia and Herzegovina. It is located in northern Herzegovina, around 60 kilometres (37 mi) southwest of Sarajevo, in a mountainous, heavily wooded area, and is 268 m (879 ft) above sea level. The municipality extends on both sides of the Neretva River. According to the 2013 census, the city of Konjic has a population of 10,732 inhabitants, whereas the municipality has 25,148.

The city is one of the oldest permanent settlements in Bosnia and Herzegovina, dating back almost 4,000 years; it arose in its current incarnation in the late 14th century.

== History ==
The area near the Konjic is believed to have been settled up to 4,000 years ago, and settlements around 2,000 years ago by Illyrian tribes travelling upstream along the Neretva river have been found. Konjic was earliest recorded by name in the records of the Republic of Ragusa on 16 June 1382.

The town, part of the Kingdom of Bosnia, was conquered by the Ottoman Empire, of which the lasting feature for the town (apart from the many mosques and bringing of Islamic faith) is the Ottoman-inspired bridge Stara Ćuprija which features in the town's coat of arms, and later into the Austro-Hungarian Empire.

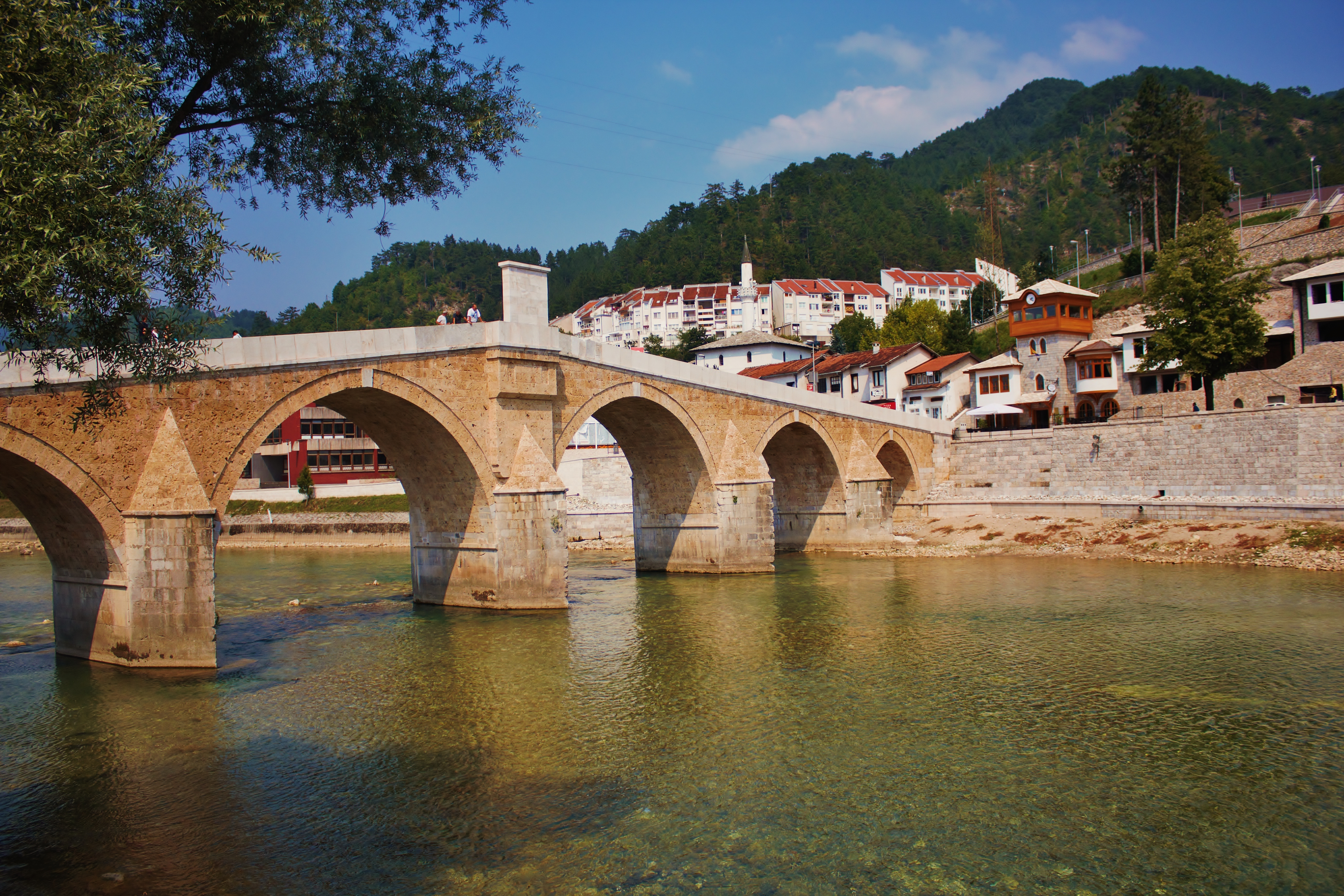
Konjic bridge

After World War I, the town, along with the rest of Bosnia and Herzegovina, became part of the Kingdom of Serbs, Croats and Slovenes later renamed Kingdom of Yugoslavia in 1929.

During World War II, the town became part of the Independent State of Croatia. When the German and Italian Zones of Influence were revised on 24 June 1942, Konjic fell in Zone III, administered civilly by Croatia and militarily by Croatia and Germany.

Following the war joined the Socialist Federal Republic of Yugoslavia. Between 1953 and 1979, a 611 square-metre atomic bunker, dug 300 metres into a mountain, known as ARK, was built secretly by the government in the Konjic municipality.

The town grew significantly and prospered as a vibrant, multi-ethnic town with good transportation links (the town is on the railway between Sarajevo and the Adriatic Sea), the large Igman ammunition factory and Yugoslav Army barracks. These factors became one of the main reasons for the town's conflict in the 1990s.

=== During the Bosnian War ===
During conflict in Yugoslavia, Konjic municipality was of strategic importance as it contained important communication links from Sarajevo to southern Bosnia and Herzegovina. Several important military facilities were contained in Konjic, including the Igman arms and ammunition factory, the JNA Ljuta barracks, the Reserve Command Site of the JNA, the Zlatar communications and telecommunications centre, and the Celebici barracks and warehouses.

Although the Konjic municipality did not have a majority Serb population and was not part of the declared "Serb autonomous regions", in March 1992, the self-styled "Serb Konjic Municipality" adopted a decision on the Serbian territories. The SDS, in co-operation with the JNA, had also been active in arming the Serb population of the municipality and in training paramilitary units and militias. Konjic was included in those areas claimed by Croats in Bosnia and Herzegovina as part of the "Croatian Community of Herzeg-Bosnia", despite the fact that the Croats did not constitute a majority of the population there either (just a quarter of population in 1991, as the municipality was mixed). Croatian units (known as the HVO) were established and armed in the municipality by April 1992.

Following the international recognition of the independent Bosnia and Herzegovina and the walk-out of SDS representatives from the Municipal Assembly a War Assembly was formed to take charge of the defence of the municipality. Between 20 April and early May 1992 Bosnian government forces seized control over most of the strategic assets of the Municipality and some armaments. However, Serb forces controlled the main access points to the municipality, effectively cutting it off from outside supply. Bosniaks and Croats began to arrive in the city of Konjic from surrounding villages, while Serb inhabitants moved to Serb-controlled villages.

On 4 May 1992, the first shells landed in Konjic town, fired by the JNA and other Serb forces from the slopes of Borasnica and Kisera. This shelling, which continued daily for over three years, until the signing of the Dayton Peace Agreement, inflicted substantial damage and resulted in the loss of many lives as well as rendering conditions for the surviving population even more unbearable. With the town swollen from the influx of refugees, there was a great shortage of accommodation as well as food and other basic necessities.

Charitable organisations attempted to supply the local people with enough food but all systems of production foundered or were destroyed. It was not until August or September of that year that convoys from the United Nations High Commissioner for Refugees (UNHCR) managed to reach the town, and all communications links were cut off with the rest of the State. A clear priority for the Konjic authorities was the de-blocking of the routes to Sarajevo and Mostar. This objective required that the Serbian forces holding Bradina and Donje Selo, as well as those at Borci and other strategic points, be disarmed. Initially, an attempt was made at negotiation with the SDS and other representatives of the Serb people in Bradina and Donje Selo. This did not, however, achieve success for the Konjic authorities and plans were made for the launching of military operations by the Joint Command.

The first area to be targeted was the village of Donje Selo. On 20 May 1992 forces of the TO and HVO entered the village. Bosnian government soldiers moved through Viniste towards the villages of Cerići and Bjelovčina. Cerići, which was the first shelled, was attacked around 22 May and some of its inhabitants surrendered. The village of Bjelovčina was also attacked around that time. According to witnesses heard by the ICTY, the Serb-populated village of Bradina was shelled in the late afternoon and evening of 25 May and then soldiers in both camouflage and black uniforms appeared, firing their weapons and setting fire to buildings. Many of the population sought to flee and some withdrew to the centre of the village. These people were, nonetheless, arrested at various times around 27 and 28 May, by TO, HVO and MUP soldiers and police. The village of Bradina was burned to the ground and at least 43 or 48 Serb civilians were killed.

These military operations resulted in the arrest of many members of the Serb population and it was thus necessary to create a facility where they could be imprisoned and questioned about their role in the siege of Konjic. The former JNA Čelebići compound was chosen out of necessity as the appropriate facilities for the detention of prisoners in Konjic. The majority of the prisoners who were detained between April and December 1992 were men, captured during and after the military operations at Bradina and Donje Selo and their surrounding areas. At the end of May, several groups were transferred to the Čelebići prison camp from various locations. Most of them were civilians. Many were elderly or infirm. From the camp's establishment to its closure, detainees were subjected to murder, beatings, torture, sexual assaults and otherwise cruel and inhumane treatment. Two women who were kept in the camp were also raped.

In its judgement in the Delalić case the ICTY sentenced camp deputy commander Hazim Delić, guard Esad Landžo, and commander Zdravko Mucić 20 years, 15 years and 7 years respectively for their roles in the crimes committed at the camp while Zejnil Delalić was acquitted. In 2017, Bosnian prosecutors charged former members of the Bosnian Army with crimes against humanity against Serbs, with the aim of expelling them from Konjic and surrounding villages in May 1992.

== Cultural heritage ==
=== Stara Ćuprija bridge ===
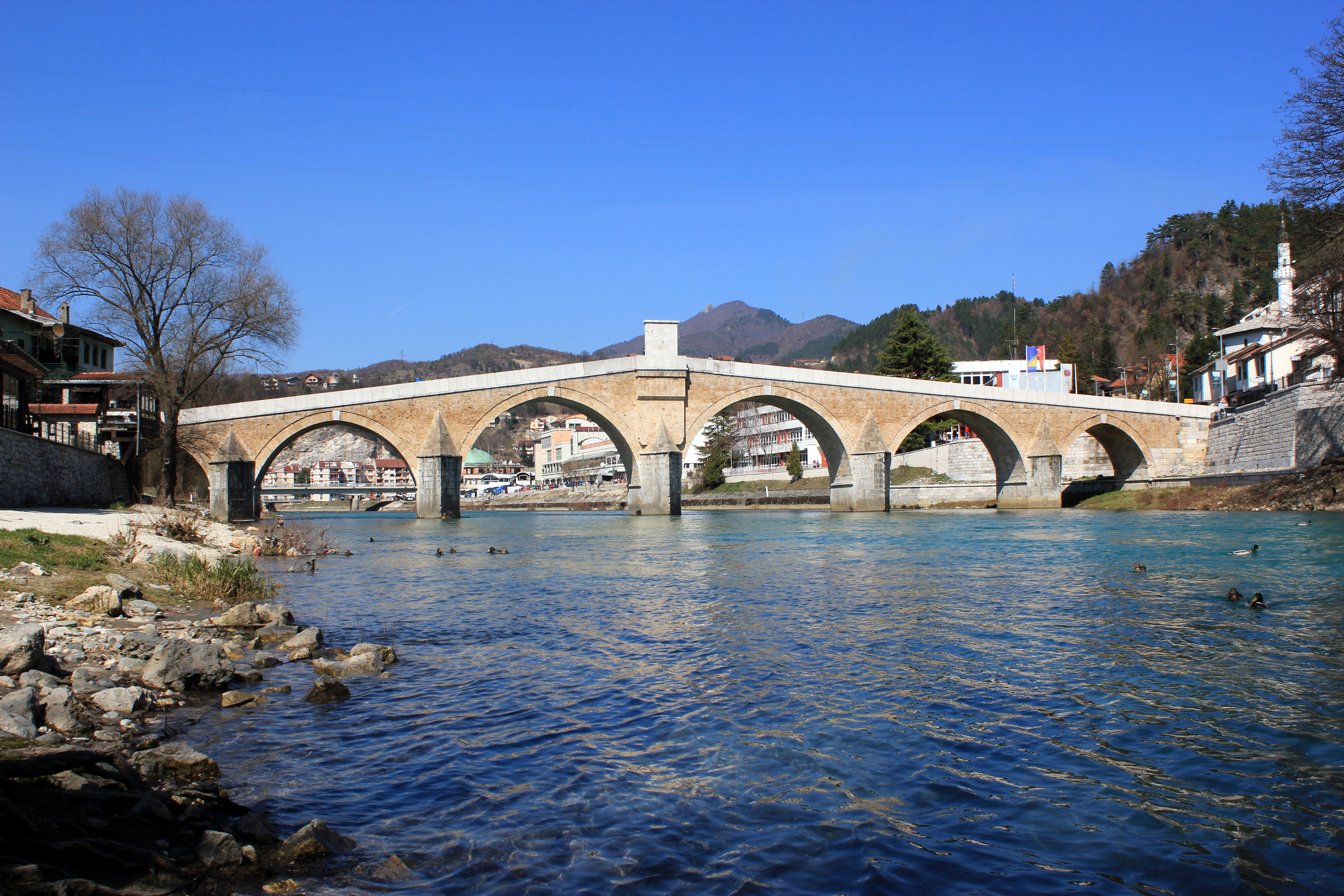
Konjic bridge 1682–1683

The Stara Ćuprija bridge was built between 1682 and 1683 by Ali-aga Hasečić (as shown by a stone plaque at the centre of the bridge). It was built over six slightly pointed stone arches. It is one of the best preserved Ottoman bridges in Bosnia and Herzegovina. The arches were destroyed by the retreating German army in March 1945. The bridge was rebuilt in its original state between 2003 and 2009. The bridge is now proclaimed a National Monument of Bosnia and Herzegovina.

=== D-0 ARK Underground Biennal of Contemporary Art ===
Konjic hosts a Biennial of Contemporary Art since 2011, called "D-0 ARK Underground" which is located in ARK. The project, which the Council of Europe called the best cultural event in 2001, was curated by Petar Cuković, Branislav Dimitrijević in 2011 and Branko Franceschi and Bashak Shenove in 2013.

=== Medieval stećci ===
Medieval Stećci park by the Neretva River, Konjic

Konjic specifically is a major stećci hub. Stećci are medieval tombstone monuments unique to the Bosnia-Herzegovina/western Balkans region, carved mostly from limestone between the 12th and 16th centuries. Konjic has 4,160 medieval tombstones spread across 150 necropolises, making it the second-richest city in Bosnia and Herzegovina for this type of monument. The town's small parks and public spaces often display stećci gathered from surrounding village necropolises rather than leaving them scattered in remote fields.

== Natural heritage ==
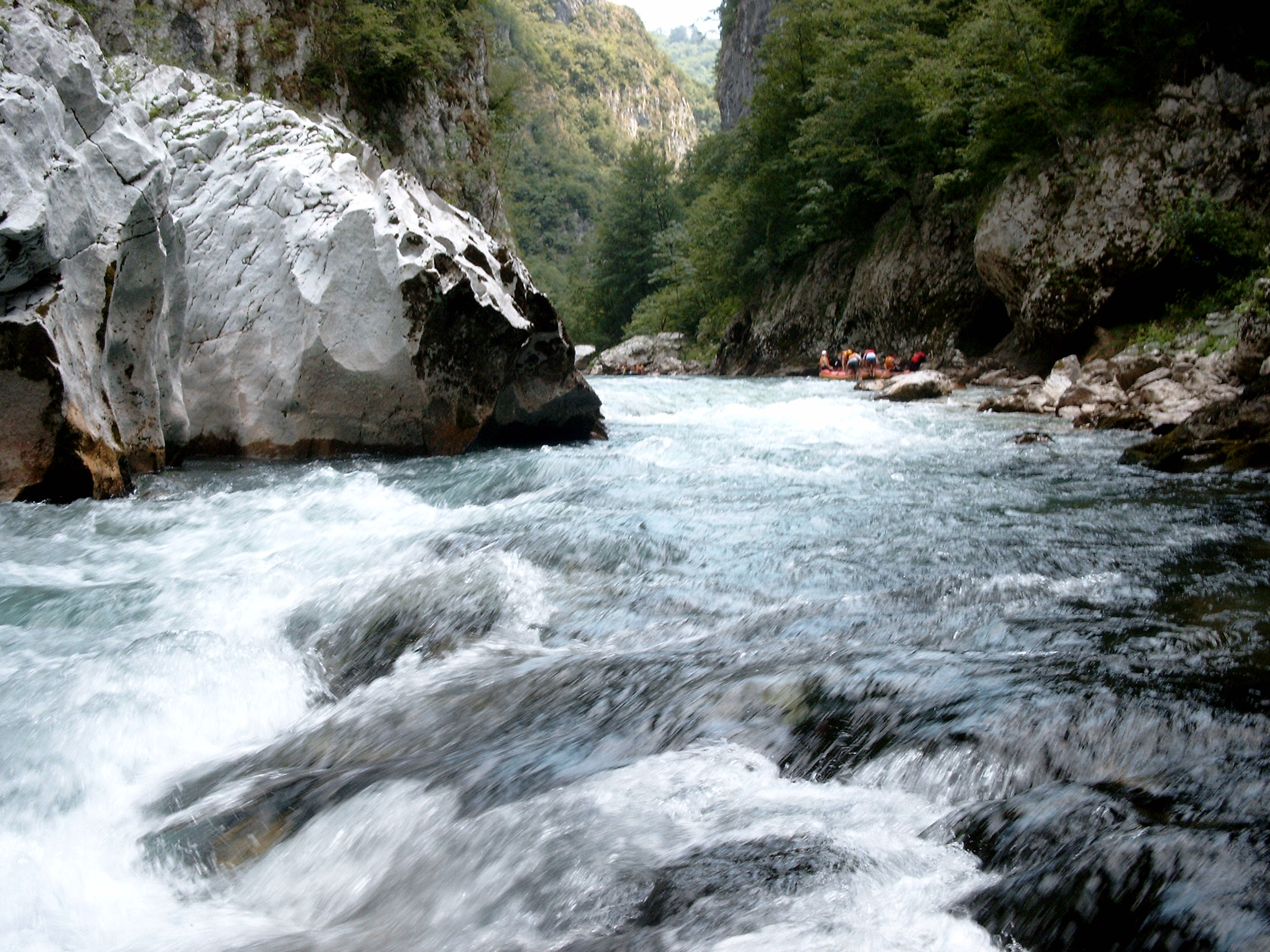
The Čepa Canyon on the Neretva, just few kilometers upstream from the center of Konjic.

=== Neretva river ===
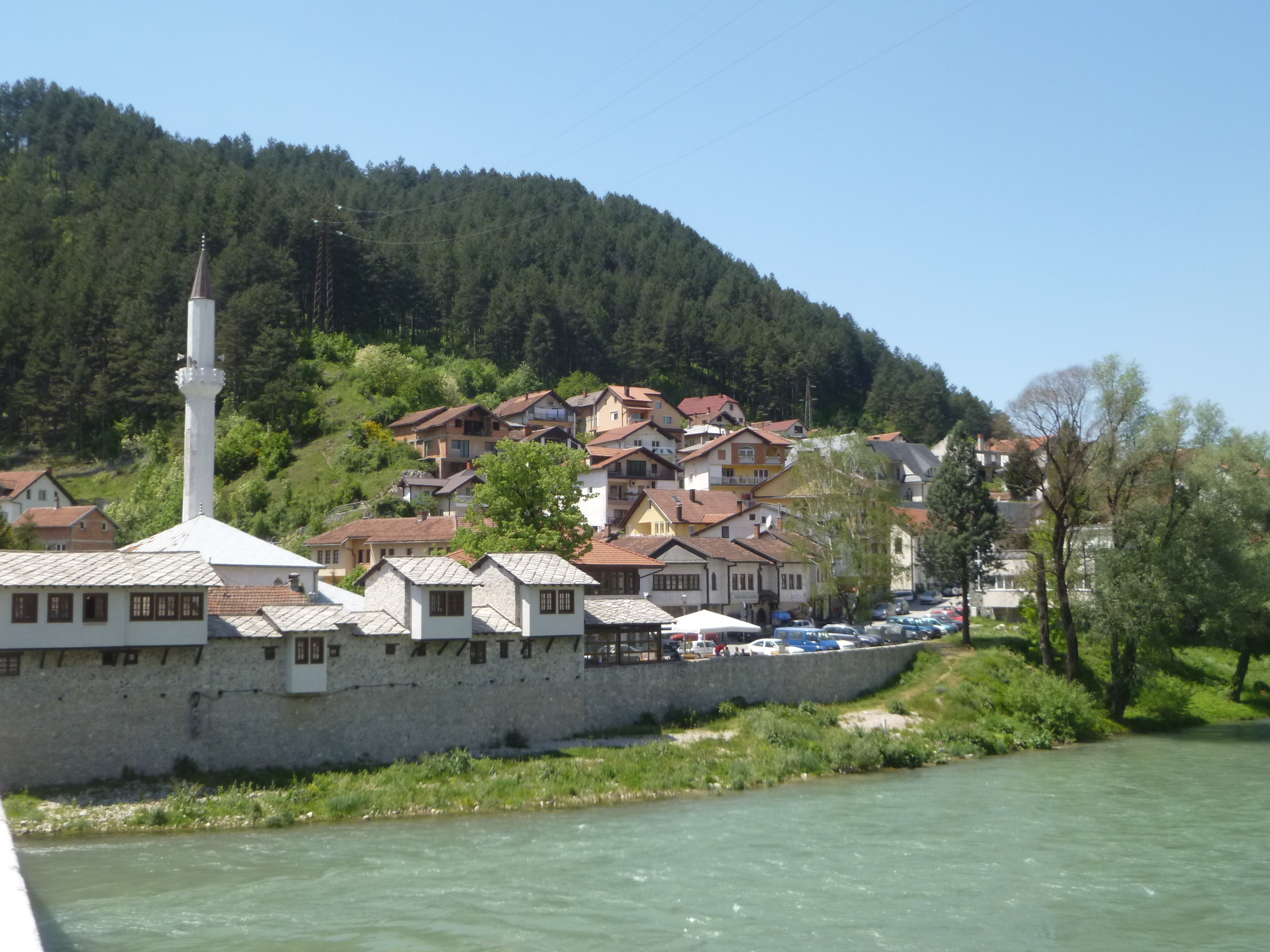
Neretva river at Konjic

The Neretva river is the largest karst river in the Dinaric Alps in the entire eastern part of the Adriatic basin, which belongs to the Adriatic river watershed. The total length is 230 km (140 mi), of which 208 km (129 mi) are in Bosnia and Herzegovina, while the final 22 km (14 mi) are in the Dubrovnik-Neretva County of Croatia.

The municipality of Konjic includes at least half of the area of the Upper Neretva (Bosnian: Gornja Neretva), which is the upper course of the Neretva river. Geographically and hydrologically the Neretva is divided into three sections.

The upper course of the Neretva river is simply called the Upper Neretva (Bosnian: Gornja Neretva), and includes a vast area around the Neretva, numerous streams and well-springs, three major glacial lakes near the river (and even more lakes, outside the municipality of Konjic, scattered across the mountains of Treskavica and Zelengora in the wider area of the Upper Neretva), one artificial lake (Jablaničko), mountains and forests, and native flora and fauna. All this natural heritage together with the cultural heritage of the Upper Neretva, represent rich and valuable resources of Bosnia and Herzegovina as well as Europe.

The Upper Neretva has water of Class I purity and is almost certainly the coldest river water in the world, often as low as 7–8 °C (45–46 °F) in the summer months.

=== Rakitnica river ===
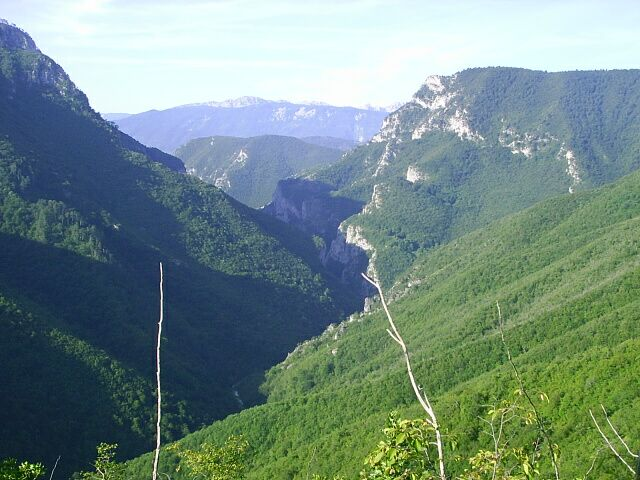
The Rakitnica Canyon, one of the last remaining true wilderness of Europe.

The Rakitnica river is the main tributary of the Upper Neretva. The Rakitnica forms a 26 km (16 mi)-long canyon (of its 32 km (20 mi) length), that stretches between Bjelašnica and Visočica to the southeast of Sarajevo. There is a hiking trail along the ridge of the canyon, at a level of 800 m (2,600 ft) above the river, all the way to the village of Lukomir. Lukomir is the only remaining traditional semi-nomadic Bosniak mountain village in Bosnia and Herzegovina.

At almost 1,500 m (4,900 ft), the village of Lukomir, with its unique stone homes with cherry-wood roof tiles, is the highest and most isolated mountain village in the country. Indeed, access to the village is impossible from the first snows in December until late April and sometimes even later, except by skis or on foot. A newly constructed lodge is now complete to receive guests and hikers.

=== Boračko lake ===
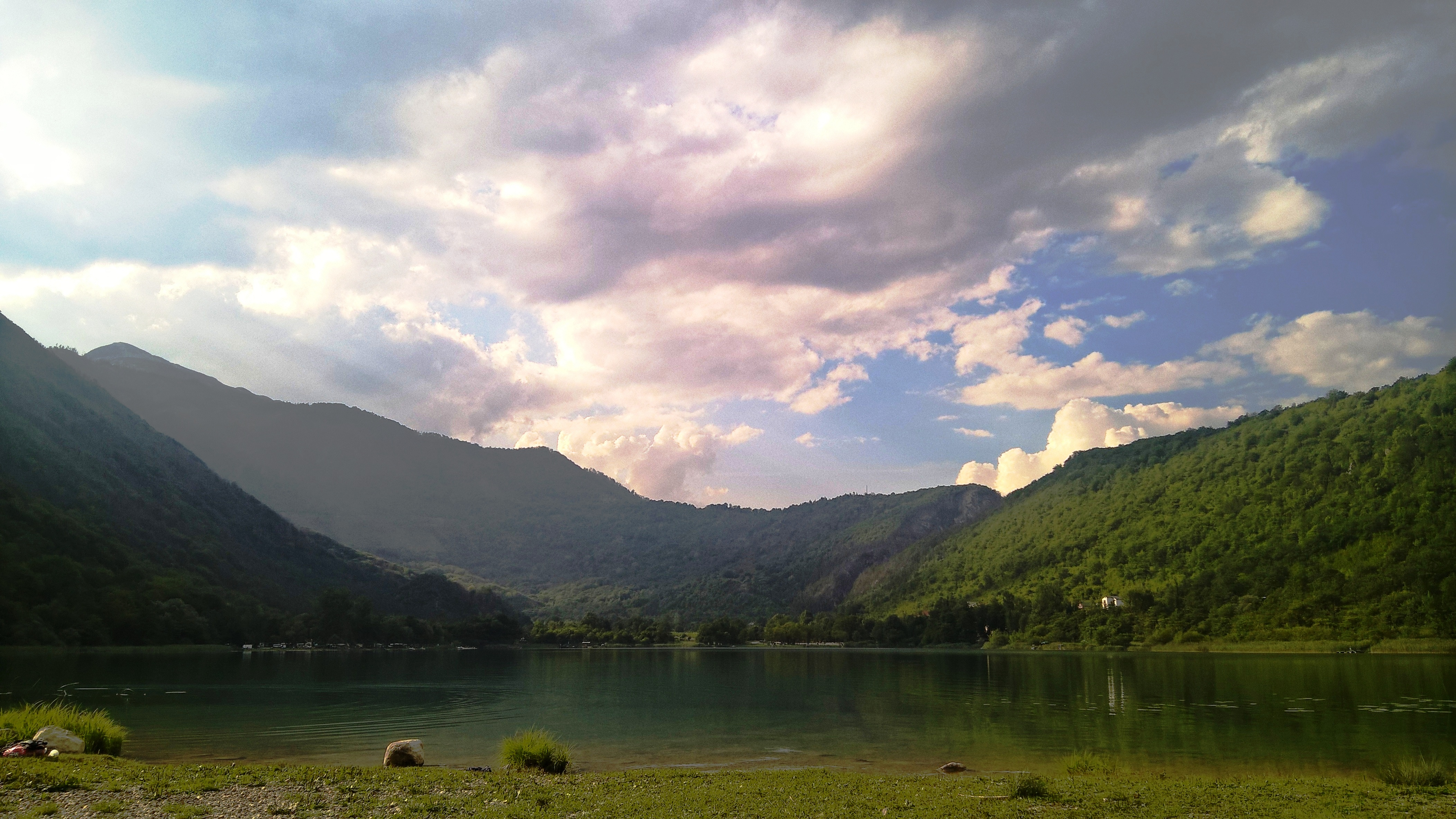
Boračko Lake under the Prenj massif is the largest glacial lake in Bosnia and Herzegovina and among largest high-altitude (montane's) glacial lake in the Balkans.

=== Jablaničko lake ===
Jablaničko Lake (Bosnian: Jablaničko jezero) is a large artificially-formed lake on the Neretva river, right below Konjic where the Neretva briefly expands into a wide valley. The river provided much fertile, agricultural land before the lake flooded most of the valley.

The lake was created in 1953 after construction of a high gravitational hydroelectric dam near Jablanica in central Bosnia and Herzegovina.

The lake has an irregular elongated shape. Its width varies along its length. The lake is a popular vacation destination in Bosnia and Herzegovina. Swimming, boating and especially fishing are popular activities on the lake. There are 13 types of fish in the lake's ecosystem. Many weekend cottages have been built along the shores of the lake.

== Endemic and endangered species ==
=== Trout ===
The river Neretva and its tributaries represent the main drainage system in the east Adriatic watershed and the foremost ichthyofaunal habitat of the region. Salmonidae fish from the Neretva basin show considerable variation in morphology, ecology and behaviour. Neretva also has many other endemic and fragile animals that are near extinction. Among the most endangered are three endemic species of Neretva trout: Neretvanska Mekousna (Salmo obtusirostris oxyrhynchus), Zubatak (Salmo dentex) and Glavatica (Salmo marmoratus).

All three endemic trout species of Neretva are endangered mostly due to destruction of the habitat and hybridisation with introduced trouts and illegal fishing as well as poor management of water and fisheries (dams, overfishing, mismanagement).

== Ecology and protection ==
=== Dam problems ===
The benefits brought by dams have often come at a great environmental and social cost, however.

The Neretva and two main tributaries are already harnessed, by four HE power-plants with large dams on Neretva, one HE power-plants with major dam on the Neretva tributary Rama, and two HE power-plants with one major dam on the Trebišnjica river, which is considered as part of the Neretva watershed.

The government of the Federation of Bosnia and Herzegovina entity unveiled plans to build three more hydroelectric power plants with major dams (as over 150.5 meters in height) upstream from the existing plants, beginning with Glavaticevo Hydro Power Plant in the nearby Glavatičevo village, then going even more upstream Bjelimići Hydro Power Plant and Ljubuča Hydro Power Plant located near the villages with the same names; and in addition one more at the Neretva headwaters gorge, near the very source of the river in entity of Republic of Srpska and is strongly opposed and protested by numerous environmentalist organizations and NGOs. who wish for the canyon, considered at least beautiful as the Tara canyon in Bosnia and Herzegovina and nearby Montenegro, to remain untouched and unspoiled, hopefully protected too. The Government Of FBiH was reportedly preparing a parallel plan to form a huge National Park which would include the entire Gornja Neretva (English: Upper Neretva).

== Settlements ==
- Argud
- Bale
- Bare
- Barmiš
- Bijela
- Bjelovčina
- Blace
- Blučići
- Borci
- Boždarevići
- Bradina
- Brđani
- Budišnja Ravan
- Bukovica
- Bukovlje
- Bulatovići
- Bušćak
- Buturović Polje
- Cerići
- Crni Vrh
- Čelebići
- Čelina
- Česim
- Čičevo
- Čuhovići
- Dobričevići
- Dolovi
- Doljani
- Donja Vratna Gora
- Donje Selo
- Donje Višnjevice
- Donji Čažanj
- Donji Gradac
- Donji Nevizdraci
- Donji Prijeslop
- Došćica
- Dubočani
- Dubravice
- Dudle
- Dužani
- Džajići
- Džanići
- Džepi
- Falanovo Brdo
- Gakići
- Galjevo
- Glavatičevo
- Gobelovina
- Gorani
- Goransko Polje
- Gorica
- Gornja Vratna Gora
- Gornje Višnjevice
- Gornji Čažanj
- Gornji Gradac
- Gornji Nevizdraci
- Gostovići
- Grabovci
- Gradeljina
- Grušča
- Hasanovići
- Herići
- Homatlije
- Homolje
- Hondići
- Idbar
- Jasenik
- Javorik
- Jezero
- Ježeprosina
- Jošanica
- Jukići
- Kale
- Kanjina
- Kašići
- Konjic
- Kostajnica
- Koto
- Krajkovići
- Kralupi
- Krtići
- Krupac
- Krušćica
- Kula
- Lađanica
- Lisičići
- Lokva
- Luka
- Lukomir
- Lukšije
- Ljesovina
- Ljubuča
- Ljuta
- Mladeškovići
- Mokro
- Mrkosovice
- Obrenovac
- Obri
- Odžaci
- Orahovica
- Orlište
- Oteležani
- Ovčari
- Pačerani
- Pirići
- Parsovići
- Plavuzi
- Podhum
- Podorašac
- Pokojište
- Polje Bijela
- Požetva
- Prevlje
- Radešine
- Raotići
- Rasvar
- Razići
- Redžići
- Repovci
- Repovica
- Ribari
- Ribići
- Seljani
- Seonica
- Sitnik
- Slavkovići
- Solakova Kula
- Sopot
- Spiljani
- Stojkovići
- Strgonice
- Studenčica
- Sultići
- Svijenča
- Šunji
- Tinje
- Tovarnica
- Treboje
- Trešnjevica
- Trusina
- Tuhobići
- Turija
- Ugošće
- Veluša
- Vinište
- Vrbljani
- Vrci
- Vrdolje
- Zabrđani
- Zabrđe
- Zagorice
- Zaslivlje
- Zukići

== Demographics ==
=== 1971 ===
40,879 total

- Muslims - 21,599 (52.83%)
- Croats - 12,034 (29.43%)
- Serbs - 6,669 (16.31%)
- Yugoslavs - 202 (0.49%)
- Others - 375 (0.94%)

=== 1991 ===
According to the 1991 census, the municipality of Konjic had 43,878 residents: 23,815 ethnic Muslims (54.3%), 11,513 Croats (26.2%), 6,620 Serbs (15.1%), and 1,930 others (4.4%).

=== 2013 Census ===
Municipality	Nationality						Total
Municipality	Bosniaks	%	Croats	%	Serbs	%	Total
Konjic	22,486	89.41	1,553	6.17	355	1.41	25,148

== Sports ==
Local football club FK Igman Konjic plays in Bosnia and Herzegovina's second tier - First League of the Federation of Bosnia and Herzegovina.

== Notable people ==
- Pavao Anđelić, Bosnian lawyer, archaeologist and historian.
- Tijana Arnautović, Bosnian-Canadian model
- Arijana Boras, alpine skier and three-time Olympian
- Mensur Cakić, gold medal winner at the 2006 European Karate Championships, head coach of Kuwait national karate team
- Aldin Čajić, footballer
- Hazim Delić, Bosniak deputy commander and convicted war criminal
- Lazar Drljača, bohemian painter
- Zulfikar Džumhur, bohemian writer, painter and caricaturist
- Anel Hebibović, footballer
- Dragan Jakovljević, footballer
- Davor Jozić, footballer
- Žarko Karišik Durmitara, scientist and writer
- Senadin Lavić, scientist, president of BZK (Bošnjačka zajednica kulture) Preporod
- Ante Marković, last prime minister of the Socialist Federal Republic of Yugoslavia
- Nermin Nikšić, Prime Minister of the Federation of Bosnia and Herzegovina
- Ante Pavelić, Poglavnik, Fascist leader of the Axis powers allied Independent State of Croatia
- Smail Prevljak, footballer
- Kasim Prohić, philosopher
- Justin Tipuric, Rugby union player has family roots in the town

== Twin towns – sister cities ==
Konjic is twinned with:

- Altınova, Turkey
- Karacabey, Turkey
- Tivat, Montenegro
- Anamur, Turkey

== Gallery ==
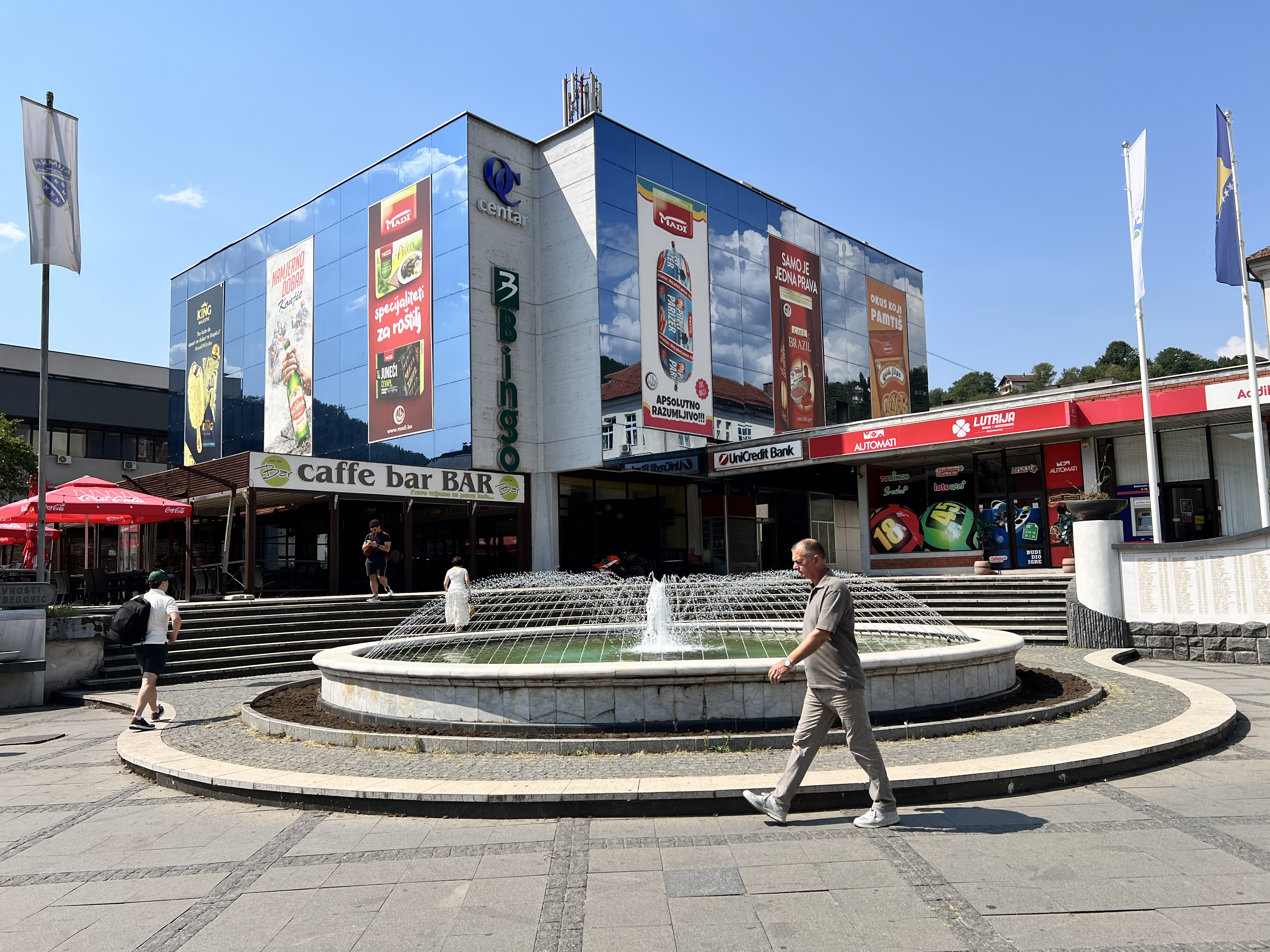
Shopping centre in the centre of the town.

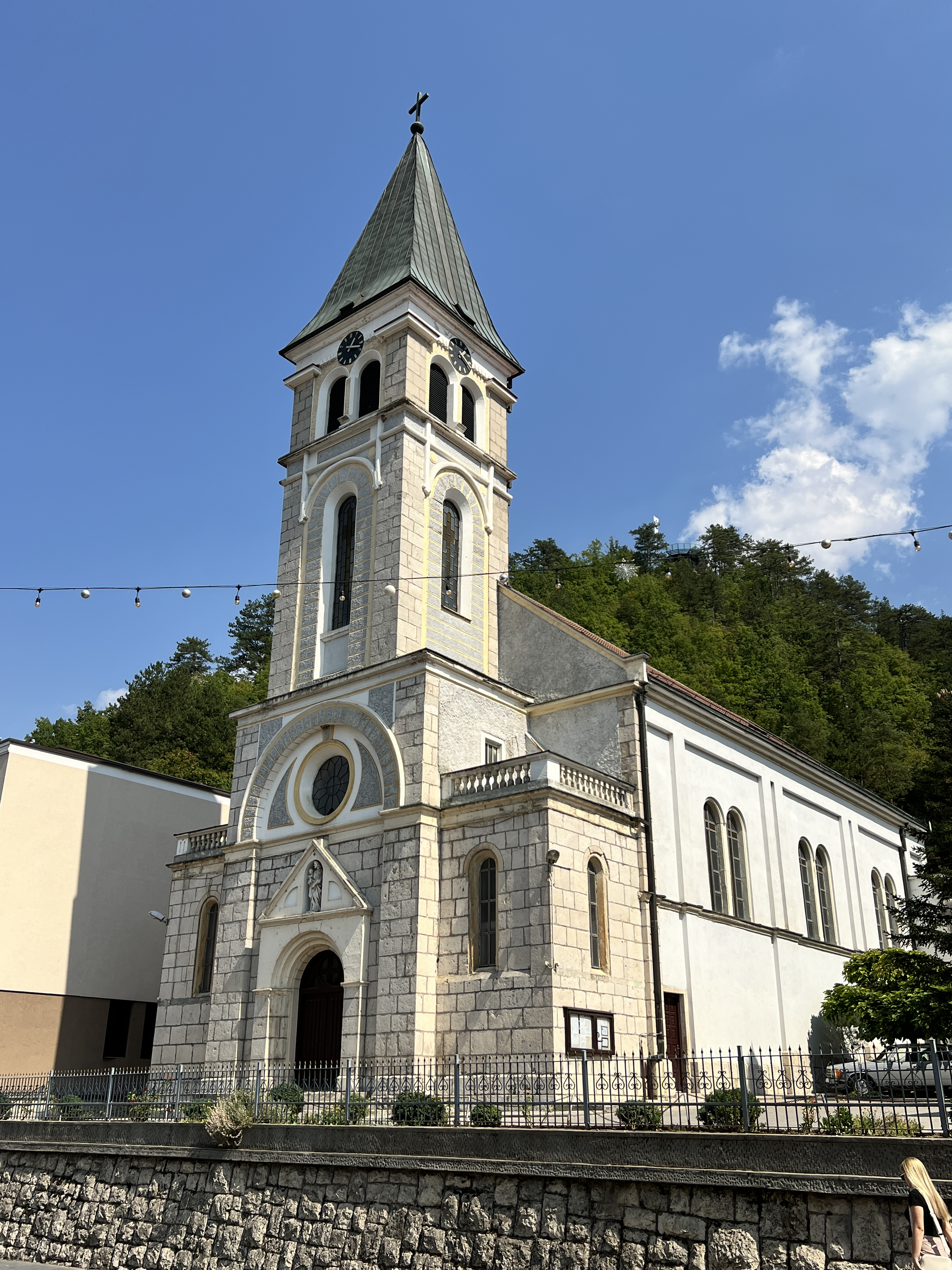
Church of St. John the Baptist ("Crkva sv. Ivana Krstitelja").

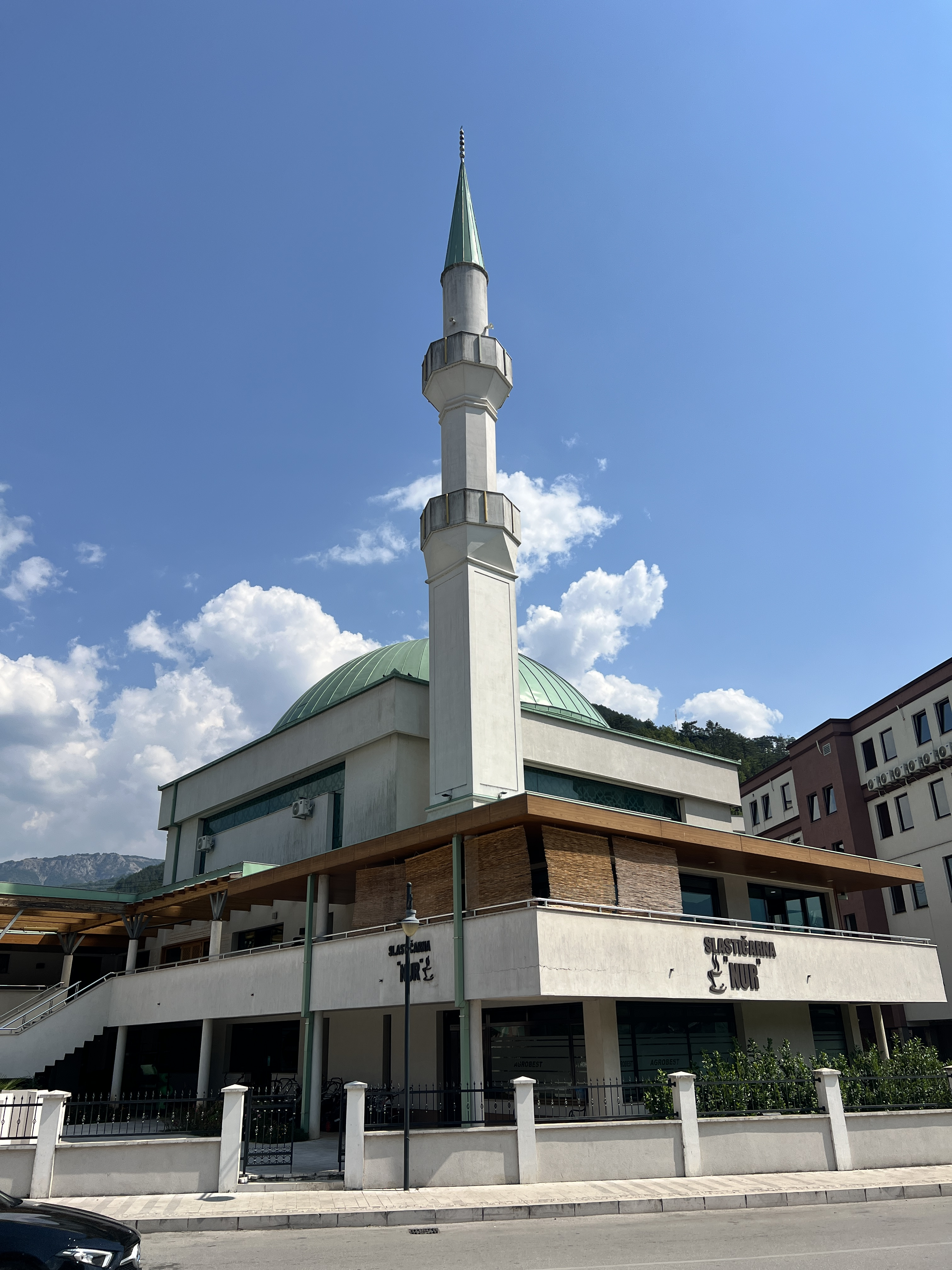
City mosque ("Gradska džamija Konjic").

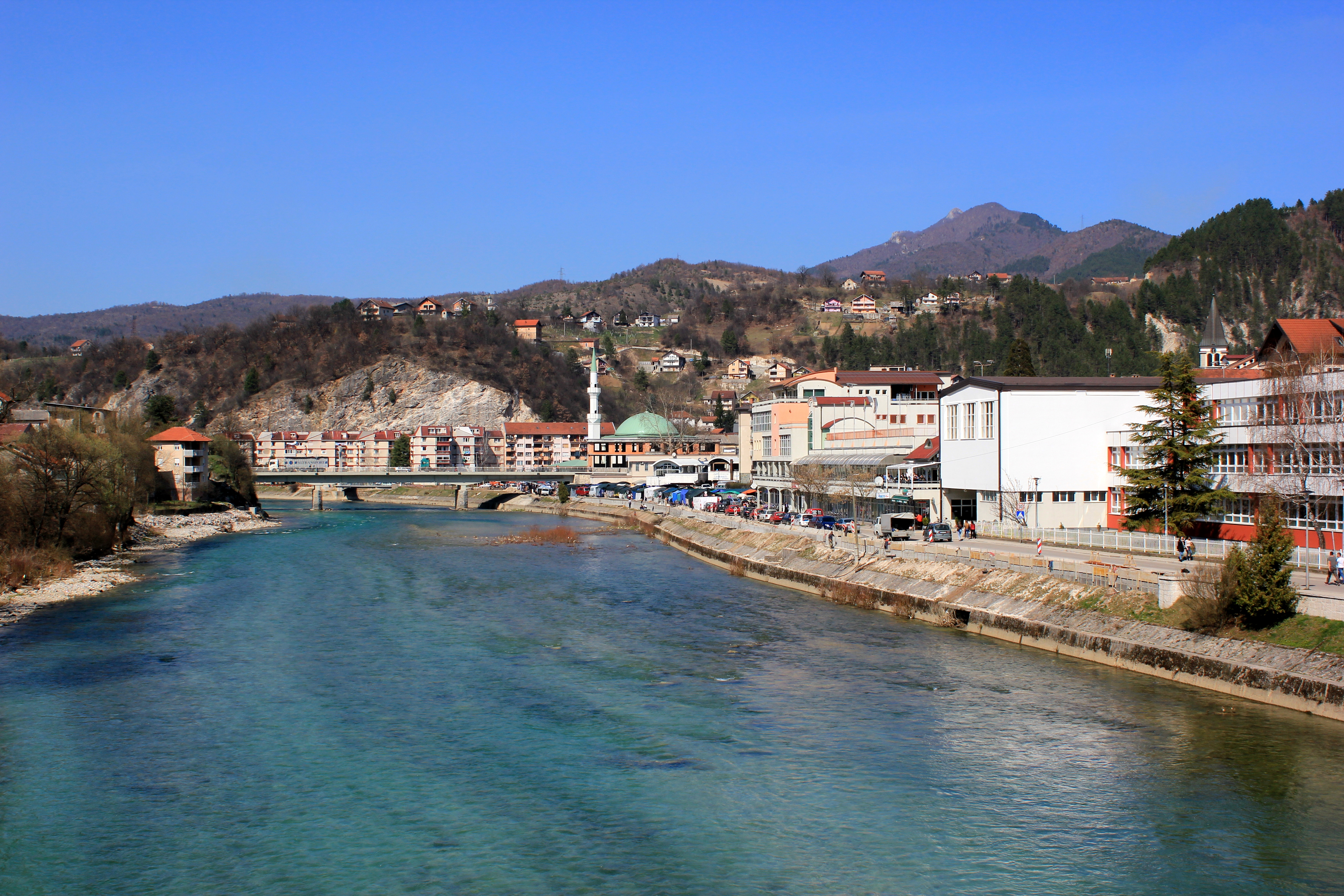
View of Neretva river and part of the city from Konjic bridge.

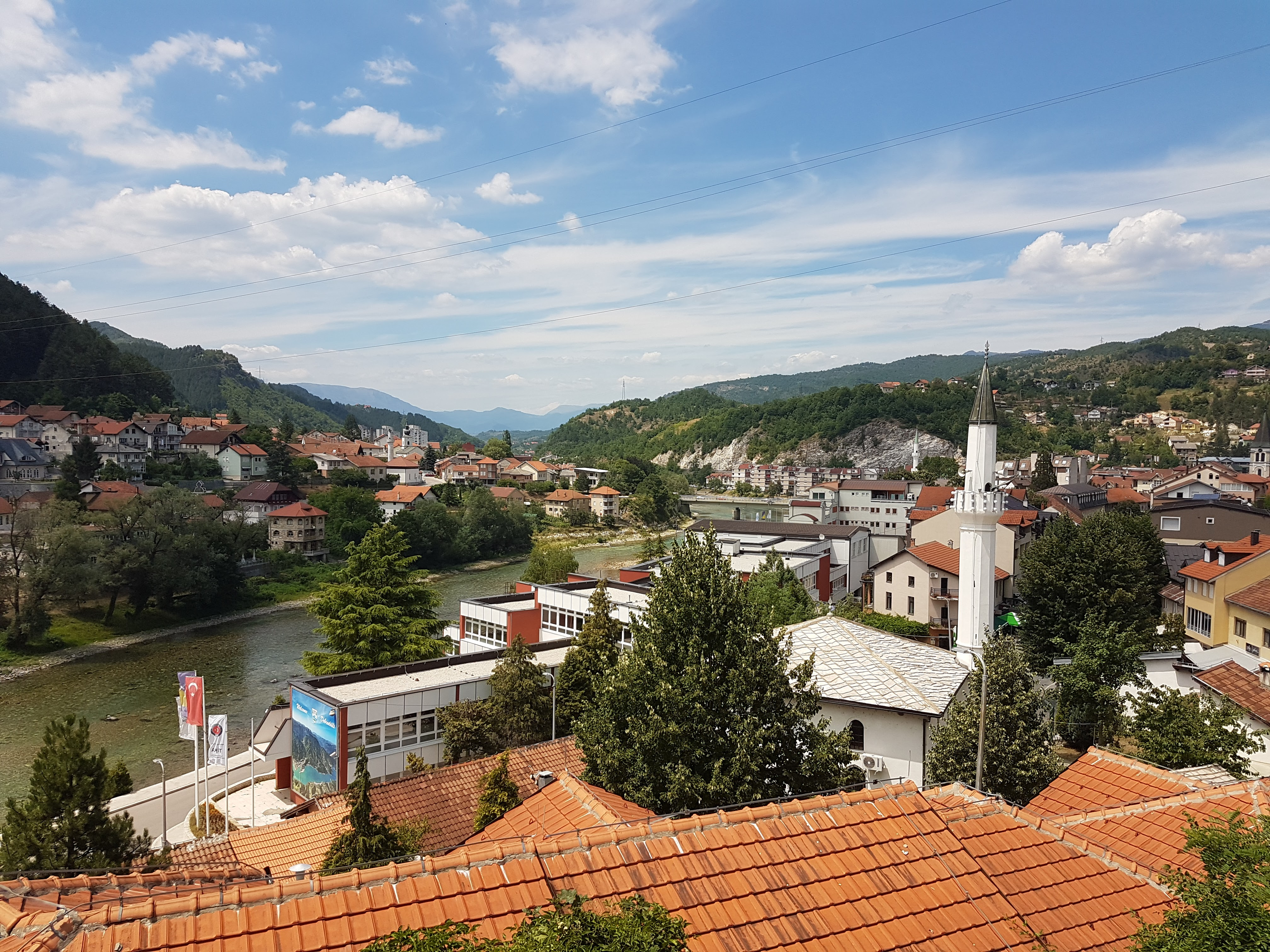
Different view of the city.

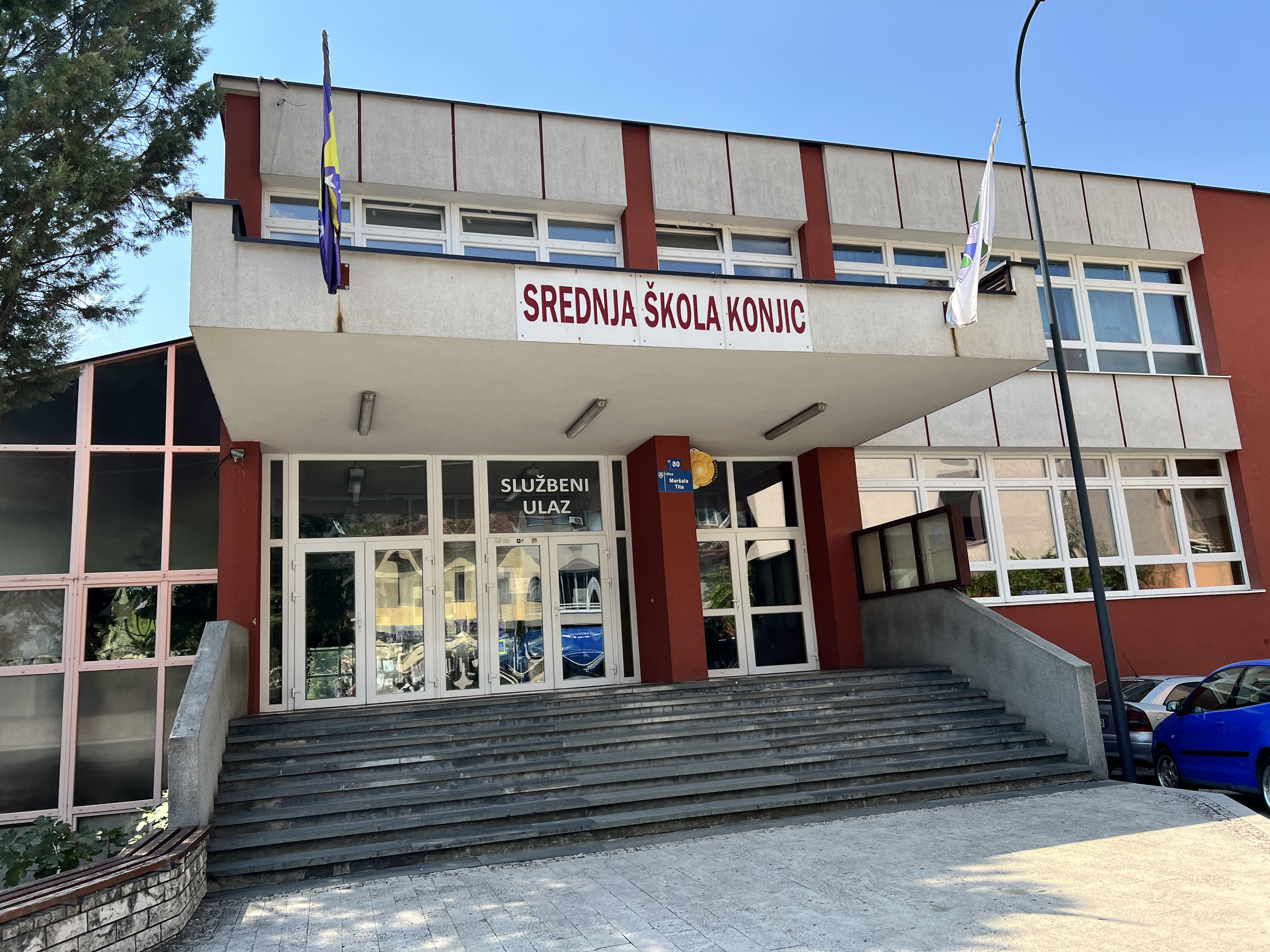
Entrance to the high school ("Srednja škola Konjic").

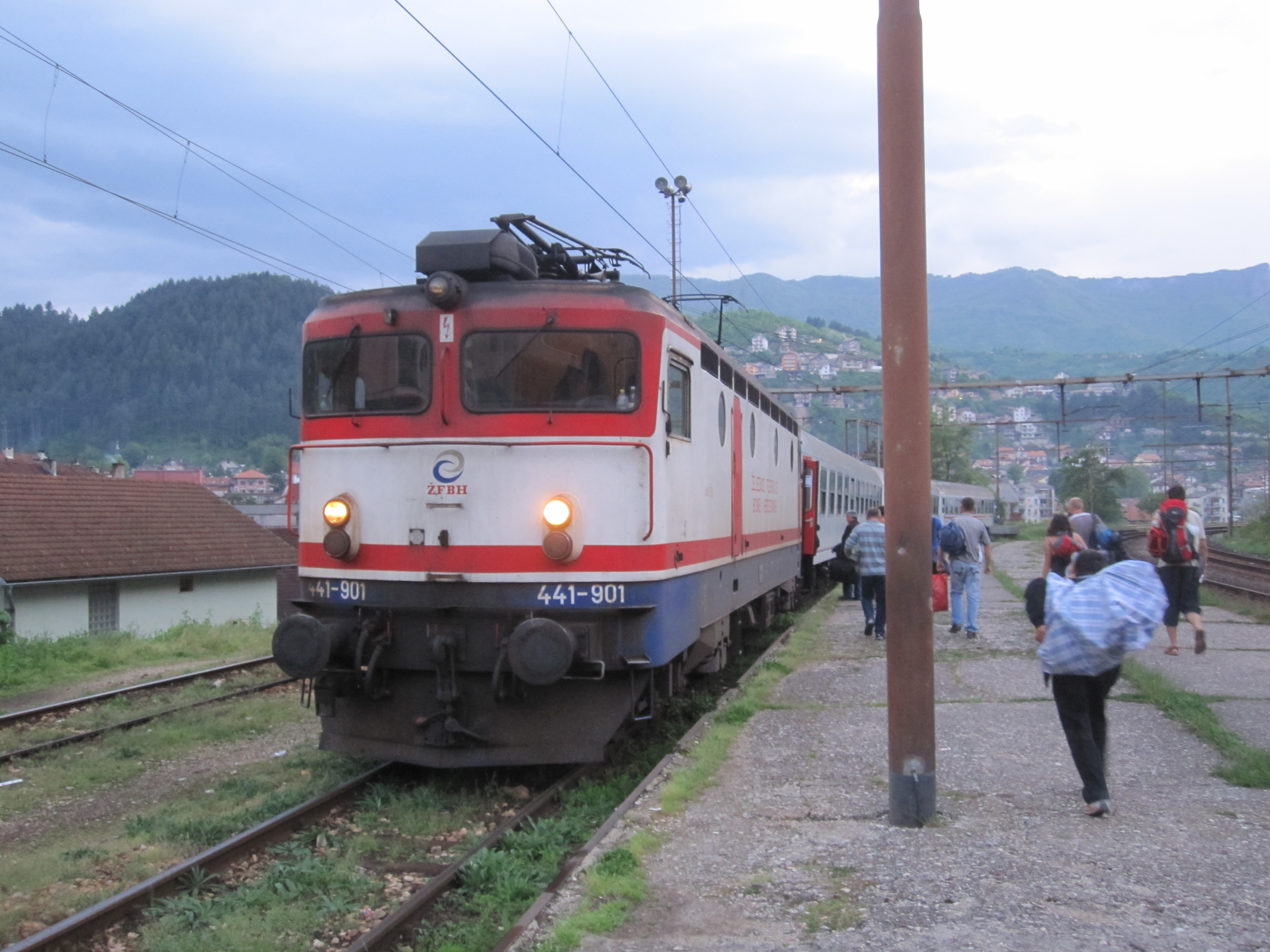
Train arriving in Konjic station (2011).

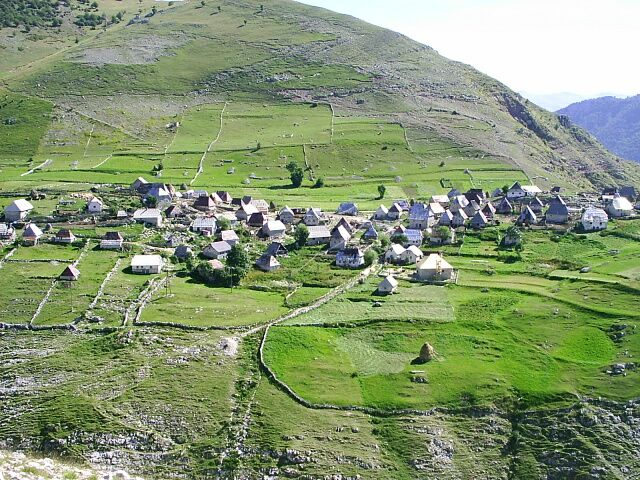
Village of Lukomir.

== See also ==
- Konjic Hydro Power Plant

== Bibliography ==
- Trgo, Fabijan, ed. (1964). Zbornik dokumenata i podataka o Narodno-oslobodilačkom ratu Jugoslovenskih naroda. Vol. V, 32.
