= Džanići =

Džanići Џанићи
- Village
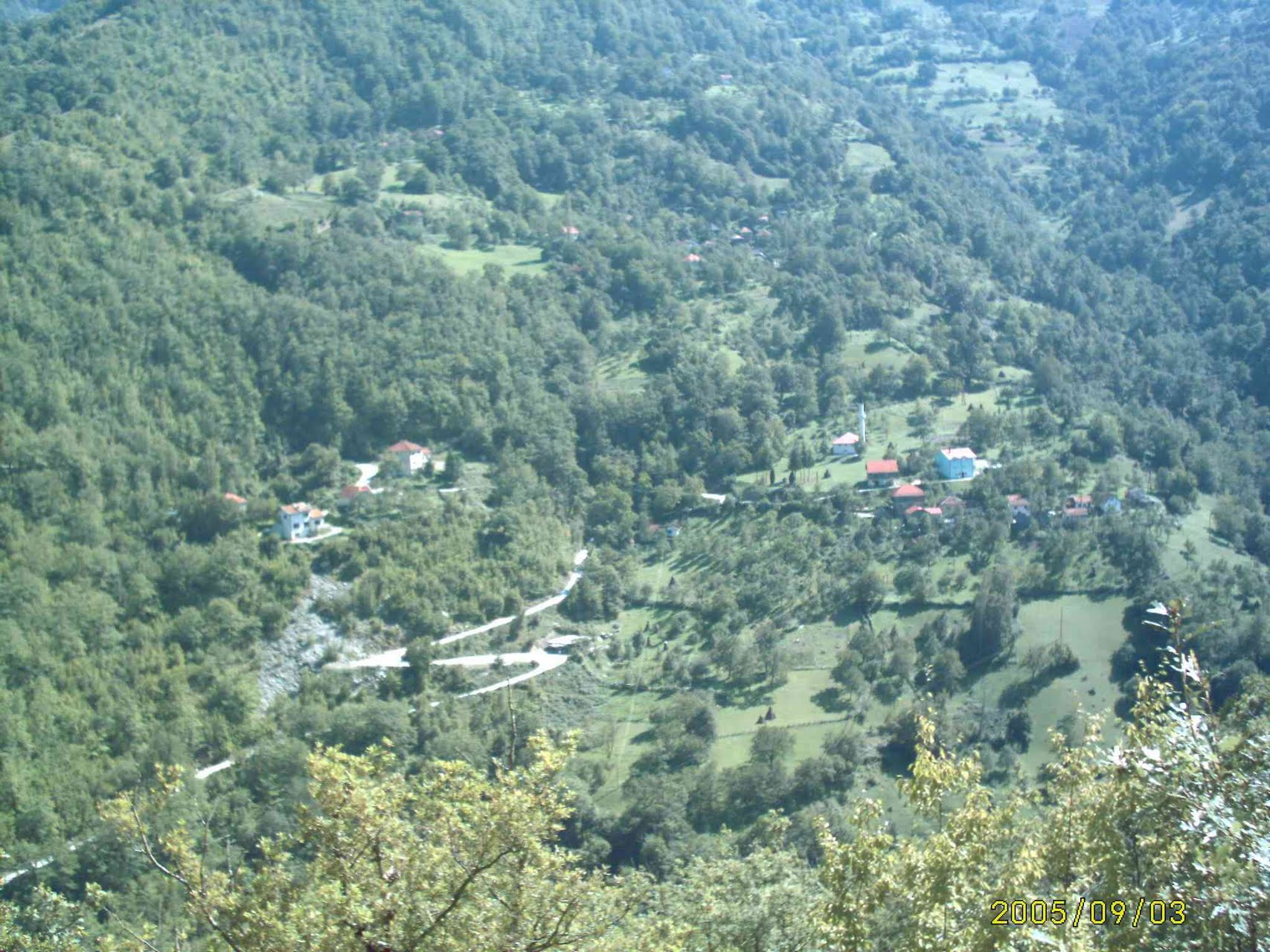

- Location within Bosnia and Herzegovina
- Coordinates: 43°48′N 17°51′E
- Country: Bosnia and Herzegovina
- Entity: Federation of Bosnia and Herzegovina
- Canton: Herzegovina-Neretva
- Municipality: Konjic

Area
  - Total: 0.12 sq mi (0.32 km^{2})

Population (2013)
  - Total: 12
  - Density: 97/sq mi (38/km^{2})
- Time zone: UTC+1 (CET)
  - Summer (DST): UTC+2 (CEST)

Džanići (Cyrillic: Џанићи) is a village in the municipality of Konjic, Bosnia and Herzegovina.

== Demographics ==
According to the 2013 census, its population was 12, all Bosniaks.
