= Džajići =

Džajići Џајићи
- Village
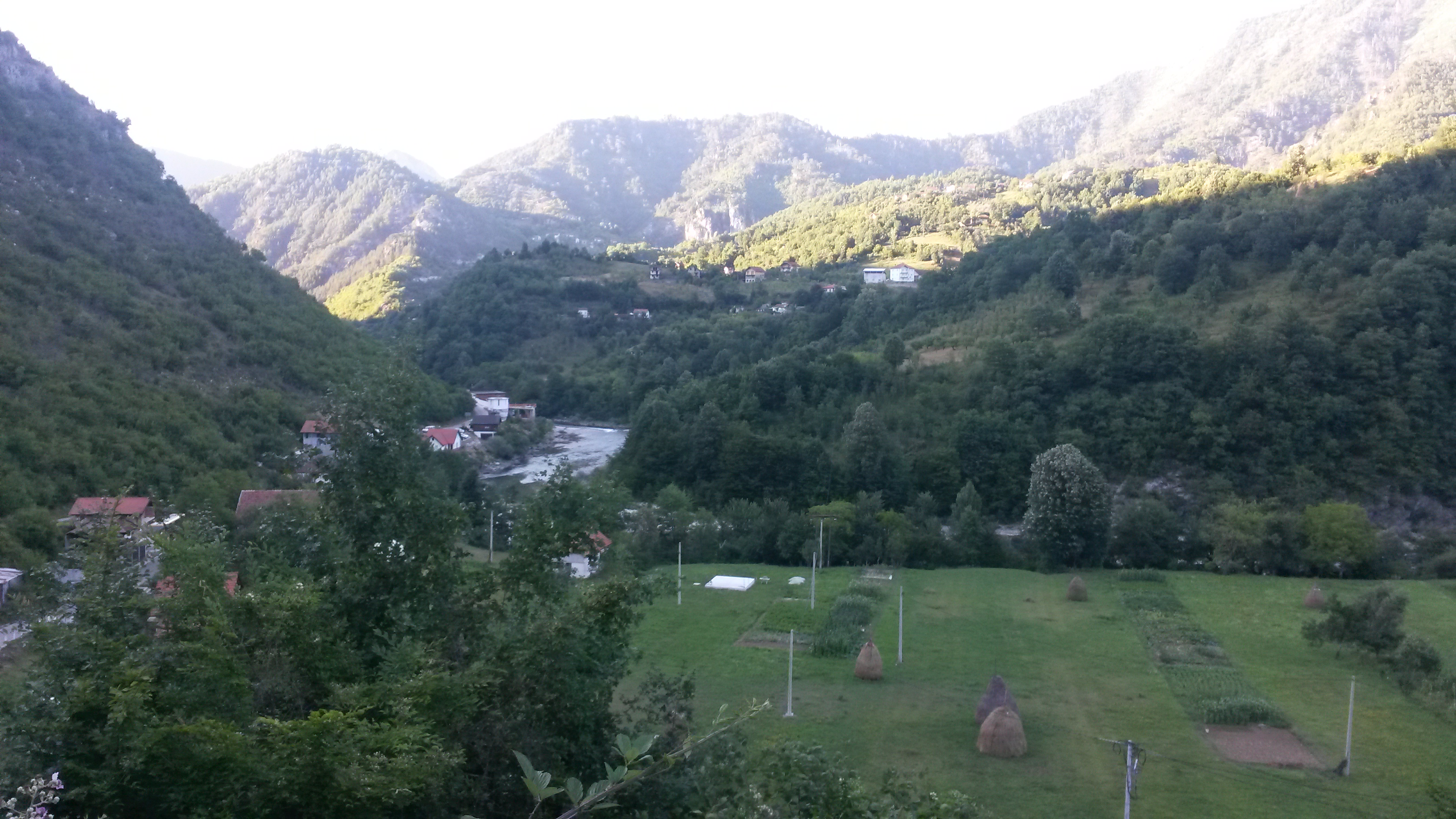

- Location within Bosnia and Herzegovina
- Coordinates: 43°36′36″N 18°00′58″E
- Country: Bosnia and Herzegovina
- Entity: Federation of Bosnia and Herzegovina
- Canton: Herzegovina-Neretva
- Municipality: Konjic

Area
  - Total: 3.28 sq mi (8.50 km^{2})

Population (2013)
  - Total: 103
  - Density: 31.4/sq mi (12.1/km^{2})
- Time zone: UTC+1 (CET)
  - Summer (DST): UTC+2 (CEST)

Džajići (Cyrillic: Џајићи) is a village in the municipality of Konjic, Bosnia and Herzegovina.

== Demographics ==
According to the 2013 census, its population was 103.

Ethnicity in 2013
Ethnicity	Number	Percentage
Bosniaks	90	87.4%
other/undeclared	13	12.6%
Total	103	100%
