= Seljani, Konjic =

Seljani Сељани
- Village
- Location within Bosnia and Herzegovina
- Country: Bosnia and Herzegovina
- Entity: Federation of Bosnia and Herzegovina
- Canton: Herzegovina-Neretva
- Municipality: Konjic

Area
  - Total: 0.98 sq mi (2.55 km^{2})

Population (2013)
  - Total: 142
  - Density: 144/sq mi (55.7/km^{2})
- Time zone: UTC+1 (CET)
  - Summer (DST): UTC+2 (CEST)

Seljani (Cyrillic: Сељани) is a village in the municipality of Konjic, Bosnia and Herzegovina.

== Demographics ==
According to the 2013 census, its population was 142.

Ethnicity in 2013
Ethnicity	Number	Percentage
Bosniaks	135	95.1%
Croats	1	0.7%
Serbs	1	0.7%
other/undeclared	5	3.5%
Total	142	100%
