= Bastasi =

Bastasi may refer to:

- Bastasi, Banja Luka, Bosnia and Herzegovina
- Bastasi, Bosansko Grahovo, Bosnia and Herzegovina
- Bastasi, Drvar, Bosnia and Herzegovina
- Bastasi, Foča, Bosnia and Herzegovina
