= Zubovići =

Zubovići may refer to:

- Zubovići, Foča, village in Bosnia and Herzegovina
- Zubovići, Goražde, village Bosnia and Herzegovina
- Zubovići u Oglečevi, village near Goražde, Bosnia and Herzegovina
- Zubovići, Dobretići, village in Bosnia and Herzegovina
- Zubovići, Croatia, village near Novalja
