= Mehmed Pasha Kukavica =

Bosnian Ottoman statesperson

Mehmed-paša Kukavica (Foča - Resmo, Crete), was Ottoman governor of Bosnia.

== Biography ==
Originally from a local background, he was born in Foča into an Islamized family of Bosnian nobles, the Pavlovićs, who came from the village of Popov Most, about 30 km south of Foča. He is one of the prominent governors. He governed Ottoman Bosnia for a total of six and a half years. He first served in Bosnia. After serving in Bosnia, he went to Constantinople to the court, where he quickly advanced in the hierarchy. He quickly rose to the position of vizier or pasha with three tugas. He was first promoted to kapidjibaš at court. Between March 10 and April 7, 1750 (Rebiul-Ahar 1163), he became ser-čauš or čaušbaša (chief of court ceremonies). At the end of September 1752, Kukavica was transferred to Bosnia. As the sultan's special envoy (memur), he was tasked with restoring order. He governed for the first time from 1752 to 1756. In April 1753, he received the third tuga and thus the title of vizier. He was the Bosnian governor for the second time from 1757 to 1760. Between 13 August and 11 September 1760 (Muharram 1174), he left Bosnia, first as governor of Janina (Epirus). Then, during the Jumadel-Ahara (8 January - 5 February 1761), he was stripped of all his honors and exiled to Rethymno in Crete, where he was executed. While he was governor in Bosnia, according to Süreyya, he took Hekim-oglu Ali-pasha as his ćehaja. Kukavica's administration of the Bosnia Pashaluk was marked by numerous rebellions and riots. Kukavica personally engaged in the fight against the rebels, against whom he led several campaigns. He ruled from Travnik. His reign was generally marked by strong measures to strengthen state authority in the Bosnian Pashaluk.

Another facet of his administration was the establishment of numerous endowments. He built the buildings at his own expense. The pace of construction of new buildings was rapid. He is significant for Ottoman architecture due to the number and speed of construction of the buildings he had built, because they were built during the decline of Ottoman power. The buildings he built were for public purposes. He built more than 80 such buildings in eight places: in Foča, Goražde, Prijepolje, Sarajevo, Visoko, Travnik and in two villages near Travnik, Vitez and Slimena. He also took care of the sources of support for the buildings and officials (imam, vaiz, džabija, muezzin, mualim, sujoldžija, muderis, feraš, kajjim, devrihan) in the buildings for the future: caravanserai, hammams, shops, čiflukas, bezistans. The set of built endowment buildings consists of four mosques, one madrasa, four mektebs, five bridges, one sebilj, four other fountains, three caravanserai, one hamam, and one bezistan with several shops.

He left behind heirs, some of whom were also important in the public and administrative life of Bosnia at the time. The only direct descendant of Mehmed Pasha Kukavica today is Halida Hasić, born Ibrahimpašić. The surname Ibrahimpašić came from Mehmed Pasha's son Ibrahim-paša, born to a Montenegrin mother, Hajdana Buletić. Serfs and others called her ancestors Kukavičići. After Mehmed Pasha's son, the family took on the surname and continued to live as Ibrahimpašići, with Halida being the seventh generation.

== Sources ==
- Desanka Kovačević-Kojić, Gradska naselja srednjovjekovne bosanske države, Sarajevo, 1978.
- Husref Redžić, Studije o islamskoj arhitektonskoj baštini, biblioteka "Kulturno naslijeđe", Sarajevo, 1983.
- Grupa autora (akademik prof. Husref Redžić, docent mr Nedžad Kurto, Ferid Isanović), Program revitalizacije i regeneracije istorijskog područja grada Foče. Urbanističko-arhitektonsko rješenje zone Prijeke čaršije, Skupština opštine Foča, Foča, 1983. godine.
- Faruk Muftić, Foča: 1470-1996, Sarajevo, 1997.
- Mehmed Mujezinović, Islamska epigrafika Bosne i Hercegovine, knjiga 2, Istočna i centralna Bosna, 3. izdanje, Sarajevo, 1998.
