= Drače =

Drače may refer to:

- Drače, Bosnia and Herzegovina
- Drače, Croatia
