= Ljubina =

Ljubina (Serbian Cyrillic: Љубина) may refer to:

- Ljubina, Ilijaš, settlement in Bosnia and Herzegovina
- Ljubina, Foča, village in Bosnia and Herzegovina
- Ljubina – Poturovići, village in Bosnia and Herzegovina
- Ljubina, Dvor, village in Croatia.
- Čika Ljubina, street in Belgrade
- Ljubina (Bosna), right tributary of Bosna river, Bosnia and Herzegovina
- Ljubina (Jablanica), right tributary of Jablanica river, in Serbia
