= Biokovo (disambiguation) =

Biokovo is a mountain range in Croatia.

Biokovo may also refer to:

- Biokovo, Foča, village in Bosnia and Herzegovina
- Biokovo Nature Park
- MV Biokovo (built 2009), a ferry
