= Krnja Jela =

Krnja Jela may refer to:

- Krnja Jela, Bosanski Petrovac, a village in the municipality of Bosanski Petrovac, Bosnia and Herzegovina
- Krnja Jela, Šavnik, a village in the municipality of Šavnik, Montenegro
- Krnja Jela (Sjenica), a village in the municipality of Sjenica, Serbia

== See also ==
- Krna Jela, a village in the municipality of Foča, Bosnia and Herzegovina
