= Foča =

Town in Bosnia and Herzegovina

Foča Фоча
- Town and municipality
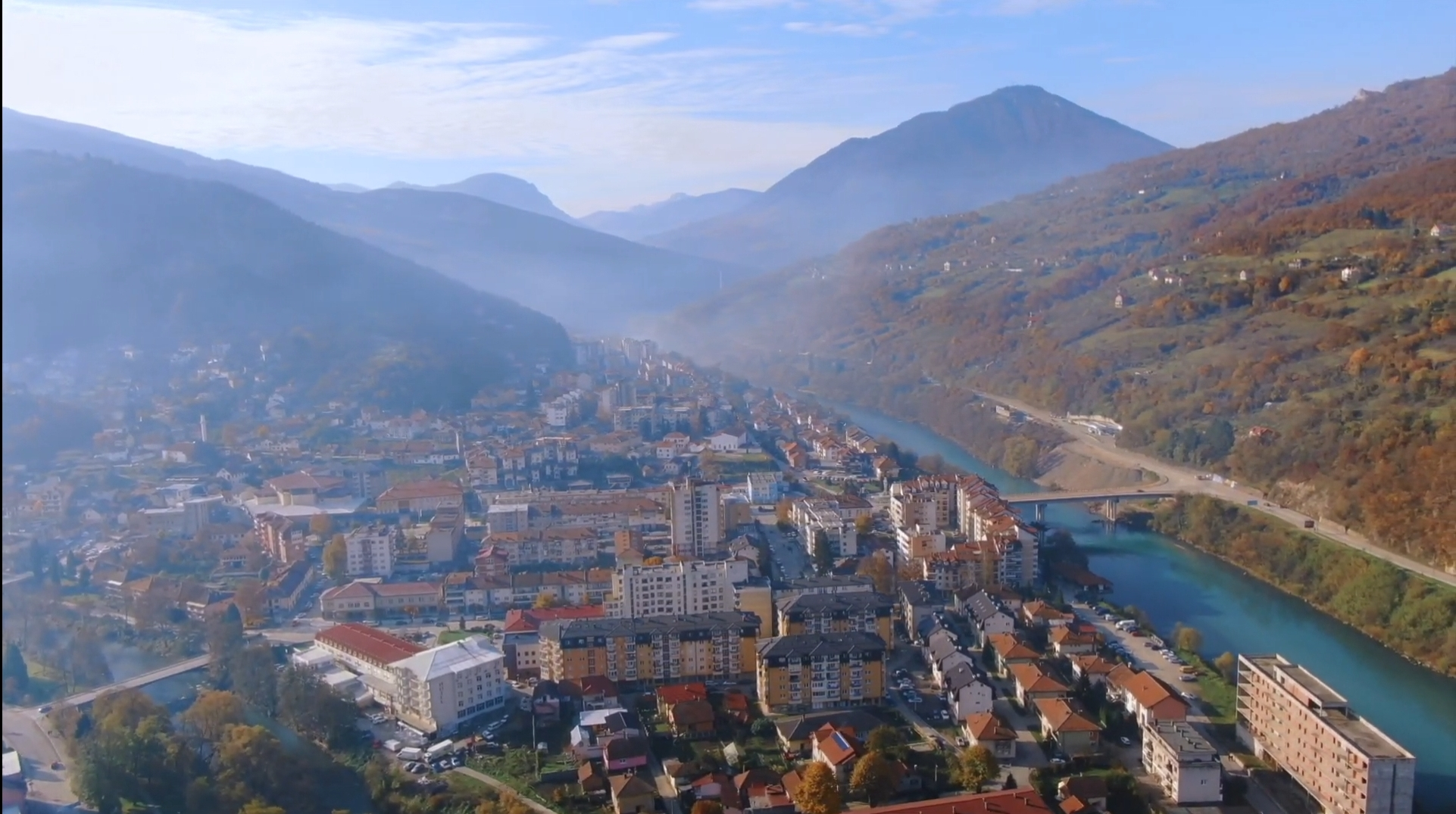
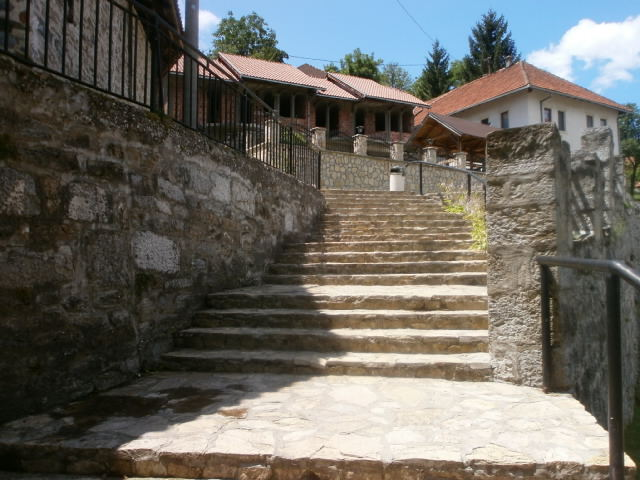
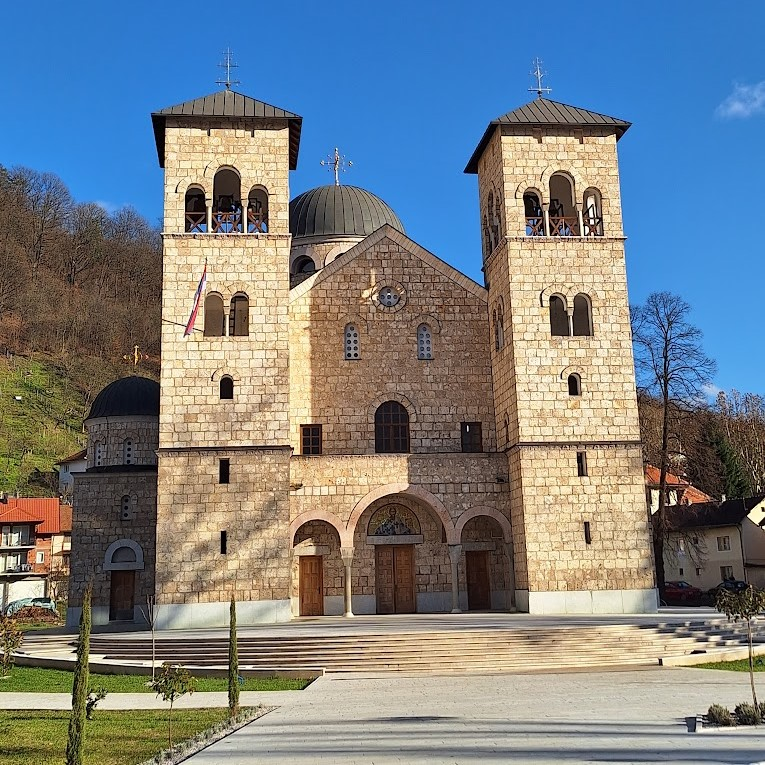
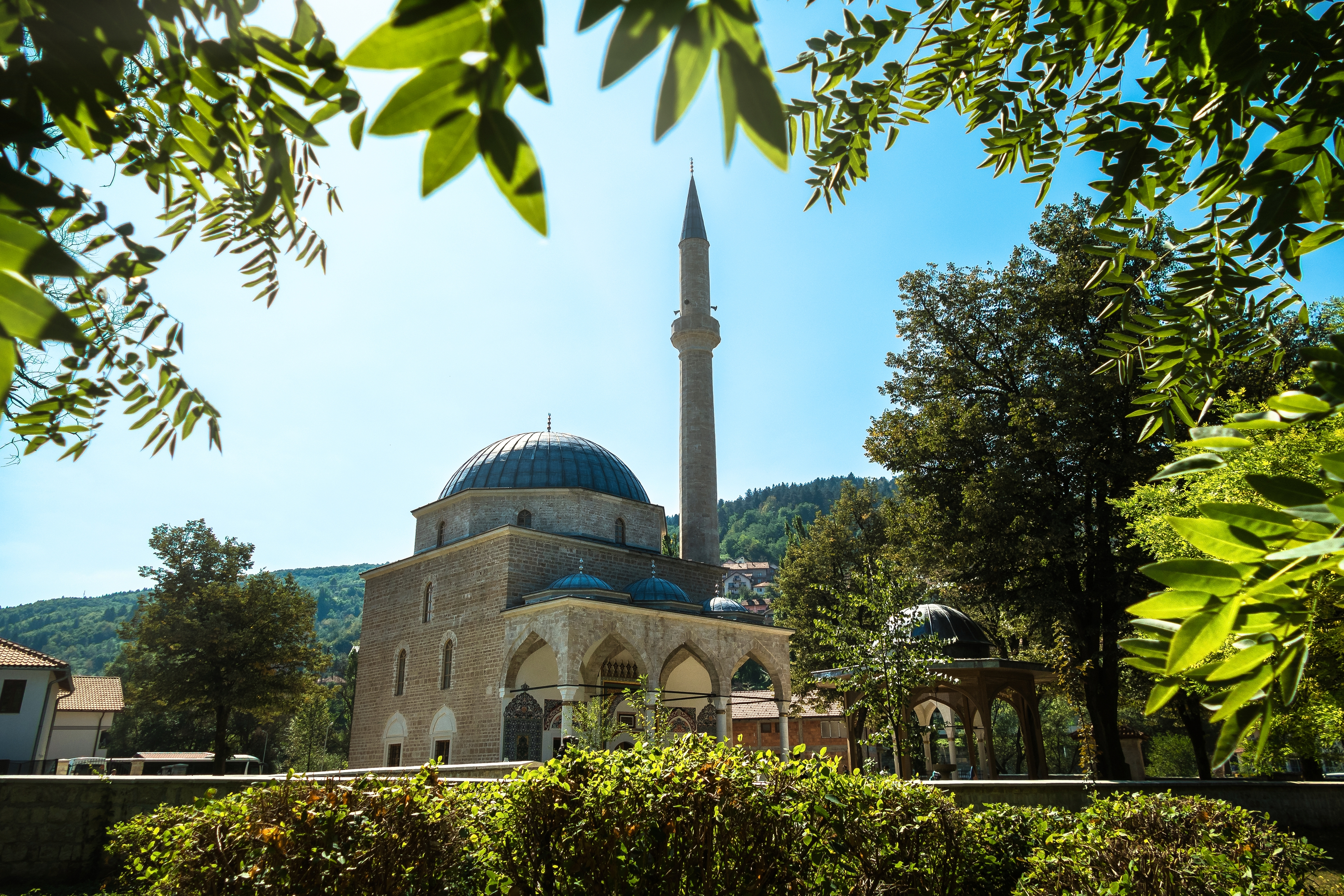
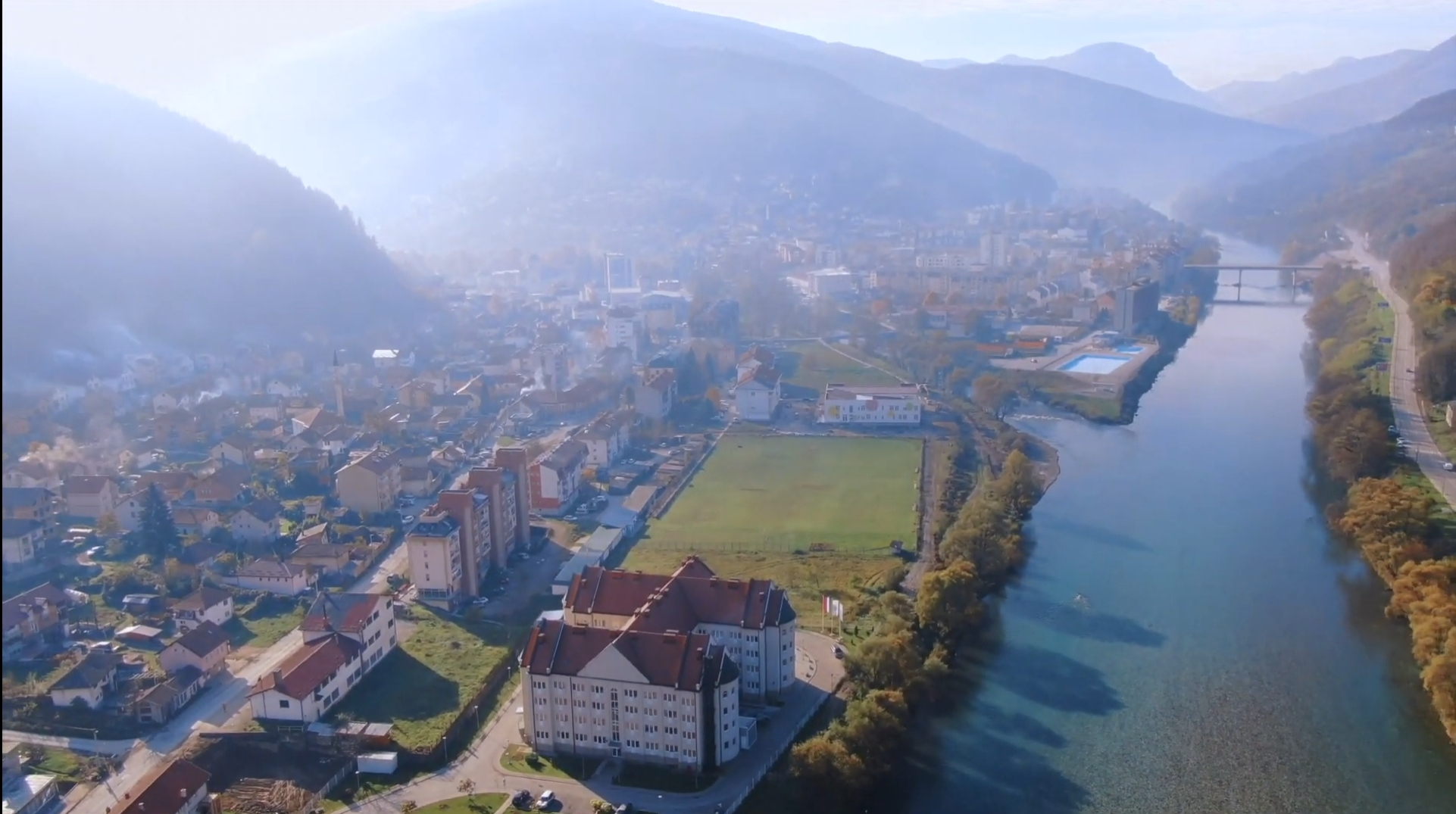

- Coat of arms

- Location of Foča within Bosnia and Herzegovina
- Coordinates: 43°30′23″N 18°46′29″E
- Country: Bosnia and Herzegovina
- Entity: Republika Srpska
- Geographical region: Podrinje

Government
  - Municipal mayor: Milan Vukadinović (SNSD)
  - Municipality: 1,134.58 km^{2} (438.06 sq mi)

Population (2013 census)
  - Town: 12,334
  - Municipality: 18,288
  - Municipality density: 16.119/km^{2} (41.747/sq mi)
- Time zone: UTC+1 (CET)
  - Summer (DST): UTC+2 (CEST)
- Area code: 58
- Website: www.opstinafoca.rs.ba

Foča (Serbian Cyrillic: Фоча, pronounced [fôtʃa]) is a town and municipality in Republika Srpska, Bosnia and Herzegovina, located in the southeast on the banks of Drina river. As of 2013, the town has a population of 12,234 inhabitants, while the municipality has 18,288 inhabitants. Foča houses some faculties (including the Medical and Orthodox Theological Faculty of Saint Basil of Ostrog) from the Istočno Sarajevo University. It is also home to the "Seminary of Saint Peter of Sarajevo and Dabar-Bosna", one of seven seminaries in the Serbian Orthodox Church.

Foča was, before the ethnic cleansing in 1992-1994, home to one of Bosnia's most important Islamic high schools, the Madrasa of Mehmed Pasha Kukavica. The Sutjeska National Park, which is the oldest National Park in Bosnia and Herzegovina, is located in the municipality.

== History ==
=== Early history ===
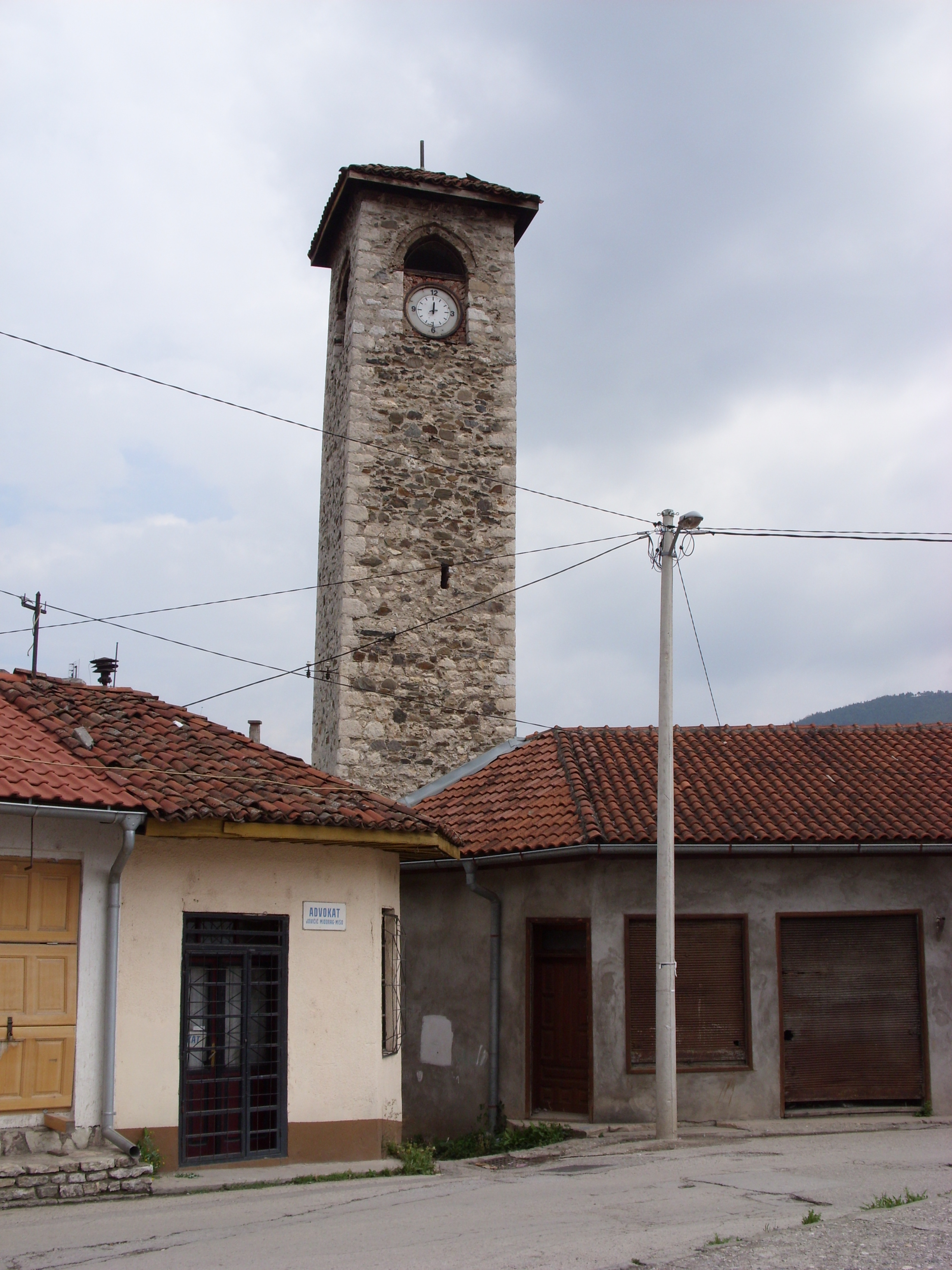
The old clock tower of Foča is a symbol of the town built in the 18th century

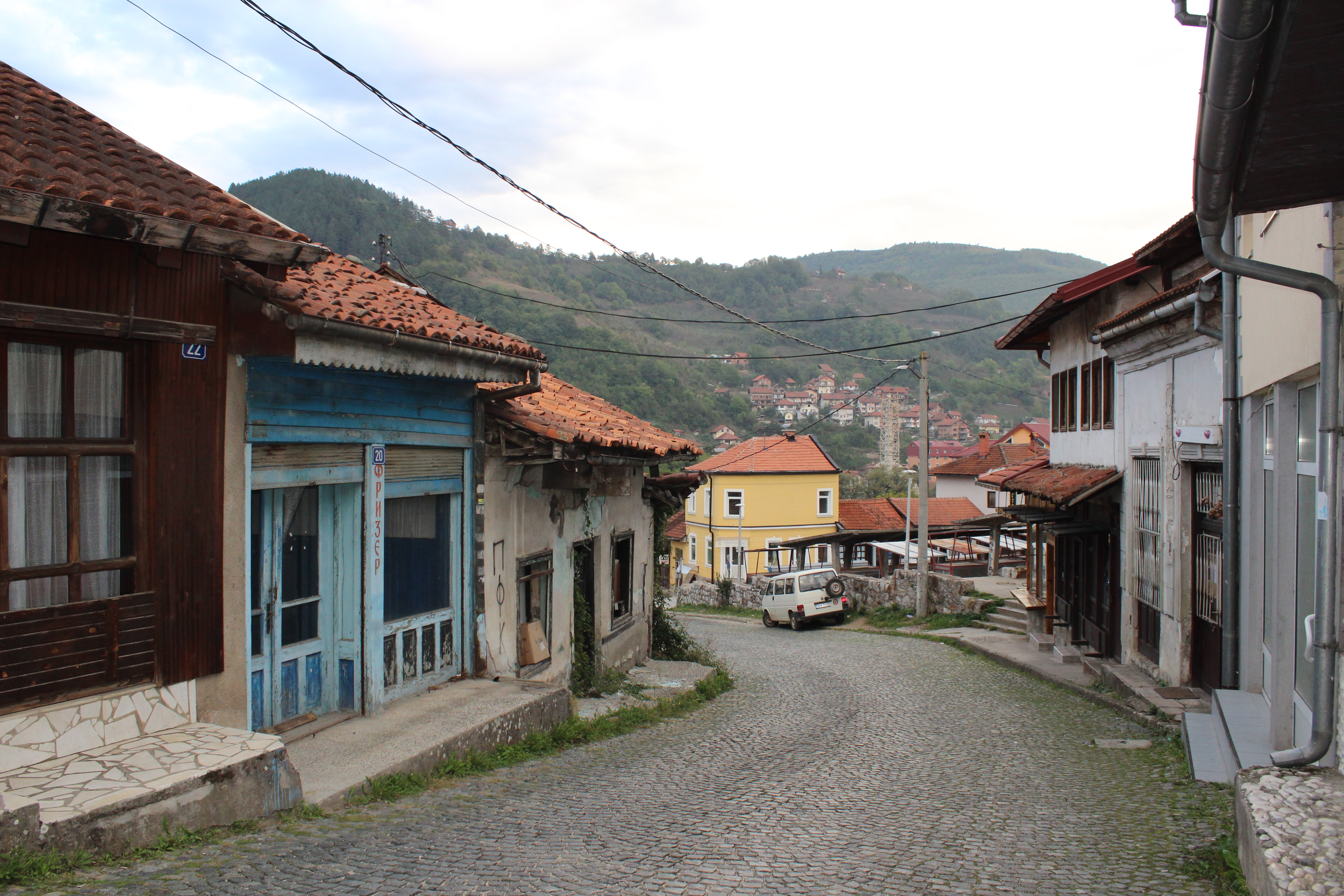
Old part of the town

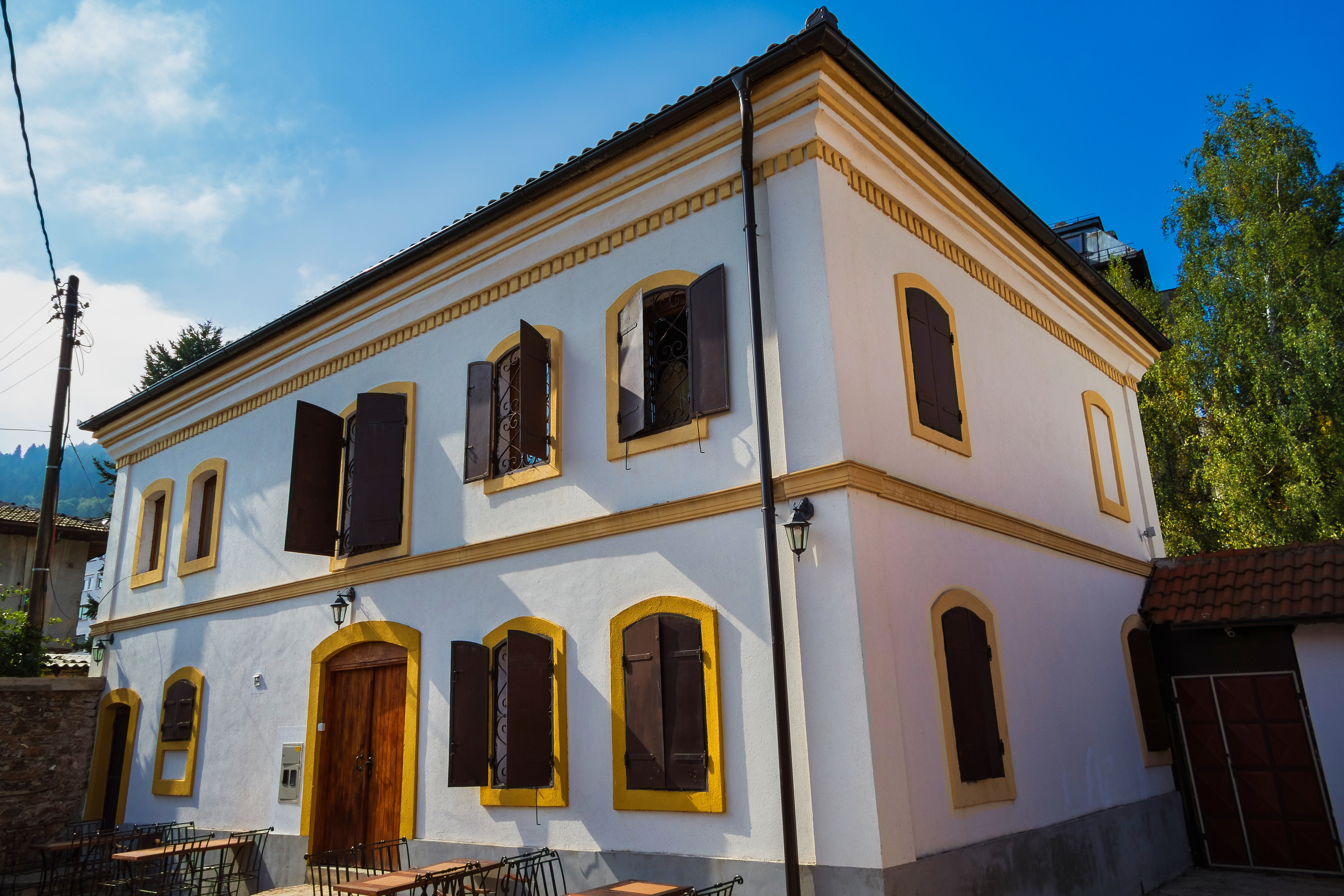
Hadživuković house, built in the 19th century

The first written traces of the name Foča date back to 1336. The town was known as Hotča or Hoča during medieval times. It was then known as a trading centre on route between Ragusa (now Dubrovnik) and Constantinople (now Istanbul, Turkey). Alongside the rest of Gornje Podrinje, Foča was part of the Serbian Empire until 1376, when it was attached to the Kingdom of Bosnia under King Tvrtko, king of Serbs, Bosnia, Coastal Lands and Zachlumia. After Tvrtko's death, the town was ruled by the dukes of Zachlumia, most notably was Herzog Šćepan. Foča was the seat of the Ottoman Sanjak of Herzegovina established in 1470, and served as such until 1572, when the seat was moved to Pljevlja.

=== World War II ===
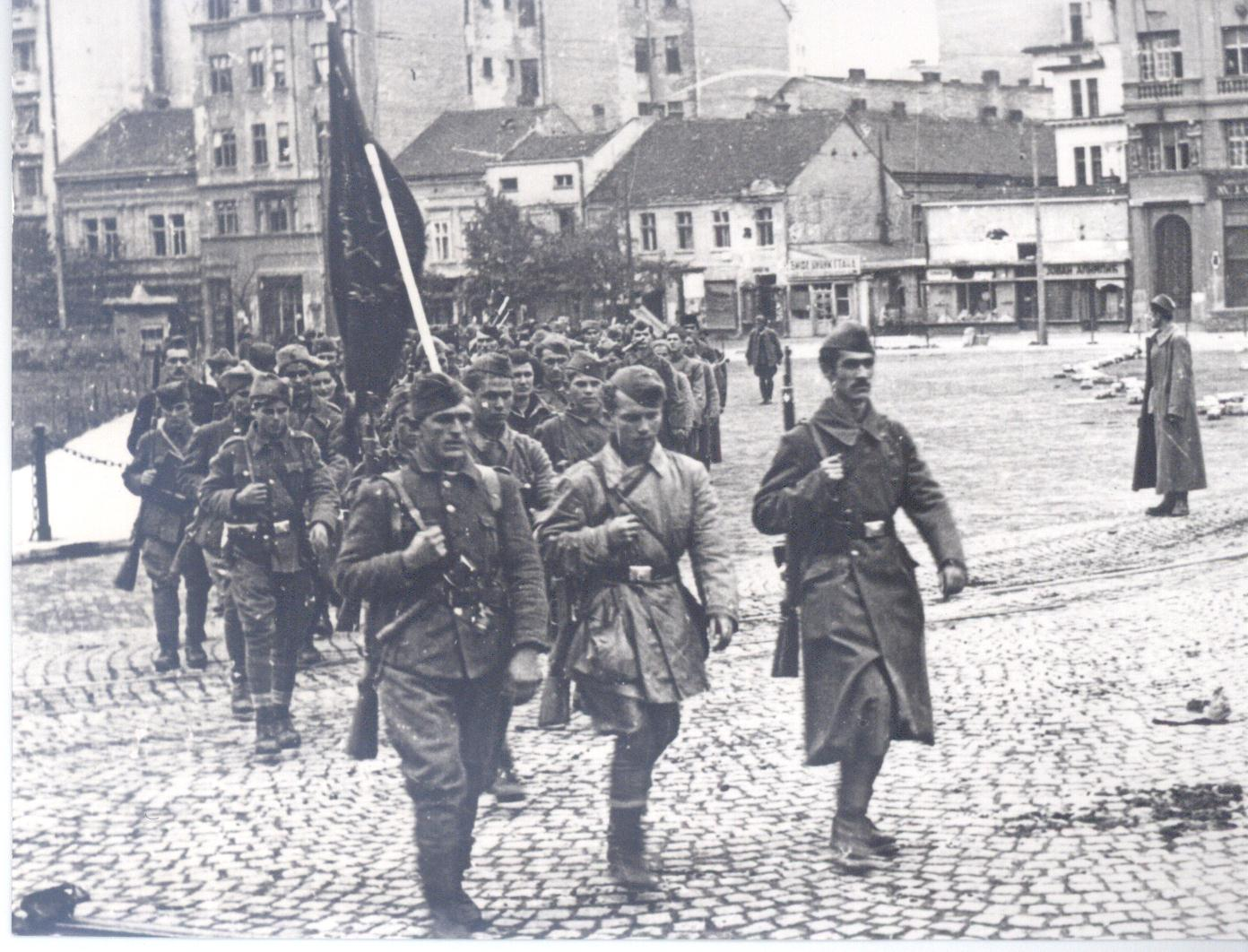
Young citizens from Foča entering Belgrade as a part of the Yugoslav Partisans

In 1941, the Ustaše killed the leading Serbs in Foča. Between December 1941 and January 1942 over two thousand Bosnian Muslim civilians were killed in Foča by the Chetniks as act of vengeance for repression over Serbs by Muslim soldiers in the ranks of the Ustaše.

When the German and Italian Zones of Influence were revised on 24 June 1942, Foča fell in Zone III, administered civilly by Croatia and militarily by Croatia and Germany.

Chetniks attacked Ustaše and in Foča in August 1942. Judita Alargić was commissar of the Central Hospital (sr) from 1942.

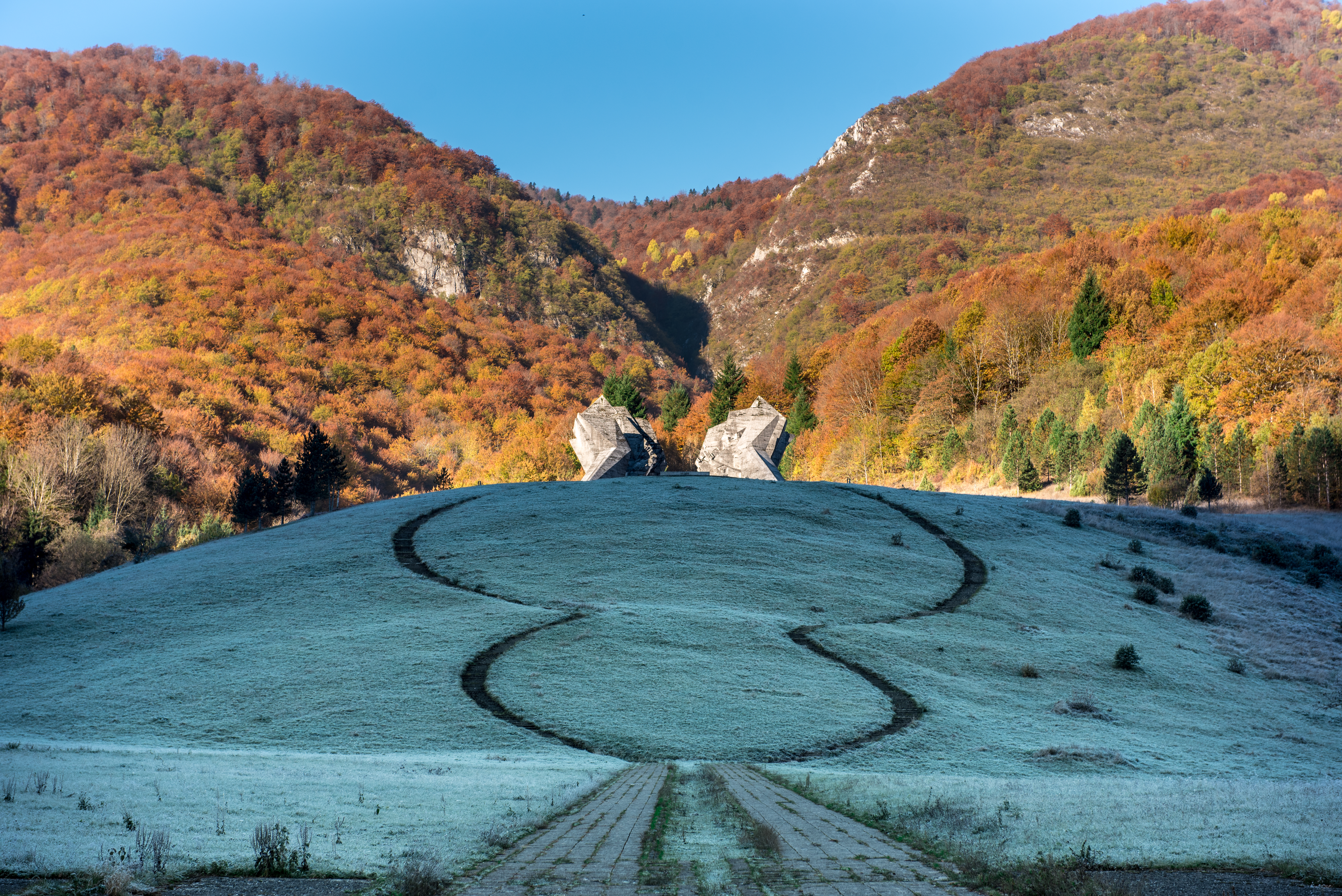
Tjentište, valley of heroes, dedicated to the fighters and victims from the WWII

On 13 February 1943, Pavle Đurišić reported to Draža Mihailović the actions undertaken by the Chetniks in the Foča, Pljevlja, and Čajniče districts: "All Muslim villages in the three mentioned districts were totally burned so that not a single home remained in one piece. All property was destroyed except cattle, corn, and senna."

In the operation Chetnik losses "were 22 dead, of which 2 through accidents, and 32 wounded. Among the Muslims, around 1,200 fighters and up to couple of thousands of civilian victims of both nationalitys." Đurišić said what remained of the Muslim population fled and that actions were taken to prevent their return. The municipality is also the site of the legendary Battle of Sutjeska between the Tito's Yugoslav Partisans and the German army. A monument to the Partisans killed in the battle was erected in the village of Tjentište.

=== Bosnian War ===
In 1992, at the onset of the Bosnian War, the city fell under the control of the Army of Republika Srpska. From 7 April 1992 to January 1994, Serb military, police and paramilitary forces enacted a campaign of ethnic cleansing in the area of Foča against Bosniak civilians. By one estimate, around 21,000 non-Serbs left Foča after July 1992. Most of them that managed to escape were settled in the town of Rožaje in Montenegro until the war ended. Only about 10 Bosnians remained at the end of the conflict. Thirteen mosques including the Aladža Mosque were destroyed and the 22,500 Bosniaks who made up the majority of inhabitants fled. The Tribunal Judges determined beyond a reasonable doubt that the purpose of the Serb campaign in Foča was, among others, "to cleanse the Foča area of Muslims" and concluded that "to that end the campaign was successful".

In numerous verdicts, the International Criminal Tribunal for the former Yugoslavia (ICTY) ruled that the ethnic cleansing, killings, mass rapes, and the deliberate destruction of Bosniak property and cultural sites constituted crimes against humanity. According to the Research and Documentation Center (IDC), 2,707 people were killed or went missing in the Foča municipality during the war. Among them were 1,513 Bosniak civilians and 155 Serb civilians. Additionally, Bosnian Serb authorities set up rape camps in which hundreds of women were raped. Numerous Serb officers, soldiers and other participants in the Foča massacres were accused and convicted of war crimes by the ICTY.

=== Post-war period ===
In 1995 the Dayton Agreement created a territorial corridor linking the once-besieged city of Goražde to the Federation entity; as a consequence, the northern part of Foča was separated to create the municipality of Foča-Ustikolina. Prior to that in 1994, the ethnically-cleansed town was renamed Srbinje (Serbian Cyrillic: Србиње), "place of the Serbs". In 2004, the Constitutional Court of Bosnia and Herzegovina declared the name change unconstitutional, and reverted it back to Foča.

Since the war, around 4,000 Bosniaks have returned to their homes in Foča, and several mosques have been re-built. This has taken place largely due to the administration of Zdravko Krsmanović, who was mayor from 2004 to 2012. In the 2012 elections, however, Krsmanović was defeated and a new mayor, Radisav Mašić, was elected with support of parties SDS and SNSD.

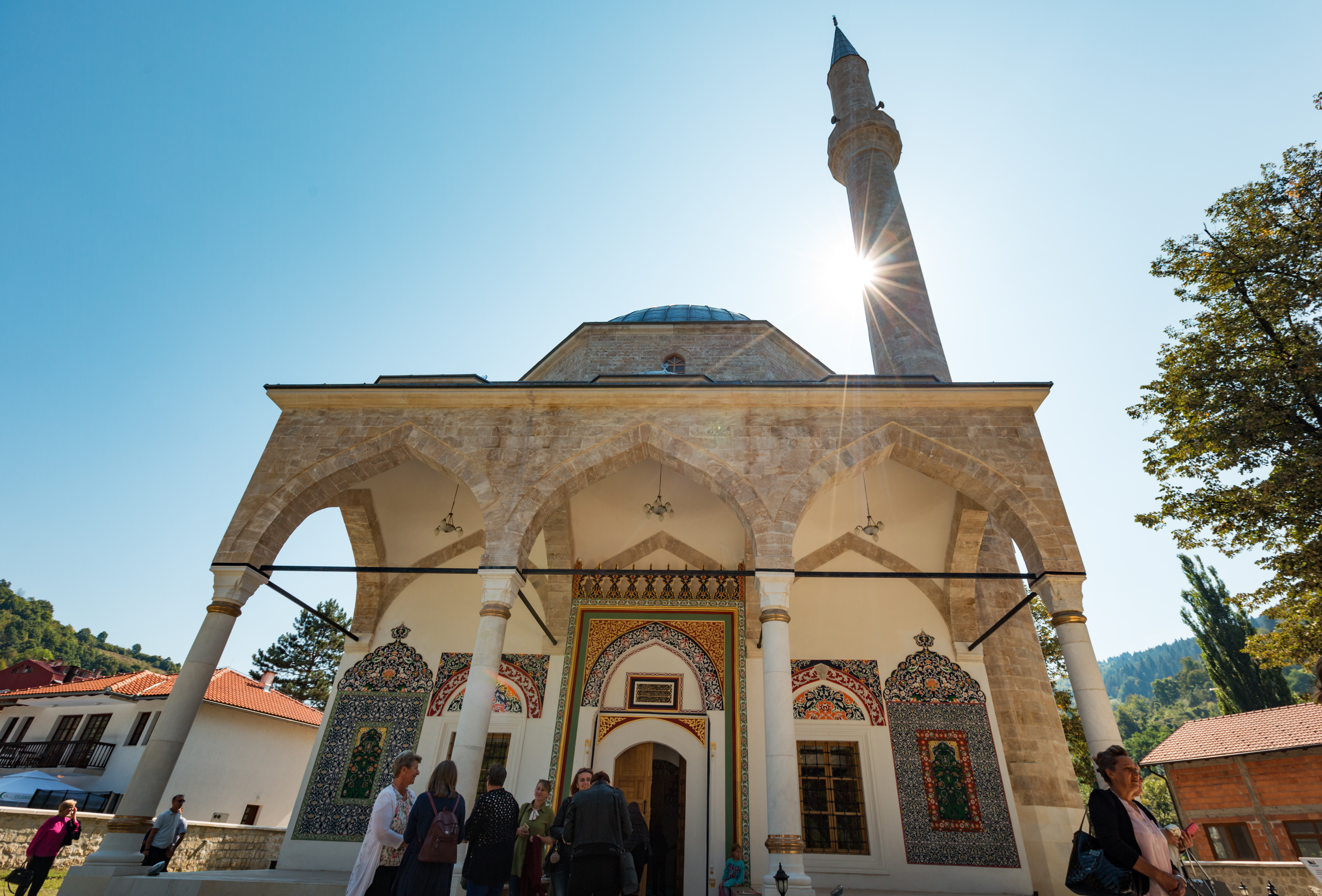
Reconstructed Aladža mosque; all mosques in the town were damaged or destroyed during the war

The Aladža Mosque was rebuilt from 2014 and reopened in May 2019.

In October 2004, members of the Association of Women Victims of War (Udruzenje Žene-Žrtve Rata) attempted to lay a plaque in front of the Partizan sports hall (also used in 1992 as a rape camp) to commemorate the crimes that occurred there. Around 300 Bosnian Serbs, including members of the Association of the Prisoners of War of Republika Srpska, prevented the plaque from being affixed.

The Partizan sport hall was reconstructed by UNDP, with EU funding, following a selection by the Foča municipal council, also with the participation of elected representatives of local returnees.

In 2018 and 2019, the association of war victims have been commemorating rape as a weapon of war by congregating in front of Karaman's House in Miljevina and of the Partizan sport hall in Foča on the International Day for the Elimination of Sexual Violence in Conflict (19 June).

== Settlements ==
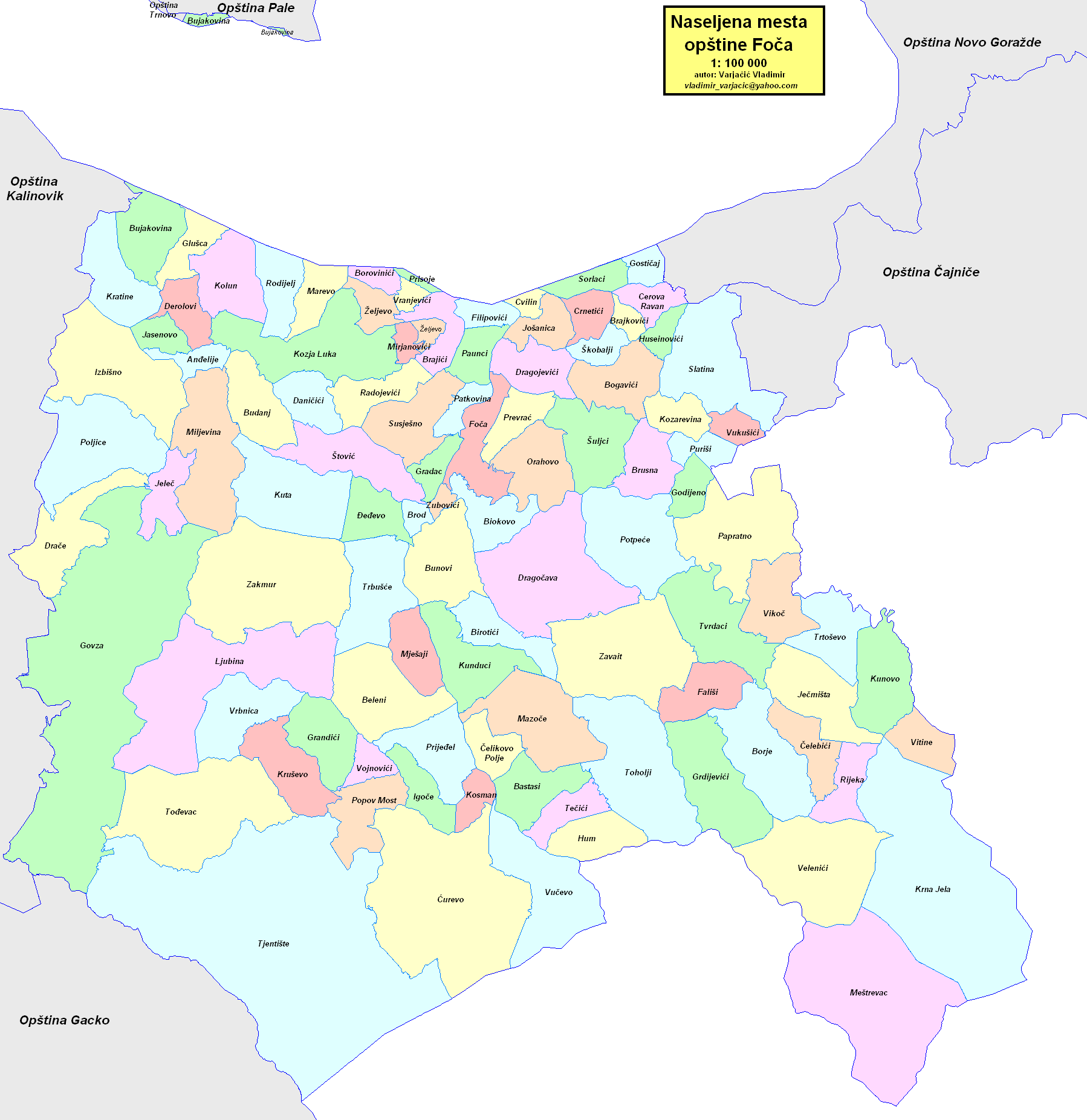
Settlements within Foča

After the Bosnian War the Northern area of the Foča Municipality was separated and incorporated into the Foča-Ustikolina Municipality, located in the Federation of Bosnia and Herzegovina. The majority of its population are Bosniaks.

Aside from the town of Foča, the municipality includes the following settlements:

- Anđelije
- Bastasi
- Bavčići
- Beleni
- Bešlići
- Biokovo
- Birotići
- Bogavići
- Borje
- Borovinići
- Brajići
- Brajkovići, Foča
- Brod
- Brusna
- Budanj
- Bujakovina
- Bunčići
- Bunovi
- Cerova Ravan
- Crnetići
- Cvilin
- Čelebići
- Čelikovo Polje
- Ćurevo
- Daničići
- Derolovi
- Donje Žešće
- Drače
- Dragočava
- Dragojevići
- Đeđevo
- Fališi
- Filipovići
- Glušca
- Godijeno
- Gostičaj
- Govza
- Gradac
- Grandići
- Grdijevići
- Hum
- Huseinovići
- Igoče
- Izbišno
- Jasenovo
- Ječmišta
- Jeleč
- Jošanica
- Kolakovići
- Kolun
- Kosman
- Kozarevina
- Kozja Luka
- Kratine
- Krna Jela
- Kruševo
- Kunduci
- Kunovo
- Kuta
- Lokve
- Ljubina
- Marevo
- Mazlina
- Mazoče
- Meštrevac
- Miljevina
- Mirjanovići
- Mješaji
- Mravljača
- Njuhe
- Orahovo
- Papratno
- Patkovina
- Paunci
- Petojevići
- Podgrađe
- Poljice
- Popov Most
- Potpeće
- Previla
- Prevrać
- Prijeđel
- Prisoje
- Puriši
- Račići
- Radojevići
- Rijeka
- Rodijelj
- Slatina
- Slavičići
- Stojkovići
- Sorlaci
- Susješno
- Škobalji
- Štović
- Šuljci
- Tečići
- Tjentište
- Tođevac
- Toholji
- Trbušće
- Trtoševo
- Tvrdaci
- Ustikolina
- Velenići
- Vikoč
- Vitine
- Vojnovići
- Vranjevići
- Vrbnica
- Vučevo
- Vukušići
- Zabor
- Zakmur
- Zavait
- Zebina Šuma
- Zubovići
- Željevo

== Demographics ==
=== Population ===
Population of settlements – Foča municipality
	Settlement	1948.	1953.	1961.	1971.	1981.	1991.	2013.
	Total	39,171	39,178	47,173	48,741	44,661	35,389	18,288
1	Brod						600	371
2	Đeđevo						504	323
3	Foča			6,763	9,257	11,530	14,335	11,237
4	Miljevina						1,763	973
5	Orahovo						308	326
6	Patkovina						600	298
7	Prevrać						426	203
8	Štović						458	201
9	Trbušće						544	207

=== Ethnic composition ===
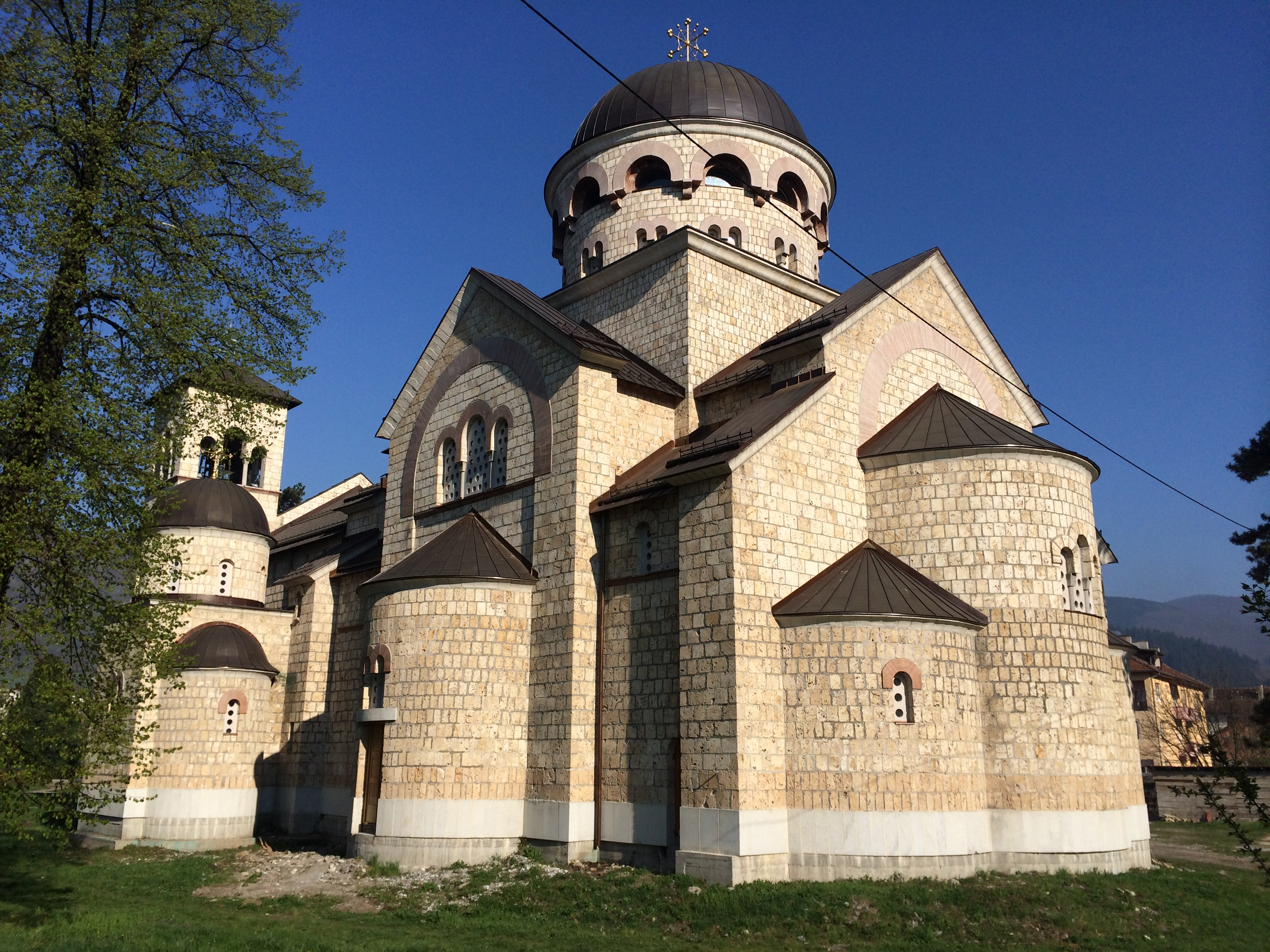
Serbian Orthodox church of St Sava

Ethnic composition – Foča town
	2013.	1991.	1981.	1971.
Total	11.237 (100,0%)	14,335 (100,0%)	11,530 (100,0%)	9,257 (100,0%)
Serbs	10.939 (97.3%)	7,901 (55,12%)	5,663 (49,12%)	4,148 (44,81%)
Bosniaks	83 (0.7%)	5,526 (38,55%)	4,414 (38,28%)	4,309 (46,55%)
Others	178 (1.6%)	522 (3,641%)	49 (0,425%)	77 (0,832%)
Yugoslavs		312 (2,176%)	677 (5,872%)	50 (0,540%)
Croats	37 (0.3%)	74 (0,516%)	87 (0,755%)	152 (1,642%)
Montenegrins			632 (5,481%)	514 (5,553%)
Albanians			8 (0,069%)	7 (0,076%)

Ethnic composition – Foča municipality
	2013.	1991.	1981.	1971.
Total	18,288 (100,0%)	35,389 (100,0%)	44,661 (100,0%)	48,741 (100,0%)
Serbs	16,739 (91,53%)	18,315 (45,21%)	18,908 (42,34%)	21,458 (44,02%)
Bosniaks	1,270 (6,944%)	20,790 (51,32%)	23,316 (52,21%)	25,766 (52,86%)
Others	224 (1,225%)	851 (2,101%)	148 (0,331%)	164 (0,336%)
Croats	55 (0,301%)	94 (0,232%)	141 (0,316%)	218 (0,447%)
Yugoslavs		463 (1,143%)	1,156 (2,588%)	102 (0,209%)
Montenegrins			947 (2,120%)	990 (2,031%)
Albanians			20 (0,045%)	13 (0,027%)
Slovenes			10 (0,022%)	15 (0,031%)
Roma			8 (0,018%)	
Macedonians			7 (0,016%)	15 (0,031%)

== Economy ==
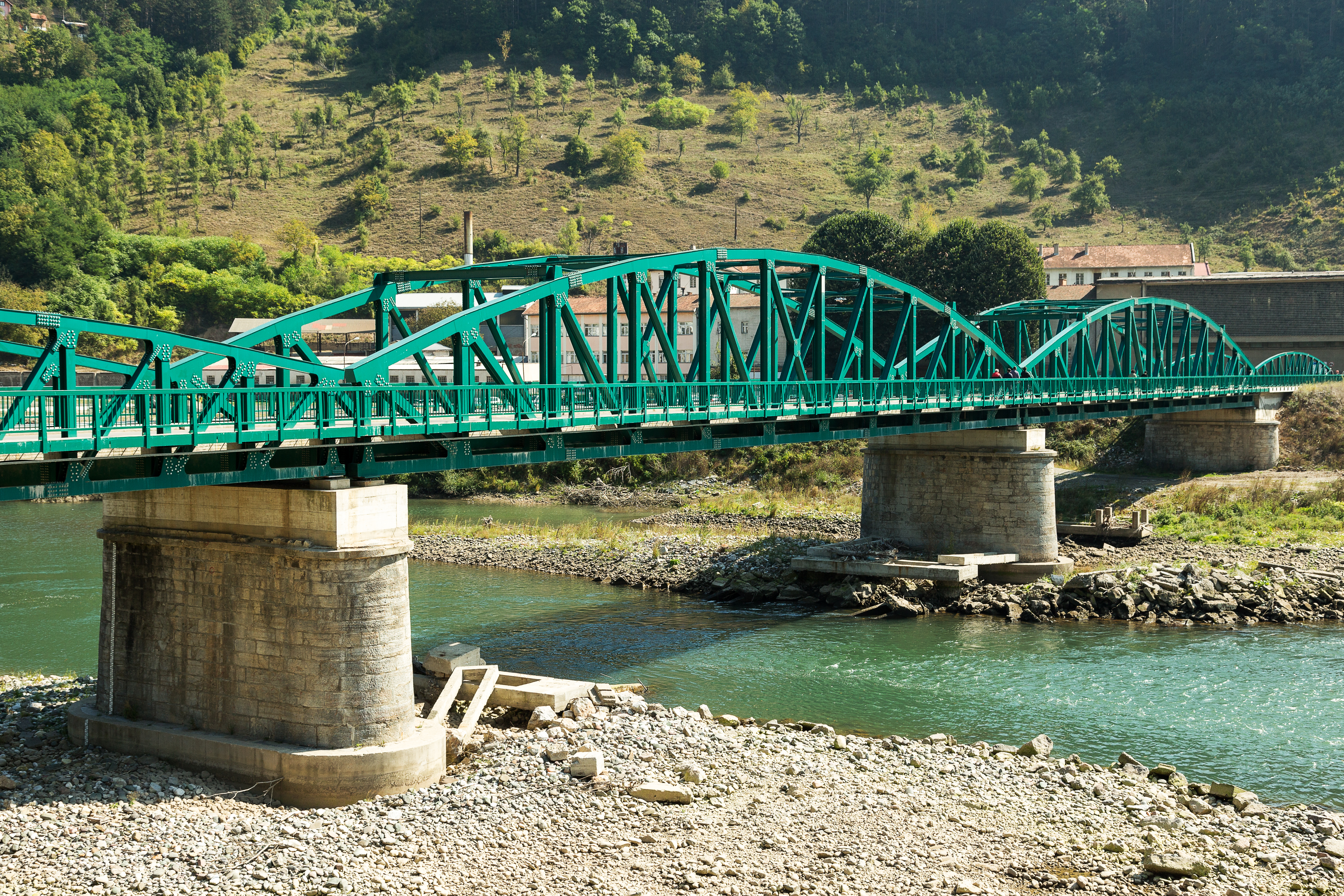
Prince Karl iron bridge, built in the late 19th century

The following table gives a preview of total number of registered people employed in legal entities per their core activity (as of 2018):

Activity	Total
Agriculture, forestry and fishing	280
Mining and quarrying	40
Manufacturing	188
Electricity, gas, steam and air conditioning supply	70
Water supply; sewerage, waste management and remediation activities	84
Construction	124
Wholesale and retail trade, repair of motor vehicles and motorcycles	375
Transportation and storage	158
Accommodation and food services	184
Information and communication	53
Financial and insurance activities	58
Real estate activities	-
Professional, scientific and technical activities	48
Administrative and support service activities	9
Public administration and defense; compulsory social security	647
Education	467
Human health and social work activities	619
Arts, entertainment and recreation	138
Other service activities	46
Total	3,588

== Culture ==
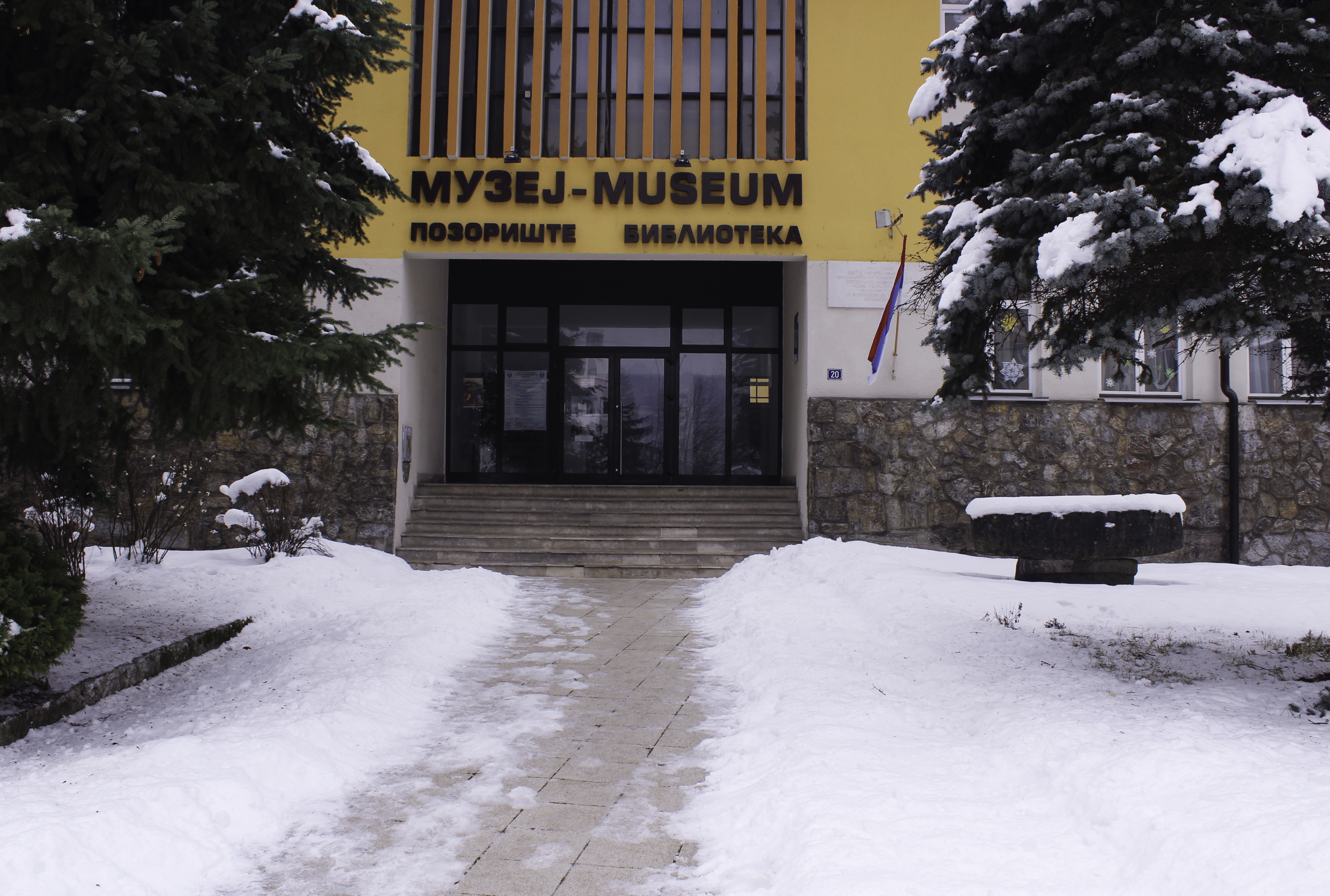
Museum of old Herzegovina

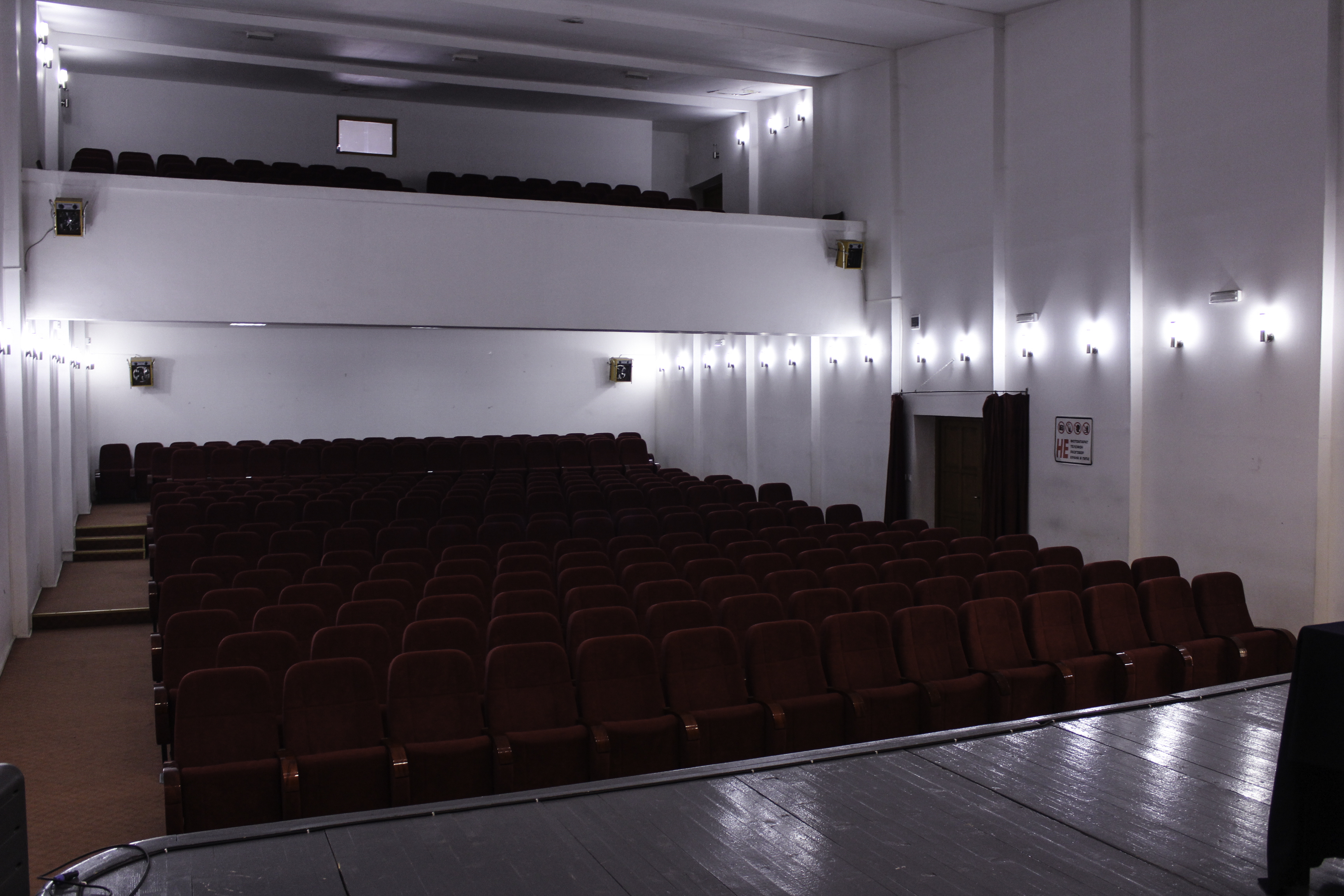
Local theatre

Museum of old Herzegovina and city theatre are located in Foča.

== Twin towns – sister cities ==
Foča is twinned with:

- (Serbia) Kragujevac
- (Montenegro) Nikšić
- (Montenegro) Herceg Novi
- (Greece) Larissa

== Notable people ==
- Risto Jeremić, doctor of medicine and first surgeon in Bosnia and Herzegovina
- Vojislav Maksimović, member of the first convocation of the Senate of the Republika Srpska
- Petko Čančar, former Minister of Justice of the Republika Srpska
- Maksim Vasiljević, Bishop of the Eparchy of Western America of the Serbian Orthodox Church
- Kukavica Mehmed Pasha, Bosnian Wali of Serbian origin
- Radmilo Mihajlović, former football player
- Rade Krunić, football player
- Enver Šadinlija, journalist, media host and author
- Božo Vrećo, Sevdalinka singer
- Aida Hadžialić, politician in Sweden
- Zehra Deović, Sevdalinka interpreter
- Adil Zulfikarpašić, Bosnian intellectual and founder of the Bosniak institute
- Sinan-paša Borovinić, Grand Vizier of the Ottoman Empire born in the village of Borovinići
- Mirzet Duran, Paralympic Medalist
