= Brusna =

- Village
- Location within Bosnia and Herzegovina
- Coordinates: 43°30′15″N 18°52′27″E
- Country: Bosnia and Herzegovina
- Entity: Republika Srpska
- Municipality: Foča
- Time zone: UTC+1 (CET)
  - Summer (DST): UTC+2 (CEST)

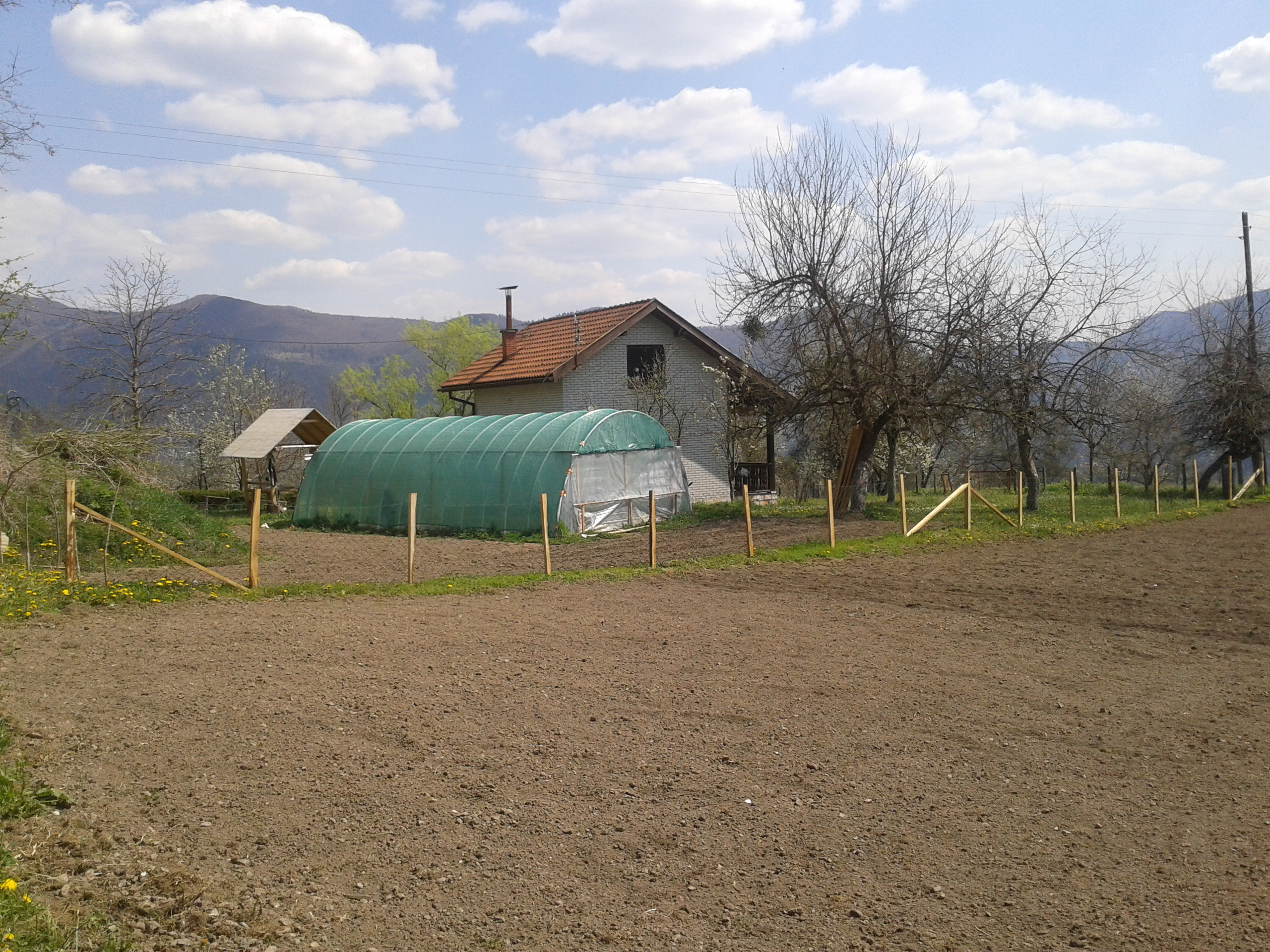
Brusna village, municipality of Foča, the Republika Srpska (2013)

Brusna (Serbian Cyrillic: Брусна) is a village in the municipality of Foča, Republika Srpska, Bosnia and Herzegovina.
