= Toholji =

- Village
- Location within Bosnia and Herzegovina
- Coordinates: 43°23′18″N 18°53′10″E
- Country: Bosnia and Herzegovina
- Time zone: UTC+1 (CET)
  - Summer (DST): UTC+2 (CEST)

Toholji (Serbian Cyrillic: Тохољи) is a village in the municipality of Foča, Republika Srpska, Bosnia and Herzegovina.
