= Vojnovići (Foča) =

Vojnovići Војновићи
- Village
- Location within Bosnia and Herzegovina
- Coordinates: 43°23′00″N 18°43′30″E
- Country: Bosnia and Herzegovina
- Entity: Republika Srpska
- Municipality: Foča
- Time zone: UTC+1 (CET)
  - Summer (DST): UTC+2 (CEST)

Vojnovići (Serbian Cyrillic: Војновићи; or Vojinovići, Serbian Cyrillic: Војиновићи) is a village in the municipality of Foča, Republika Srpska, Bosnia and Herzegovina.

== See also ==
- Church of the Dormition of the Theotokos, Vojnovići
