= Kunduci =

- Village
- Location within Bosnia and Herzegovina
- Coordinates: 43°37′N 18°44′E
- Country: Bosnia and Herzegovina
- Entity: Republika Srpska
- Municipality: Foča
- Time zone: UTC+1 (CET)
  - Summer (DST): UTC+2 (CEST)

Kunduci (Serbian Cyrillic: Кундуци) is a village in the municipality of Foča, Republika Srpska, Bosnia and Herzegovina.
