= Borovinići =

Borovinići Боровинићи
- Village
- Location within Bosnia and Herzegovina
- Coordinates: 43°34′42″N 18°44′27″E
- Country: Bosnia and Herzegovina
- Entity: Federation of Bosnia and Herzegovina
- Region Canton: East Sarajevo; Bosnian-Podrinje Goražde
- Municipality: Foča; Foča-Ustikolina

Area
  - Total: 1.00 sq mi (2.59 km^{2})

Population (2013)
  - Total: 4
  - Density: 4.0/sq mi (1.5/km^{2})
- Time zone: UTC+1 (CET)
  - Summer (DST): UTC+2 (CEST)

Borovinići (Serbian Cyrillic: Боровинићи) is a village in the municipalities of Foča, Republika Srpska and Foča-Ustikolina, Bosnia and Herzegovina.

== Demographics ==
According to the 2013 census, its population was four, all Bosniaks living in the Republika Srpska part, thus none living in the Foča-Ustikolina part.
