= Orahovo, Foča =

Orahovo Орахово
- Village
- Location within Bosnia and Herzegovina
- Coordinates: 43°29′43″N 18°48′55″E
- Country: Bosnia and Herzegovina
- Entity: Republika Srpska
- Municipality: Foča

Population (2013-10-01)
  - Total: 326
- Time zone: UTC+1 (CET)
  - Summer (DST): UTC+2 (CEST)

Orahovo (Serbian Cyrillic: Орахово) is a village in the municipality of Foča, Republika Srpska, Bosnia and Herzegovina.
