= Church of the Dormition of the Theotokos, Vojnovići =

Church in Bosnia and Herzegovina

Church of Dormition of the Theotokos
- Црква успења пресвете Богородице
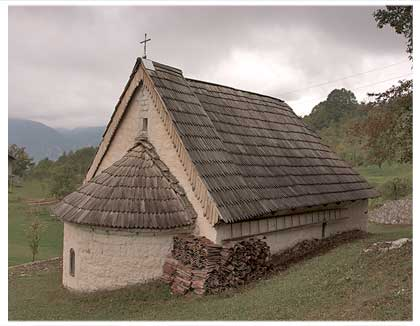
- Church of Dormition of the Theotokos
- Church of Dormition of the Theotokos
- Country: Bosnia and Herzegovina
- Denomination: Serbian Orthodox

History
- Dedication: Dormition of the Theotokos

Architecture
- Completed: 1834 or before

Administration
- Archdiocese: Metropolitanate of Dabar-Bosnia

The Church of Dormition of the Theotokos (Serbian: Црква успења пресвете Богородице) is a Serbian Orthodox church located in the village of Vojnovići in the Republika Srpska, Bosnia and Herzegovina. It is one of the oldest Orthodox churches in the region and traditionally served worshippers from several surrounding villages.

== History ==
According to local tradition, the church was built in the 18th century by Mehmed Pasha Kukavica in honor of his father, who was killed during the Ottoman Devshirme. According to that tradition, Mehmed's father was a priest in the village of Vojnovići when the Ottoman forces arrived, killed him, and took young Mehmed to Istanbul, where he was converted to Islam. Mehmed never forgot his origins and built the church upon returning to his native Herzegovina. Historical sources indicate certain overlap between the popular story and historical events identifying the existence of high level Bosnian vizier from the village who was executed in 1761.

In 2020 the building was reconstructed through voluntary contributions from locals Serbs Orthodox communities as well as donors, including from Bosniaks originating from the region. The church was re-consecrated by Metropolitan Hrizostom Jević of the Metropolitanate of Dabar-Bosnia.

== See also ==
- Eparchy of Zahumlje and Herzegovina
