= Štović =

- Village
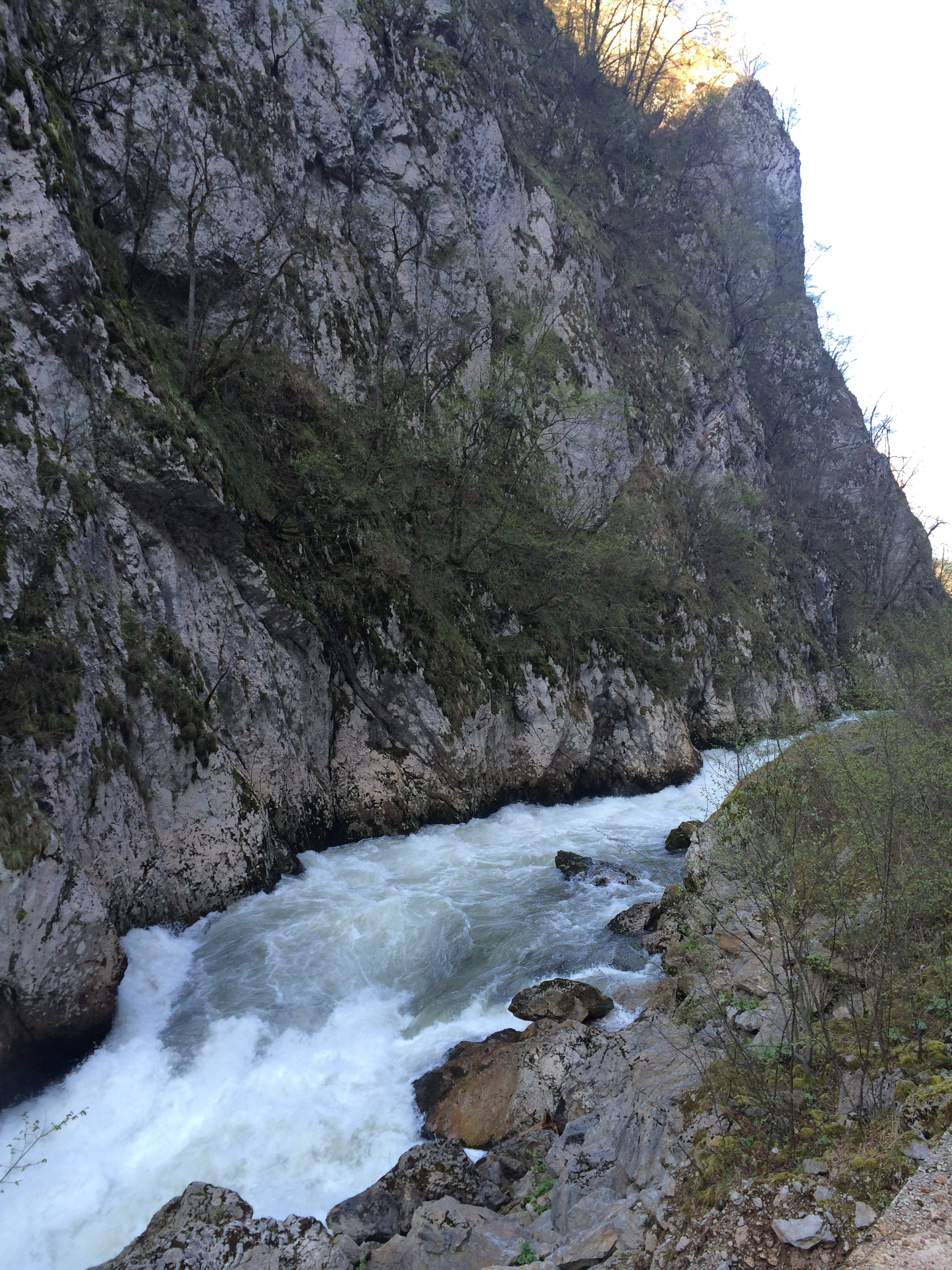
- Image from part of the village of Stovic in northwestern parts of the municipality of Foča, Republika Srpska, Bosnia-Hercegovina.

- Location within Bosnia and Herzegovina
- Coordinates: 43°30′34″N 18°43′10″E
- Country: Bosnia and Herzegovina
- Entity: Republika Srpska
- Municipality: Foča
- Time zone: UTC+1 (CET)
  - Summer (DST): UTC+2 (CEST)

Štović (Serbian Cyrillic: Штовић) is a village in the municipality of Foča, Republika Srpska, Bosnia and Herzegovina
