= Tvrdaci =

- Village
- Location within Bosnia and Herzegovina
- Coordinates: 43°26′06″N 18°55′47″E
- Country: Bosnia and Herzegovina
- Entity: Republika Srpska
- Municipality: Foča
- Time zone: UTC+1 (CET)
  - Summer (DST): UTC+2 (CEST)

Tvrdaci (Serbian Cyrillic: Тврдаци) is a village in the municipality of Foča, Republika Srpska, Bosnia and Herzegovina.
