= Fališi =

- Village
- Location within Bosnia and Herzegovina
- Coordinates: 43°25′N 18°54′E
- Country: Bosnia and Herzegovina
- Entity: Republika Srpska
- Municipality: Foča
- Time zone: UTC+1 (CET)
  - Summer (DST): UTC+2 (CEST)

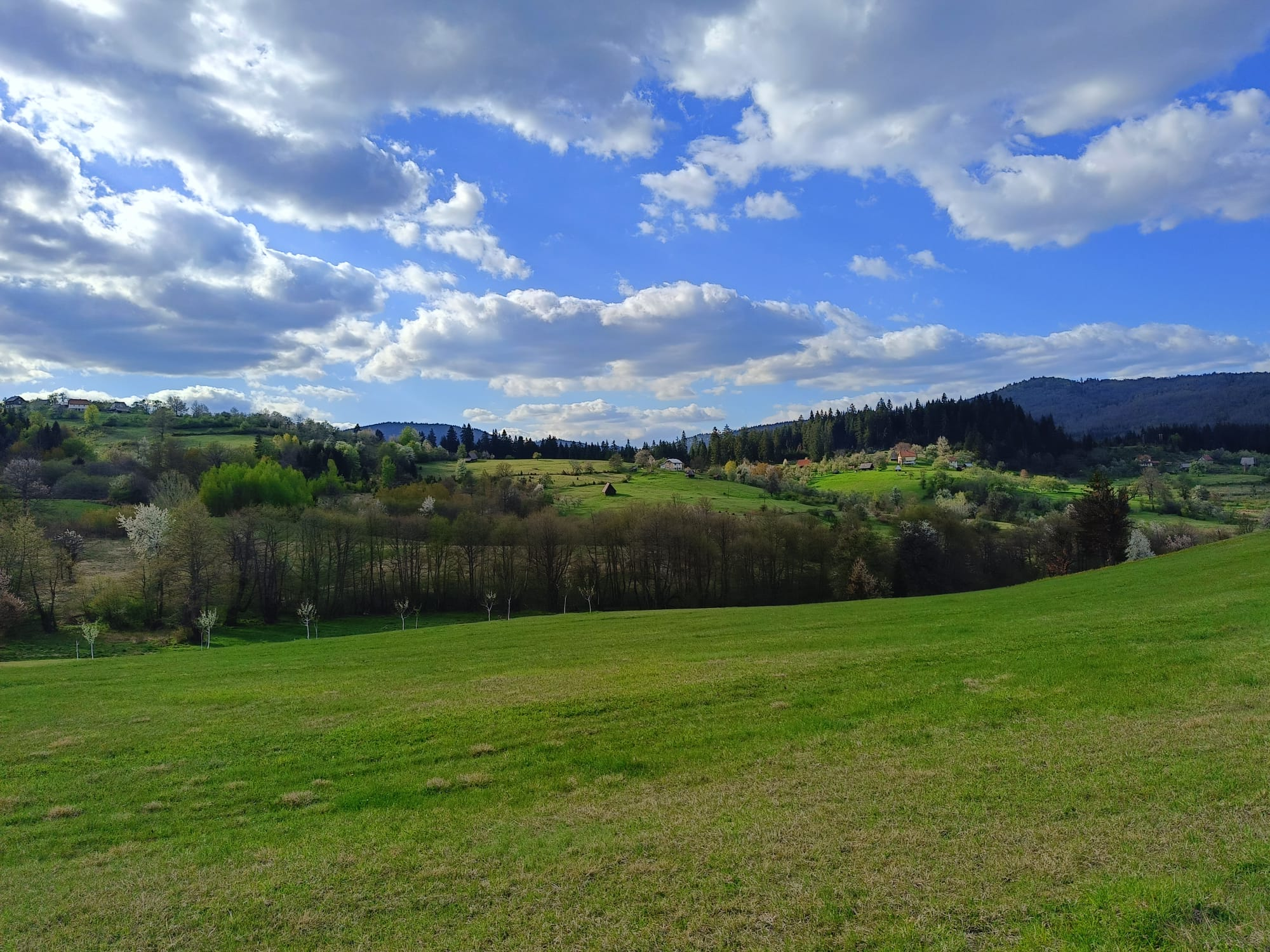
Panorama of the village Fališi

Fališi (Serbian Cyrillic: Фалиши) is a village in the municipality of Foča, Republika Srpska, Bosnia and Herzegovina. It is located close to the border.
