= Govza =

- Village
- Location within Bosnia and Herzegovina
- Coordinates: 43°28′35″N 18°36′34″E
- Country: Bosnia and Herzegovina
- Time zone: UTC+1 (CET)
  - Summer (DST): UTC+2 (CEST)

Govza is a village in Foča, Bosnia and Herzegovina.
