= Izbišno =

- Village
- Image from the village township of Izbišno, in the northern parts of the municipality of Foča - osnia & Hercegovina.

- Location within Bosnia and Herzegovina
- Coordinates: 43°31′58″N 18°36′19″E
- Country: Bosnia and Herzegovina
- Entity: Republika Srpska
- Municipality: Foča
- Time zone: UTC+1 (CET)
  - Summer (DST): UTC+2 (CEST)

Izbišno (Serbian Cyrillic: Избишно) is a village in the municipality of Foča, Republika Srpska, Bosnia and Herzegovina.
