= Tečići =

- Village
- Location within Bosnia and Herzegovina
- Coordinates: 43°21′57″N 18°49′20″E
- Country: Bosnia and Herzegovina
- Entity: Republika Srpska
- Municipality: Foča
- Time zone: UTC+1 (CET)
  - Summer (DST): UTC+2 (CEST)

Tečići (Serbian Cyrillic: Течићи) is a village in the municipality of Foča, Republika Srpska, Bosnia and Herzegovina
