= Zubovići, Dobretići =

Zubovići
- Village
- Location within Bosnia and Herzegovina
- Coordinates: 44.3683024°N 17.4177039°E
- Country: Bosnia and Herzegovina
- Entity: Federation of Bosnia and Herzegovina
- Canton: Central Bosnia
- Municipality: Dobretići

Area
  - Total: 1.63 sq mi (4.22 km^{2})

Population (2013)
  - Total: 259
  - Density: 159/sq mi (61.4/km^{2})
- Time zone: UTC+1 (CET)
  - Summer (DST): UTC+2 (CEST)

Zubovići is a village in the municipality of Dobretići, Central Bosnia Canton, Bosnia and Herzegovina.

== Demographics ==
According to the 2013 census, its population was 259, all Croats.
