= Stojkovići, Foča =

Stojkovići Стојковићи
- Village
- Location within Bosnia and Herzegovina
- Coordinates: 43.667375°N 18.672237°E
- Country: Bosnia and Herzegovina
- Entity: Federation of Bosnia and Herzegovina
- Canton: Bosnian-Podrinje Goražde
- Municipality: Foča-Ustikolina

Area
  - Total: 5.64 sq mi (14.60 km^{2})

Population (2013)
  - Total: 2
  - Density: 0.35/sq mi (0.14/km^{2})
- Time zone: UTC+1 (CET)
  - Summer (DST): UTC+2 (CEST)

Stojkovići (Serbian Cyrillic: Стојковићи) is a village in the municipality of Foča-Ustikolina, Bosnia and Herzegovina.

== Demographics ==
According to the 2013 census, its population was 2, both Bosniaks.
