= Krna Jela =

Krna Jela Крна Јела
- Village
- Location within Bosnia and Herzegovina
- Coordinates: 43°17′N 18°36′E
- Country: Bosnia and Herzegovina
- Entity: Republika Srpska
- Municipality: Foča
- Time zone: UTC+1 (CET)
  - Summer (DST): UTC+2 (CEST)

Krna Jela (Serbian Cyrillic: Крна Јела) is a village in the municipality of Foča, Republika Srpska, Bosnia and Herzegovina.
