= Biokovo, Foča =

Biokovo
- Village
- Location within Bosnia and Herzegovina
- Coordinates: 43°29′19″N 18°47′46″E
- Country: Bosnia and Herzegovina
- Entity: Republika Srpska
- Municipality: Foča
- Time zone: UTC+1 (CET)
  - Summer (DST): UTC+2 (CEST)

Biokovo (Serbian Cyrillic: Биоково) is a village in the municipality of Foča, Republika Srpska, Bosnia and Herzegovina.
