= Bastasi, Bosansko Grahovo =

Bastasi Бастаси
- Village
- Location within Bosnia and Herzegovina
- Coordinates: 44°04′14″N 16°39′23″E
- Country: Bosnia and Herzegovina
- Entity: Federation of Bosnia and Herzegovina
- Canton: Canton 10
- Municipality: Bosansko Grahovo

Area
  - Total: 33.37 km^{2} (12.88 sq mi)

Population (2013)
  - Total: 20
  - Density: 0.60/km^{2} (1.6/sq mi)
- Time zone: UTC+1 (CET)
  - Summer (DST): UTC+2 (CEST)

Bastasi (Serbian Cyrillic: Бастаси) is a village in the Municipality of Bosansko Grahovo in Canton 10 of the Federation of Bosnia and Herzegovina, an entity of Bosnia and Herzegovina.

== Demographics ==
According to the 2013 census, its population was 20, all Serbs.

== Bibliography ==
- Ethnicity/National Affiliation, Religion and Mother Tongue (PDF). Sarajevo: Agency for Statistics of Bosnia and Herzegovina. 2019.
