= Bastasi, Banja Luka =

Bastasi Бастаси (Serbian)
- Village (Selo)
- Location within Bosnia and Herzegovina
- Coordinates: 44°41′37″N 17°14′11″E
- Country: Bosnia and Herzegovina
- Entity: Republika Srpska
- Municipality: Banja Luka

Population (2013)
  - Total: 165
- Time zone: UTC+1 (CET)
  - Summer (DST): UTC+2 (CEST)

Bastasi (Serbian Cyrillic: Бастаси) is a village in the municipality of Banja Luka, Republika Srpska, Bosnia and Herzegovina.

== Demographics ==
Ethnic groups in the village include:

- 165 Serbs (90.30%)
- 12 Bosniaks (7.27%)
- 2 Croats (1.21%)
- 2 Others (1.21%)
