= Džankići =

- Village
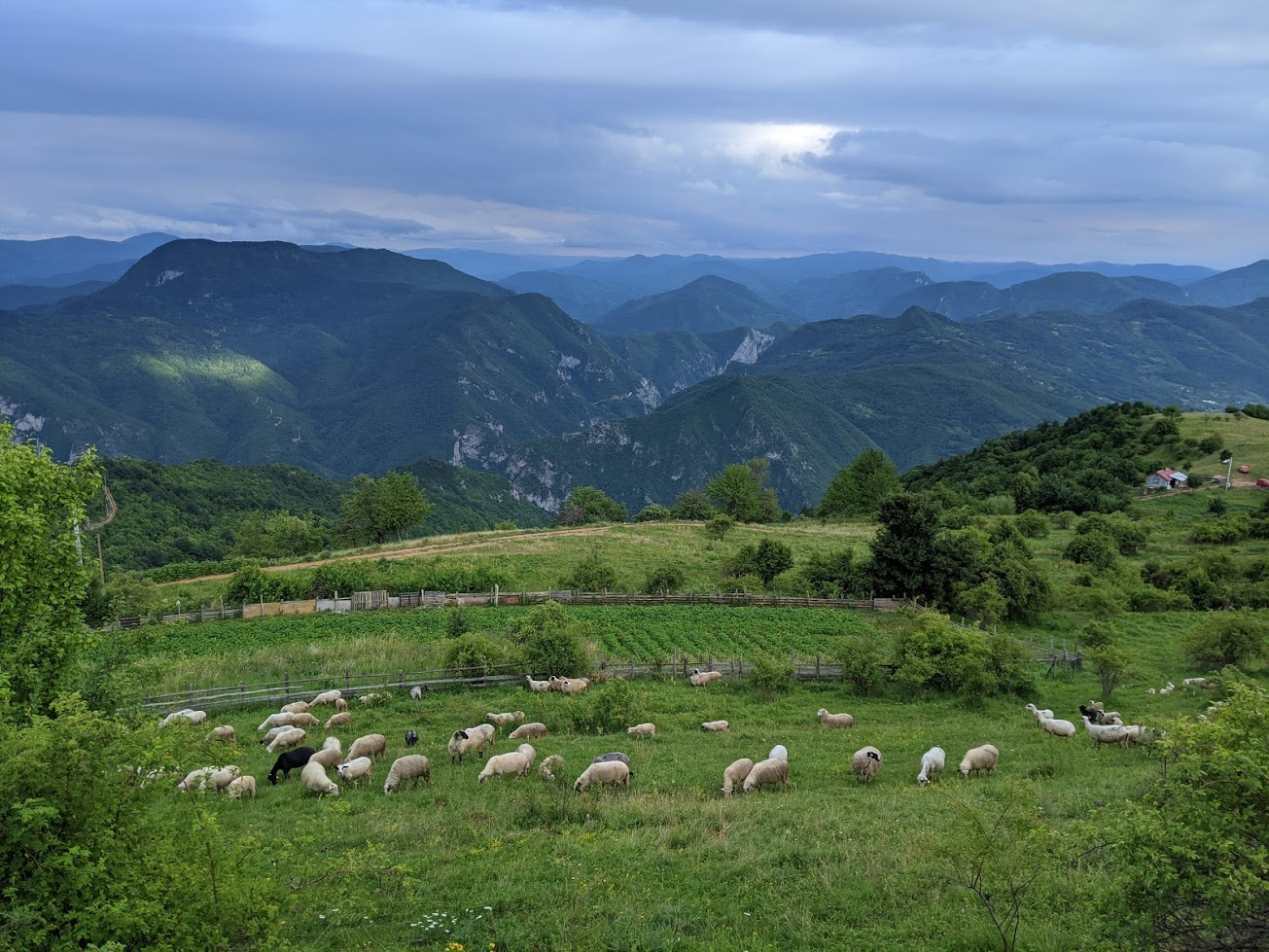
- View from Džankići

- Location within Bosnia and Herzegovina
- Coordinates: 43°45′20″N 19°10′55″E
- Country: Bosnia and Herzegovina
- Entity: Republika Srpska
- Municipality: Višegrad
- Time zone: UTC+1 (CET)
  - Summer (DST): UTC+2 (CEST)

Džankići (Serbian: Џанкићи) is a village in the municipality of Višegrad, Bosnia and Herzegovina.

== Lokacija i uprava ==
Džankići je selo u općini Višegrad, entitet Republika Srpska, Bosna i Hercegovina. Nalazi se na približno 43°45′20″ N, 19°10′55″ E, na nadmorskoj visini od oko 1 163 metara.

== Stanovništvo ==
Prema popisu iz 1991. godine selo je imalo 85 stanovnika, svi pripadnici muslimanske/bošnjačke nacionalnosti. Prema Popisu stanovništva 2013. godine zabilježen je 1 stanovnik, također Bošnjak.

== Geografija ==
Selo je smješteno u brdovitom području istočne Bosne, u blizini sela Međeđa (uz rijeku Drinu i magistralni put Sarajevo–Višegrad). Okruženo je sličnim zaselcima kao što su Gornja Brštanica, Đipi i Ban Polje. Teren je šumsko‑pašnjasti, karakterističan za planinska područja Višegrada.

== Bilješka ==
Većina lokalnih naselja biva pogođena proglašenjem hidroakumulacijskog jezera na Drini, što je utjecalo na demografiju i infrastrukturu.

== Geografske koordinate ==
- 43°45′20″ N 19°10′55″ E
- Nadmorska visina: 1 163 m
- Entitet: Republika Srpska
- Općina: Višegrad

== Stanovništvo kroz godine ==
- 1971: 230 stanovnika (čist etnički sastav)
- 1981: 165 stanovnika
- 1991: 85 stanovnika (100 % Bošnjaci)
- 2013: 1 stanovnik (100 % Bošnjak)
