= Hamandžići =

- Village
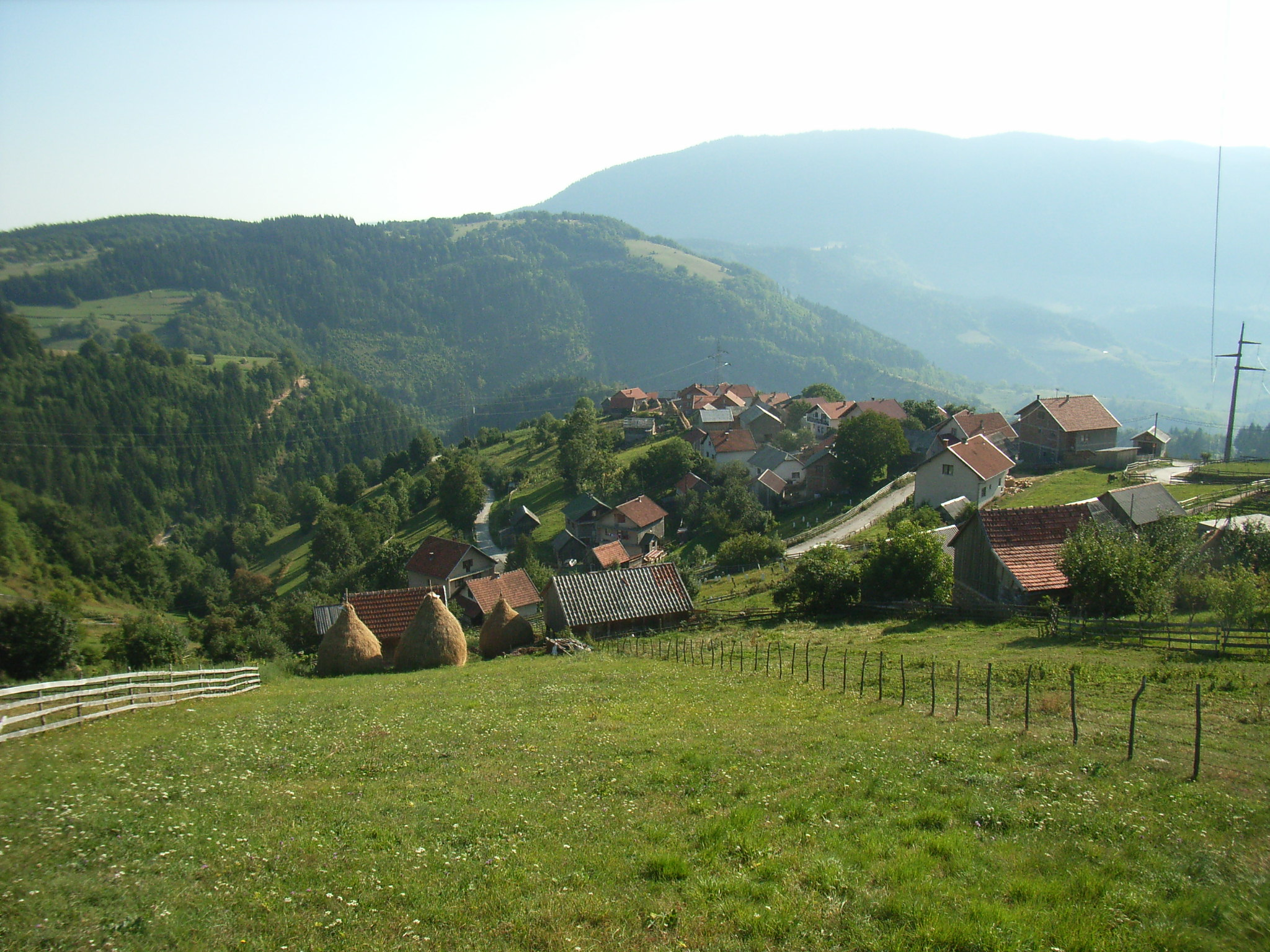

- Location within Bosnia and Herzegovina
- Coordinates: 44.2724833°N 17.4599776°E
- Country: Bosnia and Herzegovina
- Entity: Federation of Bosnia and Herzegovina
- Canton: Central Bosnia
- Municipality: Travnik

Area
  - Total: 6.94 sq mi (17.97 km^{2})

Population (2013)
  - Total: 256
  - Density: 36.9/sq mi (14.2/km^{2})
- Time zone: UTC+1 (CET)
  - Summer (DST): UTC+2 (CEST)

Hamandžići is a village in the municipality of Travnik, Bosnia and Herzegovina.

== Demographics ==
According to the 2013 census, its population was 256.

Ethnicity in 2013
| Ethnicity | Number | Percentage |
|---|---|---|
| Bosniaks | 242 | 94.5% |
| Croats | 1 | 0.4% |
| other/undeclared | 13 | 5.1% |
| Total | 256 | 100% |
