= Đelilovac =

- Village
- Location within Bosnia and Herzegovina
- Coordinates: 44.263259°N 17.5418421°E
- Country: Bosnia and Herzegovina
- Entity: Federation of Bosnia and Herzegovina
- Canton: Central Bosnia
- Municipality: Travnik

Area
  - Total: 4.14 sq mi (10.72 km^{2})

Population (2013)
  - Total: 777
  - Density: 188/sq mi (72.5/km^{2})
- Time zone: UTC+1 (CET)
  - Summer (DST): UTC+2 (CEST)

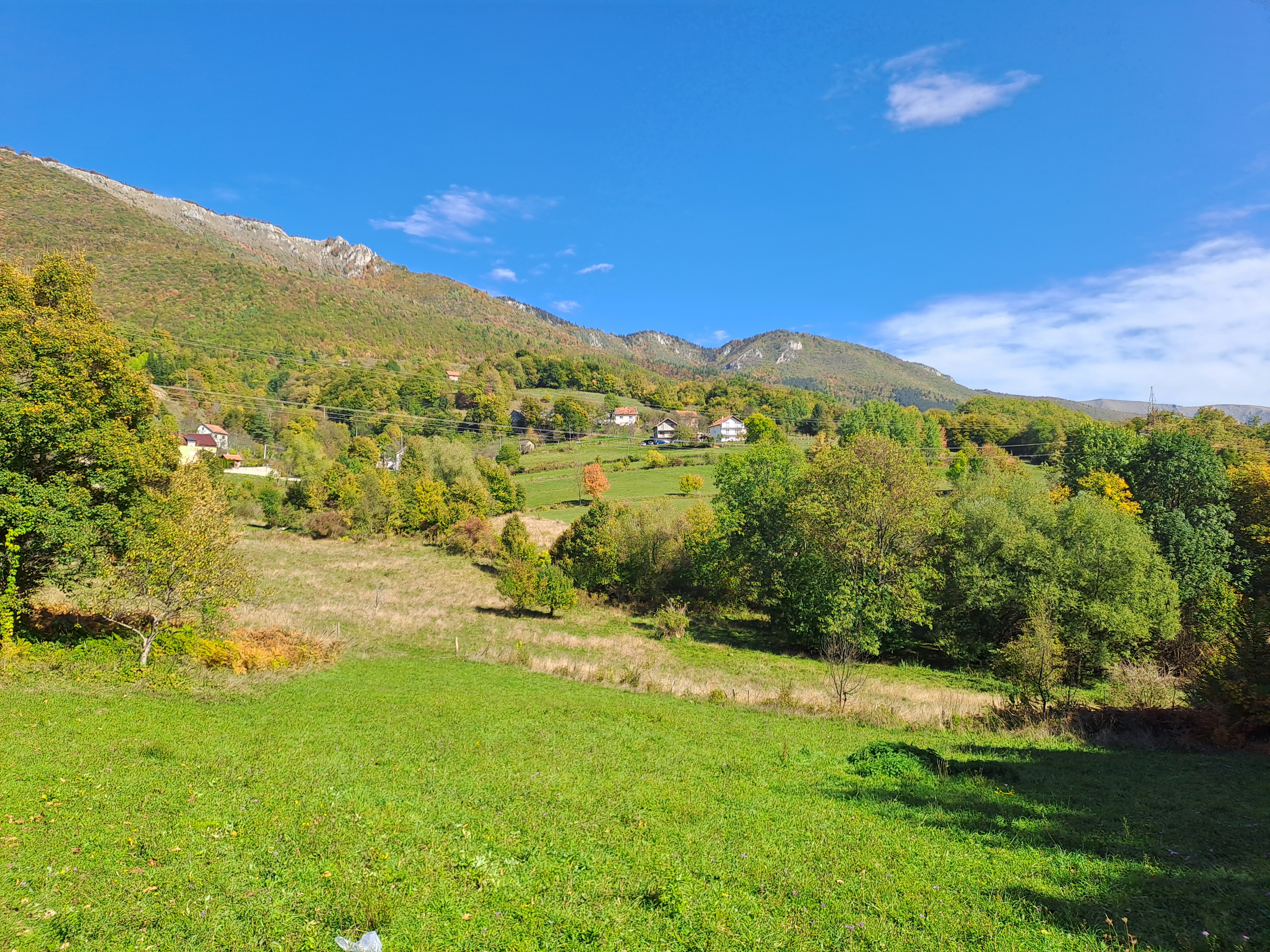
Ðelilovac in 2024

Đelilovac is a village in the municipality of Travnik, Bosnia and Herzegovina.

== Demographics ==
According to the 2013 census, its population was 777.

Ethnicity in 2013
Ethnicity	Number	Percentage
Croats	774	99.6%
Bosniaks	1	0.1%
Serbs	2	0.3%
Total	777	100%
