= Taleža =

Village in Bosnia

Taleža Талежа
- Village
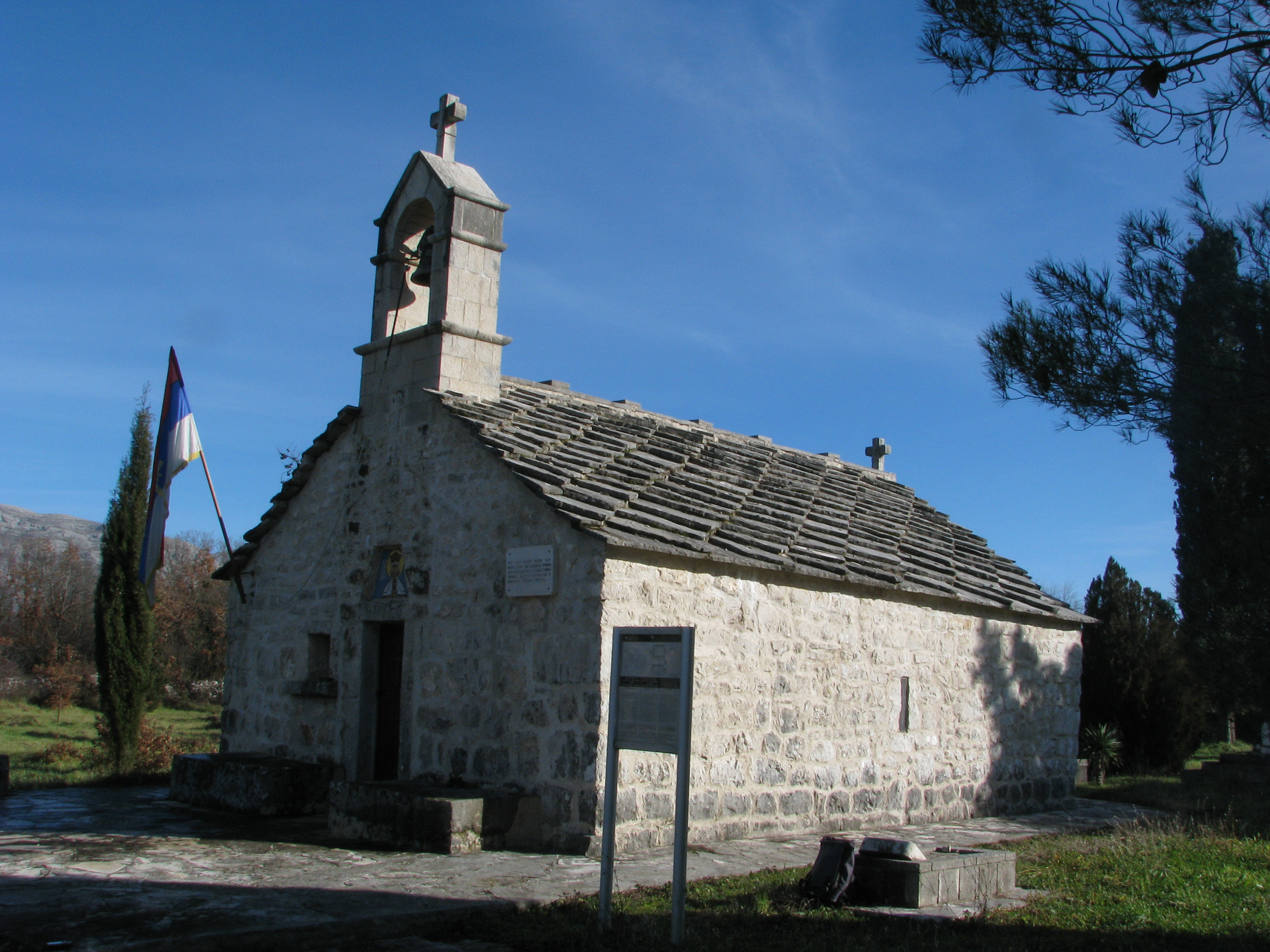
- Taleža in 2014

- Location within Bosnia and Herzegovina
- Coordinates: 42°42′39″N 18°13′57″E
- Country: Bosnia and Herzegovina
- Entity: Republika Srpska
- Municipality: Trebinje
- Time zone: UTC+1 (CET)
  - Summer (DST): UTC+2 (CEST)

Taleža (Serbian Cyrillic: Талежа) is a village in the municipality of Trebinje, Republika Srpska, Bosnia and Herzegovina.
