= Jazina =

Jazina Јазина
- Village
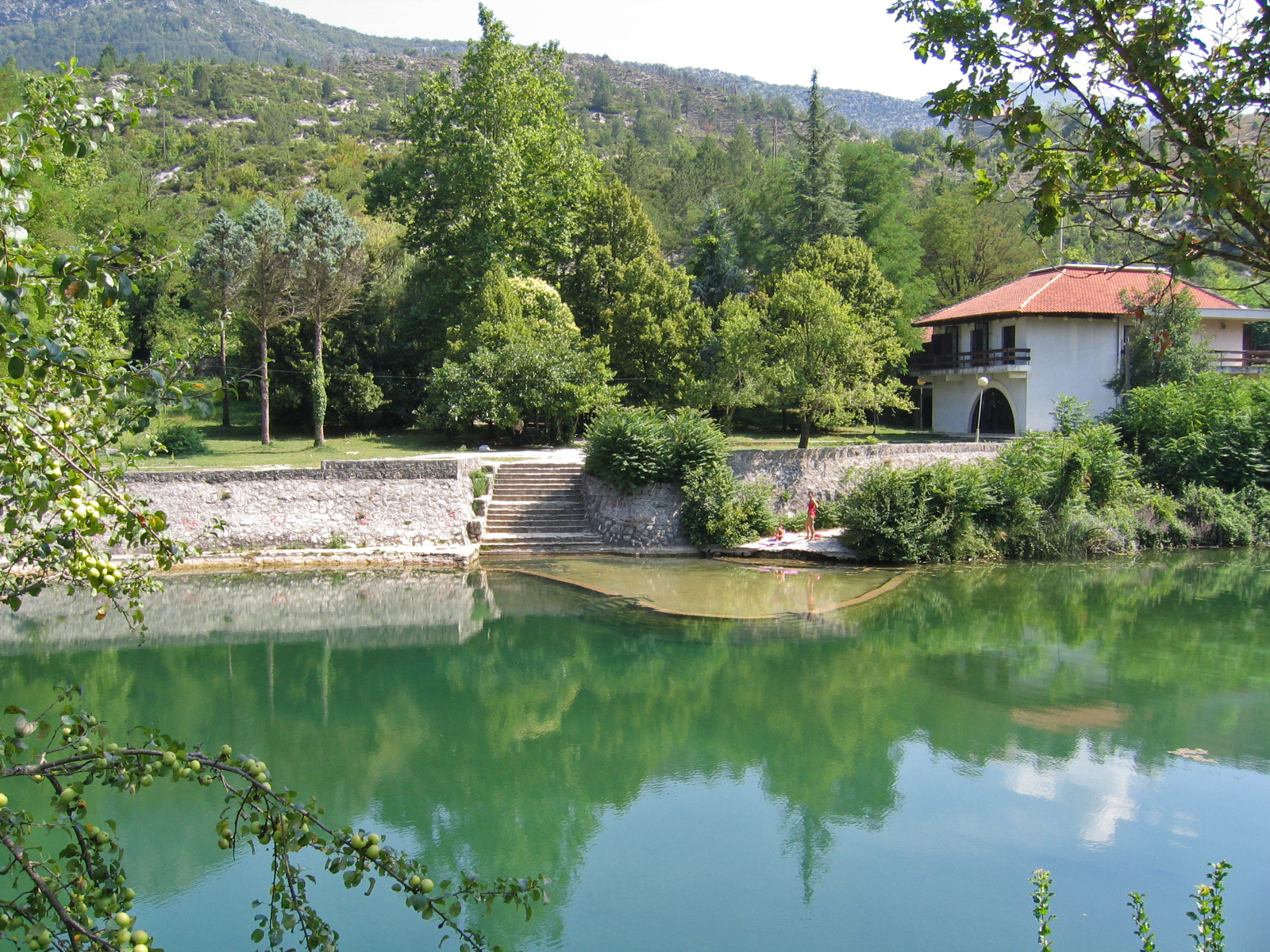
- Lastva Jazina

- Location within Bosnia and Herzegovina
- Coordinates: 42°42′18″N 18°30′2″E
- Country: Bosnia and Herzegovina
- Entity: Republika Srpska
- Municipality: Trebinje
- Time zone: UTC+1 (CET)
  - Summer (DST): UTC+2 (CEST)

Jazina (Serbian Cyrillic: Јазина) is a village in the municipality of Trebinje, Republika Srpska, Bosnia and Herzegovina.
