= Grapska Donja =

Grapska Donja Грапска Доња
- Village
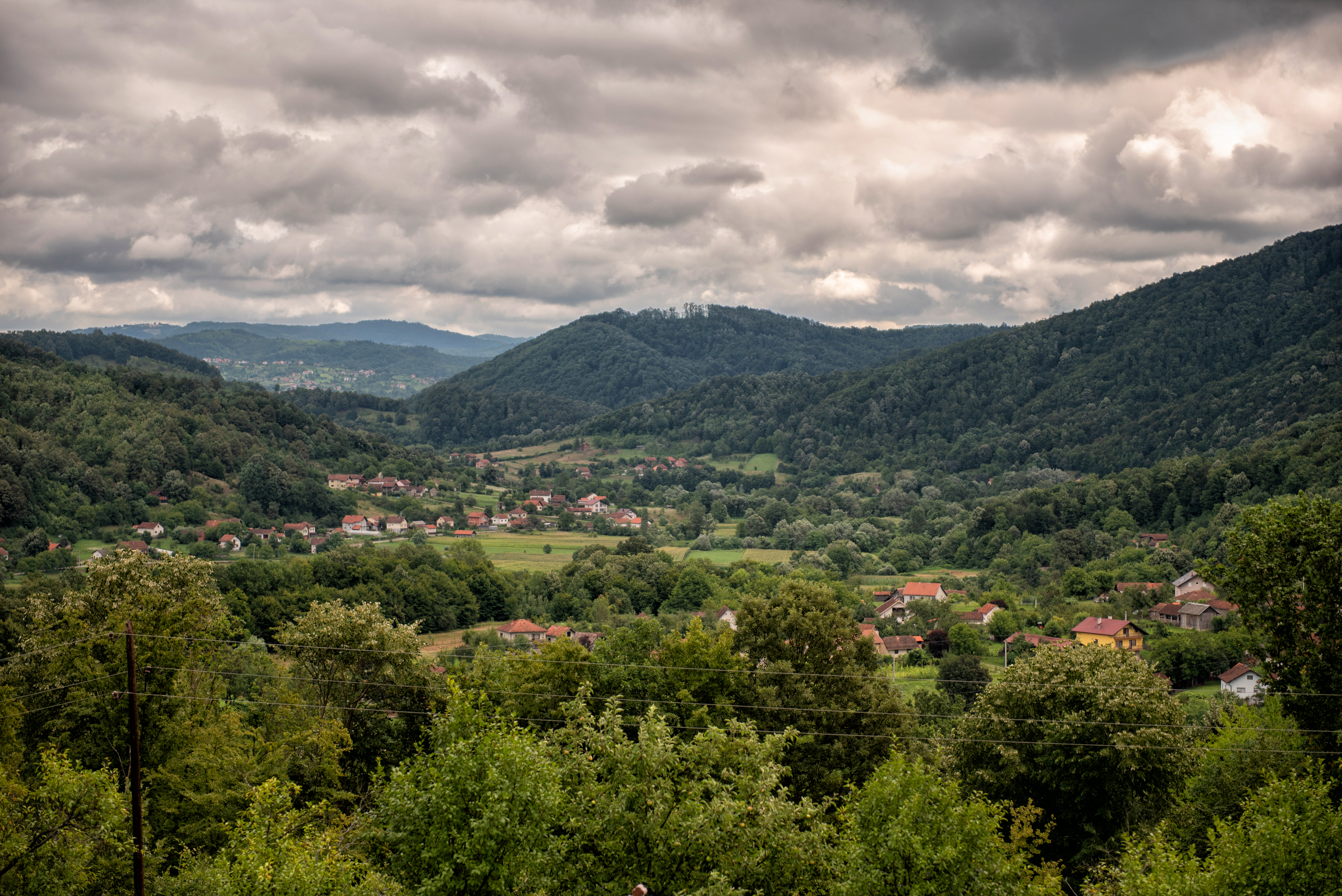

- Location within Bosnia and Herzegovina
- Coordinates: 44°47′17″N 18°05′10″E
- Country: Bosnia and Herzegovina
- Entity: Republika Srpska
- Municipality: Doboj
- Time zone: UTC+1 (CET)
  - Summer (DST): UTC+2 (CEST)

Grapska Donja (Cyrillic: Грапска Доња) is a village in the municipality of Doboj, Republika Srpska, Bosnia and Herzegovina.
