= List of settlements in the Federation of Bosnia and Herzegovina/LJ =

== Lje ==
Ljeskovik, Ljesovina

== Lju ==
Ljubuča, Ljubuški, Ljuta
