= Ljubuča =

Ljubuča Љубуча
- Village
- Location within Bosnia and Herzegovina
- Country: Bosnia and Herzegovina
- Entity: Federation of Bosnia and Herzegovina
- Canton: Herzegovina-Neretva
- Municipality: Konjic

Area
  - Total: 3.34 sq mi (8.66 km^{2})

Population (2013)
  - Total: 27
  - Density: 8.1/sq mi (3.1/km^{2})
- Time zone: UTC+1 (CET)
  - Summer (DST): UTC+2 (CEST)

Ljubuča (Cyrillic: Љубуча) is a village in the municipality of Konjic, Bosnia and Herzegovina.

== Demographics ==
According to the 2013 census, its population was 27, all Bosniaks.
