= Ljesovina =

Ljesovina Љесовина
- Village
- Location within Bosnia and Herzegovina
- Coordinates: 43°45′21″N 17°50′13″E
- Country: Bosnia and Herzegovina
- Entity: Federation of Bosnia and Herzegovina
- Canton: Herzegovina-Neretva
- Municipality: Konjic

Area
  - Total: 1.09 sq mi (2.83 km^{2})

Population (2013)
  - Total: 9
  - Density: 8.2/sq mi (3.2/km^{2})
- Time zone: UTC+1 (CET)
  - Summer (DST): UTC+2 (CEST)

Ljesovina (Cyrillic: Љесовина) is a village in the municipality of Konjic, Bosnia and Herzegovina.

== Demographics ==
According to the 2013 census, its population was 9, all Croats.
