= Lipnica Donja =

- Village
- Location within Bosnia and Herzegovina
- Coordinates: 44.5538536°N 18.6066234°E
- Country: Bosnia and Herzegovina
- Entity: Federation of Bosnia and Herzegovina
- Canton: Tuzla
- Municipality: Tuzla

Area
  - Total: 1.05 sq mi (2.71 km^{2})

Population (2013)
  - Total: 290
  - Density: 280/sq mi (110/km^{2})
- Time zone: UTC+1 (CET)
  - Summer (DST): UTC+2 (CEST)

Lipnica Donja is a village in the municipality of Tuzla, Tuzla Canton, Bosnia and Herzegovina.

== Demographics ==
According to the 2013 census, its population was 290.

Ethnicity in 2013
| Ethnicity | Number | Percentage |
|---|---|---|
| Croats | 247 | 85.2% |
| Bosniaks | 26 | 9.0% |
| Serbs | 8 | 2.8% |
| other/undeclared | 9 | 3.1% |
| Total | 290 | 100% |
