= Breške =

Village in Bosnia and Herzegovina

- Village
- Location within Bosnia and Herzegovina
- Coordinates: 44.6114405°N 18.6444112°E
- Country: Bosnia and Herzegovina
- Entity: Federation of Bosnia and Herzegovina
- Canton: Tuzla
- Municipality: Tuzla

Area
  - Total: 3.81 sq mi (9.88 km^{2})

Population (2013)
  - Total: 600
  - Density: 160/sq mi (61/km^{2})
- Time zone: UTC+1 (CET)
  - Summer (DST): UTC+2 (CEST)

Breške is a village in the municipality of Tuzla, Tuzla Canton, Bosnia and Herzegovina.

== Demographics ==
According to the 2013 census, its population was 600.

Ethnicity in 2013
Ethnicity	Number	Percentage
Croats	368	61.3%
Bosniaks	197	32.8%
Serbs	7	1.2%
other/undeclared	28	4.7%
Total	600	100%
