= Pasci Donji =

- Village
- Location within Bosnia and Herzegovina
- Coordinates: 44.4922904°N 18.6555149°E
- Country: Bosnia and Herzegovina
- Entity: Federation of Bosnia and Herzegovina
- Canton: Tuzla
- Municipality: Tuzla

Area
  - Total: 1.56 sq mi (4.03 km^{2})

Population (2013)
  - Total: 1,092
  - Density: 702/sq mi (271/km^{2})
- Time zone: UTC+1 (CET)
  - Summer (DST): UTC+2 (CEST)

Pasci Donji is a village in the municipality of Tuzla, Tuzla Canton, Bosnia and Herzegovina.

== Demographics ==
According to the 2013 census, its population was 1,092.

Ethnicity in 2013
Ethnicity	Number	Percentage
Bosniaks	1,008	92.3%
Croats	46	4.2%
Serbs	7	0.6%
other/undeclared	31	2.8%
Total	1,092	100%
