= Bačvice =

- Village
- Location within Bosnia and Herzegovina
- Coordinates: 44.2292517°N 17.5596503°E
- Country: Bosnia and Herzegovina
- Entity: Federation of Bosnia and Herzegovina
- Canton: Central Bosnia
- Municipality: Travnik

Area
  - Total: 0.69 sq mi (1.78 km^{2})

Population (2013)
  - Total: 574
  - Density: 835/sq mi (322/km^{2})
- Time zone: UTC+1 (CET)
  - Summer (DST): UTC+2 (CEST)

Bačvice is a village in the municipality of Travnik, Bosnia and Herzegovina.

== Demographics ==
According to the 2013 census, its population was 574.

Ethnicity in 2013
| Ethnicity | Number | Percentage |
|---|---|---|
| Bosniaks | 569 | 99.1% |
| Croats | 2 | 0.3% |
| other/undeclared | 3 | 0.5% |
| Total | 574 | 100% |
