= Par Selo Gornje =

- Village
- Location within Bosnia and Herzegovina
- Coordinates: 44.4972727°N 18.6744332°E
- Country: Bosnia and Herzegovina
- Entity: Federation of Bosnia and Herzegovina
- Canton: Tuzla
- Municipality: Tuzla

Area
  - Total: 1.43 sq mi (3.71 km^{2})

Population (2013)
  - Total: 435
  - Density: 304/sq mi (117/km^{2})
- Time zone: UTC+1 (CET)
  - Summer (DST): UTC+2 (CEST)

Par Selo Gornje is a village in the municipality of Tuzla, Tuzla Canton, Bosnia and Herzegovina.

== Demographics ==
According to the 2013 census, its population was 435.

Ethnicity in 2013
Ethnicity	Number	Percentage
Croats	414	95.2%
Bosniaks	6	1.4%
Serbs	2	0.5%
other/undeclared	13	3.0%
Total	435	100%
