= Milešići =

- Village
- Location within Bosnia and Herzegovina
- Coordinates: 44.5623661°N 18.5609937°E
- Country: Bosnia and Herzegovina
- Entity: Federation of Bosnia and Herzegovina
- Canton: Tuzla
- Municipality: Tuzla

Area
  - Total: 0.75 sq mi (1.94 km^{2})

Population (2013)
  - Total: 1,029
  - Density: 1,370/sq mi (530/km^{2})
- Time zone: UTC+1 (CET)
  - Summer (DST): UTC+2 (CEST)

Milešići is a village in the municipality of Tuzla, Tuzla Canton, Bosnia and Herzegovina.

== Demographics ==
According to the 2013 census, its population was 1,029.

Ethnicity in 2013
Ethnicity	Number	Percentage
Bosniaks	839	81.5%
Croats	106	10.3%
Serbs	2	0.2%
other/undeclared	82	8.0%
Total	1,029	100%
