= Ševar =

- Village
- Location within Bosnia and Herzegovina
- Coordinates: 44.5006448°N 18.5707521°E
- Country: Bosnia and Herzegovina
- Entity: Federation of Bosnia and Herzegovina
- Canton: Tuzla
- Municipality: Tuzla

Area
  - Total: 1.08 sq mi (2.79 km^{2})

Population (2013)
  - Total: 859
  - Density: 797/sq mi (308/km^{2})
- Time zone: UTC+1 (CET)
  - Summer (DST): UTC+2 (CEST)

Ševar is a village in the municipality of Tuzla, Tuzla Canton, Bosnia and Herzegovina.

== Demographics ==
According to the 2013 census, its population was 859.

Ethnicity in 2013
Ethnicity	Number	Percentage
Bosniaks	780	90.8%
Croats	34	4.0%
Serbs	5	0.6%
other/undeclared	40	4.7%
Total	859	100%
