= Dragunja Gornja =

- Village
- Location within Bosnia and Herzegovina
- Coordinates: 44.6469263°N 18.6154733°E
- Country: Bosnia and Herzegovina
- Entity: Federation of Bosnia and Herzegovina
- Canton: Tuzla
- Municipality: Tuzla

Area
  - Total: 2.32 sq mi (6.00 km^{2})

Population (2013)
  - Total: 149
  - Density: 64.3/sq mi (24.8/km^{2})
- Time zone: UTC+1 (CET)
  - Summer (DST): UTC+2 (CEST)

Dragunja Gornja is a village in the municipality of Tuzla, Tuzla Canton, Bosnia and Herzegovina.

== Demographics ==
According to the 2013 census, its population was 149.

Ethnicity in 2013
Ethnicity	Number	Percentage
Croats	78	52.3%
Serbs	67	45.0%
other/undeclared	4	2.7%
Total	149	100%
