= Rapače =

- Village
- Location within Bosnia and Herzegovina
- Coordinates: 44.5450012°N 18.5962763°E
- Country: Bosnia and Herzegovina
- Entity: Federation of Bosnia and Herzegovina
- Canton: Tuzla
- Municipality: Tuzla

Area
  - Total: 0.87 sq mi (2.25 km^{2})

Population (2013)
  - Total: 351
  - Density: 404/sq mi (156/km^{2})
- Time zone: UTC+1 (CET)
  - Summer (DST): UTC+2 (CEST)

Rapače is a village in the municipality of Tuzla, Tuzla Canton, Bosnia and Herzegovina.

== Demographics ==
According to the 2013 census, its population was 351.

Ethnicity in 2013
Ethnicity	Number	Percentage
Croats	311	88.6%
Serbs	14	4.0%
Bosniaks	6	1.7%
other/undeclared	20	5.7%
Total	351	100%
