= Marinkovići =

- Village
- Location within Bosnia and Herzegovina
- Coordinates: 44.6352536°N 18.6357523°E
- Country: Bosnia and Herzegovina
- Entity: Federation of Bosnia and Herzegovina
- Canton: Tuzla
- Municipality: Tuzla

Area
  - Total: 1.00 sq mi (2.60 km^{2})

Population (2013)
  - Total: 80
  - Density: 80/sq mi (31/km^{2})
- Time zone: UTC+1 (CET)
  - Summer (DST): UTC+2 (CEST)

Marinkovići is a village in the municipality of Tuzla, Tuzla Canton, Bosnia and Herzegovina.

== Demographics ==
According to the 2013 census, its population was 80.

Ethnicity in 2013
Ethnicity	Number	Percentage
Croats	69	86.3%
Bosniaks	1	1.3%
other/undeclared	10	12.5%
Total	80	100%
