= Donja Trebeuša =

- Village
- Location within Bosnia and Herzegovina
- Coordinates: 44.2197823°N 17.5339004°E
- Country: Bosnia and Herzegovina
- Entity: Federation of Bosnia and Herzegovina
- Canton: Central Bosnia
- Municipality: Travnik

Area
  - Total: 1.03 sq mi (2.66 km^{2})

Population (2013)
  - Total: 87
  - Density: 85/sq mi (33/km^{2})
- Time zone: UTC+1 (CET)
  - Summer (DST): UTC+2 (CEST)

Donja Trebeuša is a village in the municipality of Travnik, Bosnia and Herzegovina.

== Demographics ==
According to the 2013 census, its population was 87.

Ethnicity in 2013
Ethnicity	Number	Percentage
Bosniaks	73	83.9%
Serbs	8	9.2%
other/undeclared	6	6.9%
Total	87	100%
