= Donje Krčevine =

- Village
- Location within Bosnia and Herzegovina
- Coordinates: 44.2631356°N 17.5010133°E
- Country: Bosnia and Herzegovina
- Entity: Federation of Bosnia and Herzegovina
- Canton: Central Bosnia
- Municipality: Travnik

Area
  - Total: 1.26 sq mi (3.27 km^{2})

Population (2013)
  - Total: 317
  - Density: 251/sq mi (96.9/km^{2})
- Time zone: UTC+1 (CET)
  - Summer (DST): UTC+2 (CEST)

Donje Krčevine is a village in the municipality of Travnik, Bosnia and Herzegovina.

== Demographics ==
According to the 2013 census, its population was 317.

Ethnicity in 2013
Ethnicity	Number	Percentage
Bosniaks	239	75.4%
Croats	14	4.4%
other/undeclared	64	20.2%
Total	317	100%
