= Obodnica Gornja =

- Village
- Location within Bosnia and Herzegovina
- Coordinates: 44.6318845°N 18.6398259°E
- Country: Bosnia and Herzegovina
- Entity: Federation of Bosnia and Herzegovina
- Canton: Tuzla
- Municipality: Tuzla

Area
  - Total: 2.08 sq mi (5.40 km^{2})

Population (2013)
  - Total: 269
  - Density: 129/sq mi (49.8/km^{2})
- Time zone: UTC+1 (CET)
  - Summer (DST): UTC+2 (CEST)

Obodnica Gornja is a village in the municipality of Tuzla, Tuzla Canton, Bosnia and Herzegovina.

== Demographics ==
According to the 2013 census, its population was 269.

Ethnicity in 2013
Ethnicity	Number	Percentage
Croats	266	98.9%
Bosniaks	3	1.1%
Total	269	100%
