= Miškića Brdo =

- Village
- Location within Bosnia and Herzegovina
- Coordinates: 44.2305356°N 17.6147308°E
- Country: Bosnia and Herzegovina
- Entity: Federation of Bosnia and Herzegovina
- Canton: Central Bosnia
- Municipality: Travnik

Area
  - Total: 0.23 sq mi (0.60 km^{2})

Population (2013)
  - Total: 90
  - Density: 390/sq mi (150/km^{2})
- Time zone: UTC+1 (CET)
  - Summer (DST): UTC+2 (CEST)

Miškića Brdo is a village in the municipality of Travnik, Bosnia and Herzegovina.

== Demographics ==
According to the 2013 census, its population was 90.

Ethnicity in 2013
Ethnicity	Number	Percentage
Croats	86	95.6%
Serbs	2	2.2%
other/undeclared	2	2.2%
Total	90	100%
