= Podstinje =

- Village
- Location within Bosnia and Herzegovina
- Coordinates: 44.2605008°N 17.7283822°E
- Country: Bosnia and Herzegovina
- Entity: Federation of Bosnia and Herzegovina
- Canton: Central Bosnia
- Municipality: Travnik

Area
  - Total: 0.53 sq mi (1.37 km^{2})

Population (2013)
  - Total: 538
  - Density: 1,020/sq mi (393/km^{2})
- Time zone: UTC+1 (CET)
  - Summer (DST): UTC+2 (CEST)

Podstinje is a village in the municipality of Travnik, Bosnia and Herzegovina.

== Demographics ==
According to the 2013 census, its population was 538.

Ethnicity in 2013
Ethnicity	Number	Percentage
Bosniaks	509	94.6%
Croats	27	5.0%
other/undeclared	2	0.4%
Total	538	100%
