= Radića Brdo =

- Village
- Location within Bosnia and Herzegovina
- Coordinates: 44.2356803°N 17.63613°E
- Country: Bosnia and Herzegovina
- Entity: Federation of Bosnia and Herzegovina
- Canton: Central Bosnia
- Municipality: Travnik

Area
  - Total: 0.14 sq mi (0.36 km^{2})

Population (2013)
  - Total: 230
  - Density: 1,700/sq mi (640/km^{2})
- Time zone: UTC+1 (CET)
  - Summer (DST): UTC+2 (CEST)

Radića Brdo is a village in the municipality of Travnik, Bosnia and Herzegovina.

== Demographics ==
According to the 2013 census, its population was 230.

Ethnicity in 2013
Ethnicity	Number	Percentage
Croats	131	57.0%
Bosniaks	97	42.2%
Serbs	2	0.9
Total	230	100%
