= Lovrići =

- Village
- Location within Bosnia and Herzegovina
- Coordinates: 44.2331084°N 17.6170553°E
- Country: Bosnia and Herzegovina
- Entity: Federation of Bosnia and Herzegovina
- Canton: Central Bosnia
- Municipality: Travnik

Area
  - Total: 0.12 sq mi (0.30 km^{2})

Population (2013)
  - Total: 106
  - Density: 920/sq mi (350/km^{2})
- Time zone: UTC+1 (CET)
  - Summer (DST): UTC+2 (CEST)

Lovrići is a village in the municipality of Travnik, Bosnia and Herzegovina.

== Demographics ==
According to the 2013 census, its population was 106.

Ethnicity in 2013
Ethnicity	Number	Percentage
Croats	97	91.5%
Bosniaks	3	2.8%
Serbs	6	5.7%
Total	106	100%
