= Svojtina =

- Village
- Location within Bosnia and Herzegovina
- Coordinates: 44.5753023°N 18.70379°E
- Country: Bosnia and Herzegovina
- Entity: Federation of Bosnia and Herzegovina
- Canton: Tuzla
- Municipality: Tuzla

Area
  - Total: 0.99 sq mi (2.57 km^{2})

Population (2013)
  - Total: 82
  - Density: 83/sq mi (32/km^{2})
- Time zone: UTC+1 (CET)
  - Summer (DST): UTC+2 (CEST)

Svojtina is a village in the municipality of Tuzla, Tuzla Canton, Bosnia and Herzegovina.

== Demographics ==
According to the 2013 census, its population was 82.

Ethnicity in 2013
Ethnicity	Number	Percentage
Croats	81	20.1%
Bosniaks	1	78.4%
Total	82	100%
