= Fazlići =

- Village
- Location within Bosnia and Herzegovina
- Coordinates: 44.2710651°N 17.7274709°E
- Country: Bosnia and Herzegovina
- Entity: Federation of Bosnia and Herzegovina
- Canton: Central Bosnia
- Municipality: Travnik

Area
  - Total: 0.30 sq mi (0.77 km^{2})

Population (2013)
  - Total: 194
  - Density: 650/sq mi (250/km^{2})
- Time zone: UTC+1 (CET)
  - Summer (DST): UTC+2 (CEST)

Fazlići is a village in the municipality of Travnik, Bosnia and Herzegovina.

== Demographics ==
According to the 2013 census, its population was 194.

Ethnicity in 2013
Ethnicity	Number	Percentage
Bosniaks	193	99.5%
other/undeclared	1	0.5%
Total	194	100%
