= Kljaci =

- Village
- Location within Bosnia and Herzegovina
- Coordinates: 44.2111218°N 17.7693834°E
- Country: Bosnia and Herzegovina
- Entity: Federation of Bosnia and Herzegovina
- Canton: Central Bosnia
- Municipality: Travnik

Area
  - Total: 1.09 sq mi (2.82 km^{2})

Population (2013)
  - Total: 634
  - Density: 582/sq mi (225/km^{2})
- Time zone: UTC+1 (CET)
  - Summer (DST): UTC+2 (CEST)

Kljaci is a village in the municipality of Travnik, Bosnia and Herzegovina.

== Demographics ==
According to a 2013 census, its population was 634.

Ethnicity in 2013
Ethnicity	Number	Percentage
Bosniaks	627	98.9%
other/undeclared	7	1.1%
Total	634	100%
