= Kundići =

- Village
- Location within Bosnia and Herzegovina
- Coordinates: 44.2211637°N 17.5979571°E
- Country: Bosnia and Herzegovina
- Entity: Federation of Bosnia and Herzegovina
- Canton: Central Bosnia
- Municipality: Travnik

Area
  - Total: 0.68 sq mi (1.77 km^{2})

Population (2013)
  - Total: 84
  - Density: 120/sq mi (47/km^{2})
- Time zone: UTC+1 (CET)
  - Summer (DST): UTC+2 (CEST)

Kundići is a village in the municipality of Travnik, Bosnia and Herzegovina.

== Demographics ==
According to the 2013 census, its population was 84.

Ethnicity in 2013
Ethnicity	Number	Percentage
Bosniaks	78	92.9%
other/undeclared	6	7.1%
Total	84	100%
