= Veliko Očijevo =

Veliko Očijevo Велико Очијево
- Village
- Location within Bosnia and Herzegovina
- Coordinates: 44°29′N 16°13′E
- Country: Bosnia and Herzegovina
- Entity: Federation of Bosnia and Herzegovina
- Canton: Una-Sana
- Municipality: Bihać

Area
  - Total: 14.26 sq mi (36.93 km^{2})

Population (2013)
  - Total: 19
  - Density: 1.3/sq mi (0.51/km^{2})
- Time zone: UTC+1 (CET)
  - Summer (DST): UTC+2 (CEST)

Veliko Očijevo (Serbian Cyrillic: Велико Очијево) is a village in the municipality of Bihać, Bosnia and Herzegovina.

== Demographics ==
According to the 2013 census, its population was 19, all Serbs.
