= Plavčići =

Village in Zenica municipality, Bosnia and Herzegovina

- Village
- Location within Bosnia and Herzegovina
- Coordinates: 44°10′06″N 18°02′17″E
- Country: Bosnia and Herzegovina
- Entity: Federation of Bosnia and Herzegovina
- Canton: Zenica-Doboj
- Municipality: Zenica

Area
  - Total: 1.09 sq mi (2.82 km^{2})

Population (2013)
  - Total: 0
  - Density: 0.0/sq mi (0.0/km^{2})
- Time zone: UTC+1 (CET)
  - Summer (DST): UTC+2 (CEST)

Plavčići is an uninhabited village in the municipality of Zenica, Bosnia and Herzegovina.

== Demographics ==
According to the 2013 census, its population was nil, down from 8 in 1991.
