= Cviljevina =

- Village
- Location within Bosnia and Herzegovina
- Coordinates: 44.5604°N 18.8018°E
- Country: Bosnia and Herzegovina
- Entity: Federation of Bosnia and Herzegovina
- Canton: Tuzla
- Municipality: Tuzla

Area
  - Total: 1.71 sq mi (4.44 km^{2})

Population (2013)
  - Total: 0
  - Density: 0.0/sq mi (0.0/km^{2})
- Time zone: UTC+1 (CET)
  - Summer (DST): UTC+2 (CEST)

Cviljevina is a village in the municipality of Tuzla, Tuzla Canton, Bosnia and Herzegovina.

== Demographics ==
According to the 2013 census, its population was nil, down from 210 in 1991.
