= Zlatnik =

Zlatnik may refer to:

- Zlatník, village and municipality in Vranov nad Topľou District in the Prešov Region of eastern Slovakia
- Zlatnik, Višegrad, village in the municipality of Višegrad, Bosnia and Herzegovina
