= Krajkovići =

Krajkovići may refer to the following places in Bosnia and Herzegovina:

- Krajkovići, Konjic
- Krajkovići, Trebinje
