= Prići =

- Village
- Location within Bosnia and Herzegovina
- Coordinates: 44.2165691°N 17.5894049°E
- Country: Bosnia and Herzegovina
- Entity: Federation of Bosnia and Herzegovina
- Canton: Central Bosnia
- Municipality: Travnik

Area
  - Total: 1.04 sq mi (2.69 km^{2})

Population (2013)
  - Total: 198
  - Density: 191/sq mi (73.6/km^{2})
- Time zone: UTC+1 (CET)
  - Summer (DST): UTC+2 (CEST)

Prići is a village in the municipality of Travnik, Bosnia and Herzegovina.

== Demographics ==
According to the 2013 census, its population was 198, all Croats.
