= Lapja =

Lapja Лапја
- Village
- Location within Bosnia and Herzegovina
- Coordinates: 42°39′N 18°19′E
- Country: Bosnia and Herzegovina
- Entity: Republika Srpska
- Municipality: Trebinje
- Time zone: UTC+1 (CET)
  - Summer (DST): UTC+2 (CEST)

Lapja (Serbian Cyrillic: Лапја) is a village in the municipality of Trebinje, Republika Srpska, Bosnia and Herzegovina. According to the preliminary results of the 2013 census, Lapja had a population of about 207 people. Lapja is located at an elevation of approximately 308 to 327 meters above sea level.
