= Opsine =

Coordinates: 44.7903°N 18.0183°E

Opsine Опсине
- Village
- Location within Bosnia and Herzegovina
- Country: Bosnia and Herzegovina
- Entity: Republika Srpska
- Municipality: Doboj
- Time zone: UTC+1 (CET)
  - Summer (DST): UTC+2 (CEST)

Opsine (Cyrillic: Опсине) is a village in the municipality of Doboj, Bosnia and Herzegovina.

== Population ==
Demographics
Year	Residents
1961	371
1971	375
1981	376
1991	350
