= Ždrijelovići =

Ždrijelovići Ждријеловићи
- Village
- Location within Bosnia and Herzegovina
- Coordinates: 42°50′N 18°17′E
- Country: Bosnia and Herzegovina
- Entity: Republika Srpska
- Municipality: Trebinje
- Time zone: UTC+1 (CET)
  - Summer (DST): UTC+2 (CEST)

Ždrijelovići (Serbian Cyrillic: Ждријеловићи) is a village in the municipality of Trebinje, Republika Srpska, Bosnia and Herzegovina.
