= Kremeni Do =

Kremeni Do Кремени До
- Village
- Location within Bosnia and Herzegovina
- Coordinates: 42°38′11″N 18°19′43″E
- Country: Bosnia and Herzegovina
- Entity: Republika Srpska
- Municipality: Trebinje
- Time zone: UTC+1 (CET)
  - Summer (DST): UTC+2 (CEST)

Kremeni Do (Serbian Cyrillic: Кремени До) is a village in the municipality of Trebinje, Republika Srpska, Bosnia and Herzegovina.
