= Uvjeća =

- Village
- Location within Bosnia and Herzegovina
- Coordinates: 42°38′N 18°22′E
- Country: Bosnia and Herzegovina
- Entity: Republika Srpska
- Municipality: Trebinje
- Elevation: 1,699 ft (518 m)
- Time zone: UTC+1 (CET)
  - Summer (DST): UTC+2 (CEST)

Uvjeća (Serbian Cyrillic: Увјећа) is a village in the municipality of Trebinje, Republika Srpska, Bosnia and Herzegovina.
