= Osječani Gornji =

Osječani Gornji Осјечани Горњи
- Village
- Location within Bosnia and Herzegovina
- Coordinates: 44°50′08″N 18°07′51″E
- Country: Bosnia and Herzegovina
- Entity: Republika Srpska
- Municipality: Doboj
- Time zone: UTC+1 (CET)
  - Summer (DST): UTC+2 (CEST)

Osječani Gornji (Cyrillic: Осјечани Горњи) is a village in the municipality of Doboj, Bosnia and Herzegovina.
