= Nikontovići =

Coordinates: 42°45′35″N 18°17′13″E

Nikontovići Никонтовићи
- Village
- Location within Republika Srpska
- Country: Bosnia and Herzegovina
- Entity: Republika Srpska
- Municipality: Trebinje
- Time zone: UTC+1 (CET)
  - Summer (DST): UTC+2 (CEST)

Nikontovići (Serbian Cyrillic: Никонтовићи) is a village in the municipality of Trebinje, Republika Srpska, Bosnia and Herzegovina.
