= Grmljani =

Grmljani Грмљани
- Village
- Location within Bosnia and Herzegovina
- Coordinates: 42°50′12″N 18°01′46″E
- Country: Bosnia and Herzegovina
- Entity: Republika Srpska
- Municipality: Trebinje
- Time zone: UTC+1 (CET)
  - Summer (DST): UTC+2 (CEST)

Grmljani (Serbian Cyrillic: Грмљани) is a village in the municipality of Trebinje, Republika Srpska, Bosnia and Herzegovina.
