= Prhinje (Trebinje) =

Prhinje Прхиње
- Village
- Location within Bosnia and Herzegovina
- Coordinates: 42°54′14″N 18°01′07″E
- Country: Bosnia and Herzegovina
- Entity: Republika Srpska
- Municipality: Trebinje
- Time zone: UTC+1 (CET)
  - Summer (DST): UTC+2 (CEST)

Prhinje (Serbian Cyrillic: Прхиње) is a village in the municipality of Trebinje, Bosnia and Herzegovina.
