= Lušnica =

Lušnica Лушница
- Village
- Location within Bosnia and Herzegovina
- Coordinates: 42°46′04″N 18°06′18″E
- Country: Bosnia and Herzegovina
- Entity: Republika Srpska
- Municipality: Trebinje
- Time zone: UTC+1 (CET)
  - Summer (DST): UTC+2 (CEST)

Lušnica (Serbian Cyrillic: Лушница) is a village in the municipality of Trebinje, Republika Srpska, Bosnia and Herzegovina.
