= Uništa, Višegrad =

Uništa
- Village
- Location within Bosnia and Herzegovina
- Coordinates: 43°45′56″N 19°18′01″E
- Country: Bosnia and Herzegovina
- Entity: Republika Srpska
- Municipality: Višegrad

Population (1991)
  - Total: 37
- Time zone: UTC+1 (CET)
  - Summer (DST): UTC+2 (CEST)

Uništa (Serbian: Уништа) is a village in the municipality of Višegrad, Bosnia and Herzegovina.
