= Bučinovići =

- Village
- Location within Bosnia and Herzegovina
- Coordinates: 44°06′41″N 19°12′08″E
- Country: Bosnia and Herzegovina
- Municipality: Srebrenica

Population (2013)
  - Total: 215
- Time zone: UTC+1 (CET)
  - Summer (DST): UTC+2 (CEST)

Bučinovići (Serbian: Бучиновићи) is a village in the municipality of Srebrenica, Bosnia and Herzegovina. As of 2013 it had a population of 215.
