= Tekućica =

Tekućica Текућица
- Village
- Location within Bosnia and Herzegovina
- Coordinates: 44°41′45″N 18°10′32″E
- Country: Bosnia and Herzegovina
- Entity: Republika Srpska
- Municipality: Doboj
- Time zone: UTC+1 (CET)
  - Summer (DST): UTC+2 (CEST)

Tekućica (Cyrillic: Текућица) is a village in the municipality of Doboj, Republika Srpska, Bosnia and Herzegovina.
