= Porječje =

Porječje Порјечје
- Village
- Location within Bosnia and Herzegovina
- Coordinates: 44°47′50″N 18°07′20″E
- Country: Bosnia and Herzegovina
- Entity: Republika Srpska
- Municipality: Doboj
- Time zone: UTC+1 (CET)
  - Summer (DST): UTC+2 (CEST)

Porječje (Cyrillic: Порјечје) is a village in the municipality of Doboj, Republika Srpska, Bosnia and Herzegovina.
