= Vučija =

Vučija Вучија
- Village
- Location within Bosnia and Herzegovina
- Coordinates: 42°41′N 18°33′E
- Country: Bosnia and Herzegovina
- Entity: Republika Srpska
- Municipality: Trebinje
- Time zone: UTC+1 (CET)
  - Summer (DST): UTC+2 (CEST)

Vučija (Serbian Cyrillic: Вучија) is a village in the municipality of Trebinje, Republika Srpska, Bosnia and Herzegovina.
