= Rodić Brdo =

Coordinates: 43°47′16″N 19°18′27″E

- Village
- Interactive map of Rodić Brdo
- Country: Bosnia and Herzegovina
- Entity: Republika Srpska
- Municipality: Višegrad
- Time zone: UTC+1 (CET)
  - Summer (DST): UTC+2 (CEST)

Rodić Brdo (Serbian: Родић Брдо) is a village in the municipality of Višegrad, Bosnia and Herzegovina.
