= Mala Daljegošta =

- Village
- Location within Bosnia and Herzegovina
- Coordinates: 44°00′53″N 19°32′27″E
- Country: Bosnia and Herzegovina
- Municipality: Srebrenica
- Time zone: UTC+1 (CET)
  - Summer (DST): UTC+2 (CEST)

Mala Daljegošta (Serbian: Мала Даљегошта) is a village in the municipality of Srebrenica, Bosnia and Herzegovina.
