= Mramorice =

Coordinates: 43°42′24″N 19°11′35″E

- Village
- Interactive map of Mramorice
- Country: Bosnia and Herzegovina
- Entity: Republika Srpska
- Municipality: Višegrad
- Time zone: UTC+1 (CET)
  - Summer (DST): UTC+2 (CEST)

Mramorice (Serbian: Мраморине) is a village in the municipality of Višegrad, Bosnia and Herzegovina.
