= Slatina (Srebrenica) =

- Village
- Location within Bosnia and Herzegovina
- Coordinates: 44°08′47″N 19°11′47″E
- Country: Bosnia and Herzegovina
- Municipality: Srebrenica
- Time zone: UTC+1 (CET)
  - Summer (DST): UTC+2 (CEST)

Slatina (Serbian: Слатина) is a village in the municipality of Srebrenica, Bosnia and Herzegovina.
