= Vodenice =

Coordinates: 43°46′53″N 19°18′23″E

- Village
- Interactive map of Vodenice
- Country: Bosnia and Herzegovina
- Entity: Republika Srpska
- Municipality: Višegrad
- Time zone: UTC+1 (CET)
  - Summer (DST): UTC+2 (CEST)

Vodenice (Serbian: Воденице) is a village in the municipality of Višegrad, Bosnia and Herzegovina.
