= Brakovci =

- Village
- Location within Bosnia and Herzegovina
- Coordinates: 44°06′51″N 19°13′08″E
- Country: Bosnia and Herzegovina
- Municipality: Srebrenica
- Time zone: UTC+1 (CET)
  - Summer (DST): UTC+2 (CEST)

Brakovci (Serbian: Браковци) is a village in the municipality of Srebrenica, Bosnia and Herzegovina.
