= List of mosques in Bosnia and Herzegovina =

This is a list of mosques in Bosnia and Herzegovina listed by political division, from the earliest to the most recent construction, where known.

There were 4,190 Islamic places of worship in Bosnia and Herzegovina before the 1992–1995 war, including 1,149 mosques. A great number of them (up to 80% according to some sources) were damaged or destroyed during the conflict.

== List of mosques ==
=== Brčko District ===
| Name | Image | Location | Year (CE) | Remarks |
|---|---|---|---|---|
| Azizija džamija | | Brčko, Brezovo Polje | 1862 | |

=== Federation of Bosnia and Herzegovina ===
| Name | Image | Location | Year (CE) | Remarks |
|---|---|---|---|---|
| Fethija Mosque (Süleymaniye Mosque) | | Bihać | 1266 | Built in 1266 as a Catholic church of St. Anthony of Padua in the Gothic style; transformed into a mosque following the 1592 conquest of Bihać. |
| Emperor's Mosque (Careva džamija) (Царева џамија) | | Sarajevo | 1457 | National Monument; built in 1457; rebuilt in 1565; destroyed during World War II and the Bosnian War; rebuilt in 2020. |
| Šerefudin's White Mosque (Šerefudinova Bijela džamija) | | Visoko | 1477, reconstructed 1980 | The 15th-century mosque completely reconstructed and finished in 1980, designed by Zlatko Ugljen in the postmodern style, and a recipient of the Aga Khan Award for Architecture in 1983. |
| Čemaluša Mosque (Čemaluševa džamija) | | Sarajevo | 1515 | Demolished in 1940; a residential and commercial building is now located on the former mosque site. |
| Sultan-Sulejmanova džamija | | Blagaj, Mostar | 1519–1520 | |
| Muslihudin Čekrekčija Mosque (Čaršijska) | | Baščaršija, Sarajevo | 1526 | National Monument; with a 32 m-high (105 ft) minaret |
| Sultan Suleiman's Mosque (Sultan-Sulejmanova džamija) (Султан-Сулејманова џамија) | | Jajce | 1528 | Demolished. The 12th-century Catholic church was converted into a mosque in 1528 and named in honour of Suleiman the Magnificent. Devastated by fire in 1658 and 1832, the building has been in ruins since the 19th century. |
| Gazi Husrev-beg Mosque (Gazi Husrev-begova džamija) | | Baščaršija, Sarajevo | 1531 | National Monument; one of the largest mosques in Europe; named in honour of Gazi Husrev-beg; the first mosque to be electrified, in 1898; partially damaged during the Bosnian War and reconstructed in c. 2002. |
| Kuršumlija džamija | | Kladanj | 1545 | Built by hajji Bali-bey |
| Hadži Hasan Mosque (Hadži Hasanova džamija) | | Tuzla | 1548 | Rebuilt several times; including in 1874. |
| Karađoz Bey Mosque (Karađozbegova džamija) | | Mostar | 1557 | National Monument; damaged in World War II; destroyed in 1992 during the Bosnian War; rebuilt in 2004. |
| Hamza-begova džamija | | Sanski Most | 1557 | Destroyed in 1992, re-opened in 2000 |
| Jusuf pašina (Kuršumlija) Mosque | | Maglaj | 1560 | |
| Ali Pasha Mosque (Alipašina džamija) | | Sarajevo | 1560–1561 | National Monument; heavily damaged during the Bosnian War; renovated in 2004. |
| Hadžijska Mosque (Vekil-Harač ili Hadžijska džamija) | | Centar, Sarajevo | 1561 | Founded by Vekil Harč Mustafa; minor damage during the Bosnian War. |
| Baščaršija Mosque | | Baščaršija, Sarajevo | 1561 | |
| Emperor's Mosque (Careva Dzamija) | | Sarajevo | 1462-1565 | First built 1462; rebuilt 1565; renovated in 2020 |
| Čobanija Mosque (Džamija Čobanija) | | Sarajevo | c. 1565 | Stone mosque with minaret. |
| Gazi Turali-begova (Poljska) džamija | | Tuzla | 1572 | |
| Hajji Ahmed the Ducat Minter's Mosque (Džamija Hadži Ahmeta Dukatara) | | Livno | 1574 | National Monument; also known as Glavica, is a mosque complex with adjacent clock tower and necropolis. |
| Repovačka džamija | | Konjic | 1565–1579 | |
| Ahmed-agina dzamija | | Vitez | 1589 | Destroyed in 1993, re-opened in 2001 |
| Ferhadija Mosque (Ferhat Pasha Mosque) (Ferhat-pašina džamija) | | Sarajevo | 16th century | National Monument; damaged during the Bosnian War. |
| Sejmenska džamija | | Zenica | 1500–1600 | |
| Džudža-Džaferova (Čaršijska) džamija | | Tomislavgrad | 1615– | |
| Koski Mehmed Pasha Mosque (Koski Mehmed-pašina džamija) | | Mostar | 1617 | |
| Sultan Ahmed Mosque | | Bugojno | 1693 | |
| Jalska Mosque (Jalska džamija) | | Tuzla | 17th century | National Monument; dome collapsed in 1928. |
| Džindijska Džamija (Huseina Čauša) | | Tuzla | 1707 | Wooden mosque; classical example of wooden vernacular Bosnian-style mosque. |
| Džamija na Karićima also Džamija na Zvijezdi also Hajdar-dedina džamija | | Vareš (Zvijezda Mountain) | 1716 | Wooden mosque; aet alight and burned to the ground in 1993, rebuilt 2001 |
| Sultan-Ahmedova džamija | | Zenica | 1703-1730 | |
| Coloured Mosque (Süleymaniye Mosque) | | Travnik | 1757 | |
| Džamija Miljevići | | Miljevići, Olovo | 17th-18th century | Wooden mosque; renovated in 1936, set alight and burned to the ground in 1992, rebuilt 2013 |
| Old wooden mosque of Tuholj | | Kladanj | 1804 | Wooden mosque; National monument |
| Old wooden mosque (Stara drvena džamija) | | Bužim | 1835 | Wooden mosque |
| Ali-bega Kapetanovića džamija | | Ljubuški (Vitina) | 1858– | Destroyed in 1993, renewed in 2009 |
| Colourful mosque (Atik Behram-begova (Šarena) džamija) | | Tuzla | 1888 (rebuilt) | |
| Trnova Mosque (Trnavska džamija) | | Sanski Most (Trnova) | 1895– | Destroyed in 1991, re-opened in 2009 |
| Bosanska Krupa City Mosque (Gradska džamija) | | Bosanska Krupa | late 19th century | |
| Banovići Mosque | | Banovići | 1939 | Demolished in 1953 |
| Banovići City Mosque (Gradska džamija) | | Banovići | 1997 | |
| Old mosque of Cazin | | Cazin | before 2000 | |
| King Fahd Mosque (Džamija kralja Fahda) | | Sarajevo | 2000 | Established and funded by the Government of Saudi Arabia, the mosque is named in honour of Saudi King Fahd. |
| Izačić new mosque | | Bihać (Stari grad Izačić) | after 2000 | |
| Islamic centre and mosque, Bugojno | | Bugojno | after 2000 | |
| Višići Mosque | | Čapljina | after 2000 | |
| New mosque of Cazin | | Cazin | after 2000 | |
| New mosque of Kakanj | | Kakanj | after 2000 | |
| Mosque of Ključ | | Ključ | after 2000 | |
| Konjic City Mosque (Gradska džamija) | | Konjic | after 2000 | |
| Vrapčići mosque | | Mostar | after 2000 | |
| Zborište mosque | | Velika Kladuša | after 2000 | |
| Ahatovići mosque | | Sarajevo | 2001 | |
| Istiklal Mosque (Istiklal džamija) | | Sarajevo | 2001 | Named after Istiqlal Mosque, Jakarta and funded by the Indonesian Government, the mosque was completed in the postmodern style. |
| Baitus Salam Mosque | | Sarajevo | 2004 | An Ahmadiyya community mosque. |
| Nasubašići Masjid | | Banovići | 2008 | |
| New mosque | | Orašje, Planje | 2011 | |
| New mosque of Ilidža | | Ilidža | after 2012 | |
| Islamic Center Banovići (Islamski Centar Banovići) | | Banovići | 2017 | |
| Ahmići mosque | | Ahmići, Vitez | | Destroyed in 1993 |
| Donji Vakuf Mosque | | Donji Vakuf | | |
| Kajserija Dzamija | | Goražde | | Rebuilt |
| Džamija Husejnija | | Gradačac | | |
| Esma Sultanija Mosque | | Jajce | | |
| Hadadan džamija (Varoš) | | Jajce | | Destroyed during the war; rebuilt 2008-2012 |
| Old mosque of Jajce | | Jajce | | Reconstructed 2008 |
| Ramadan begova džamija | | Jajce | | Wooden mosque, reconstructed |
| Gornji Rainci Mosque | | Kalesija | | |
| Mosque of Brlošci | | Kladanj | | |
| Junuz-Čauševa (Čaršijska) džamija | | Konjic | | |
| Mehmed-Čauševa džamija | | Konjic | | |
| Čuhovići Mosque | | Konjic | | |
| Bjelimići Mosque | | Konjic (Odžaci) | | |
| Kupres Mosque | | Kupres | | |
| Ljubuški Small Old Mosque | | Ljubuški | | |
| Žabljak mosque | | Ljubuški | | |
| Old mosque of Pale-Prača | | Pale-Prača | | |
| Džamija Sultana Mehmeda Fatiha 1463 | | Sanski Most (Donji Kamengrad) | | |
| Stolac Old Mosque | | Stolac | | |
| Teočak Old Mosque | | Teočak | | |
| Gazi Ferhad-begova Džamija | | Tešanj | | |
| Umoljani mosque | | Trnovo | | |
| Turbe mosque | | Turbe | | |
| Mosque of Atik Behram Bey (Atik Behram-begova džamija) | | Tuzla | | Also called the Colorful Mosque. |
| Velika Kladuša central old mosque | | Velika Kladuša | | |
| Velika Kladuša suburb old mosque | | Velika Kladuša | | Restored in 2007 |
| Šantići dzamija | | Vitez | | |
| Tekija Pehare | | Zenica | | |
| Vranduk mosque | | Zenica | | |

=== Republika Srpska ===
| Name | Image | Location | Year (CE) | Remarks |
|---|---|---|---|---|
| Dživar džamija | | Trebinje | 1512 | Destroyed in 1993, re-opened in 2008 |
| Sultan Sulejmanova "Atik" džamija | | Bijeljina | 1520 | Destroyed in 1993, re-opened in 2014; sr:Атик џамија у Бијељини |
| Aladža Mosque (Aladža džamija); Colorful Mosque (Šarena džamija) | | Foča | 1549 | Destroyed in 1993 during the Bosnian War; reconstructed and reopened in 2019 with the financial support of the Turkish Cooperation and Coordination Agency. |
| Sofi Mehmed-pašina džamija (Jama) | | Banja Luka | 1554–1555 | National Monument; destroyed in 1993 |
| Vrbanjska | | Banja Luka | 1554–1555 | National Monument |
| Šišman Ibrahim Paša Mosque (Hadži-Alijina dzamija) | | Počitelj | 1561 to 1562-1563 | |
| Sinan Beg Mosque | | Čajniče | 1570 | Destroyed during the war, reconstructed in 2024 |
| Gazanferija džamija | | Banja Luka | 1578 | Destroyed in 1993, reconstructed ongoing |
| Hadži Begzad džamija (Grabska) | | Banja Luka (Grab-Srpske Toplice) | 1578 | Destroyed in 1993, reconstructed ongoing |
| Ferhat Pasha Mosque (Ferhat-pašina džamija) | | Banja Luka | 1579 | National Monument; destroyed in 1993 during the Bosnian War; reconstructed and reopened in 2016. |
| Arnaudija Mosque (Arnaudija džamija) | | Banja Luka | 1595 | National Monument; destroyed in 1993 during the Bosnian War; reconstructed and reopened in 2024. |
| Hadži Saliha džamija (Stupnička) | | Banja Luka (Mejdan/ Obilićevo) | 1595 | National Monument |
| Behram-begova džamija; Behram-efendijina džamija | | Banja Luka | c. 1600 | Destroyed in 1993, reconstructed 1999 |
| Hadži Omerova džamija (Dolačka) | | Banja Luka (Dolac) | c. 1600 | National Monument; destroyed in 1993, re-opened in 2007 |
| Hadži Osmanija džamija (Talina) | | Banja Luka (Pobrđe) | c. 1600 | National Monument |
| Sefer-begova džamija (Pećinska) | | Banja Luka (Pećin) | c. 1600 | National Monument |
| Mir-Muhamed Mosque (Mir-Muhamedova) | | Čajniče | c. 1600 | |
| Avdića džamija, Planoj | | Bileća (Planoj) | 1617 | Destroyed in 1941 and 1992; renewed in 2013 |
| Hadži Perviz džamija (Potočka) | | Banja Luka | 1630 | National Monument; damaged in 1993, under reconstruction |
| Čelebića Mosque (Džaferovića Mosque or Šurkovića Mosque) | | Donja Bijenja, Nevesinje | 17th century | National Monument; affiliated with the Hanafi school; destroyed in 1993 during the Bosnian War; reconstructed and reopened in 2006. |
| White Mosque (Bijela džamija) | | Srebrenica | 17th century | Extensive renovation and extension work was completed in 1935; destroyed in 1995 during the Bosnian War; reconstructed and reopened in 2002 with the financial support of the Malaysian government. |
| Hadži Kurtova džamija | | Banja Luka (Lijeva Novoselija) | 1600–1700 | National Monument |
| Osman-pašina džamija | | Trebinje | 1726 | Destroyed in 1993, re-opened in 2005 |
| Sultan Ahmed Mosque | | Prijedor | 1747 | Destroyed in 1992, reopened in 2008 |
| Čaršijska Mosque | | Prijedor | 1750 | Built over site of Ottoman mosque. Destroyed in 1992, reopened in 2004 |
| Mehmed Pasha Kukavica Mosque | | Foča | 1752 | Destroyed in 1992 during the Bosnian War; National Monument; the cupola fell in 2002; in partial ruins. |
| Hadži Zulfikareva džamija (Tulekova) | | Banja Luka (Lijeva Novoselija) | 1760 | National Monument; destroyed in 1993, restored in 2007 |
| Džamija Begsuja | | Zvornik | 1776 | Damaged in 1992, restored in 2002–2004 |
| Azizija džamija | | Kostajnica | 1862 | Named after Sultan Abdul-Aziz. Destroyed in 1992, restored in 2008 |
| Prnjavor City Mosque (Gradska Džamija) | | Prnjavor | 1962 | Built over site of Ottoman mosque. Destroyed in 1992, reopened in 2004 |
| New Mosque of Bosanski Dubočac | | Derventa (Bosanski Dubočac) | after 2000 | |
| Atik Mosque | | Janja | after 2000 | |
| Mosque of Kotor Varoš | | Kotor Varoš | after 2000 | |
| New Mosque of Bosanska Dubica | | Dubica | c. 2005 | |
| Džamija Donji Križevići | | Zvornik | 2011 | Construction started in 1989, was stopped before completion due to Bosnian War, and was restarted in 1999. It was also one of the only mosques in all of Bosnia and Herzegovina to survive the whole war relatively intact (due to incompletion). |
| Hadži Šabanova džamija | | Banja Luka | | |
| Mehdi-bega Imamovića džamija | | Banja Luka | | National Monument; destroyed 1993, reconstructed 2008 |
| Salihbegovića džamija | | Bijeljina | | |
| Selimovići džamija | | Bijeljina (Selimovići) | | |
| Husein-begova džamija | | Brod | | |
| Emperor's Mosque (Sultan Bajezida Valije; Careva) | | Foča | | |
| Atik Ali Paša mosque | | Foča | | |
| Džamija Osman paše, Kazanci | | Gacko (Kazanci) | | Destroyed; sr:Задужбине Осман-паше у Казанцима |
| Džamija Hamidija, Rika | | Mrkonjić Grad | | |
| Kizlaragina Džamija | | Mrkonjić Grad | | |
| Vidorijska dzamija | | Novi Grad | | |
| Čaršijska džamija | | Novi Grad | | |
| Mahala Mosque | | Osmaci | | |
| Rogatica Mosque | | Rogatica | | |
| Mosque of Donja Strmica | | Rudo | | |
| Sultan Selim Mosque (Selimija džamija; Knežina) | | Sokolac | | National Monument; destroyed summer 1992, reconstructed 2011 (rebuilt) |
| Novoseoci Mosque | | Sokolac | | |
| Sultan Ahmedova (Careva) džamija | ] | Trebinje | | |
| Emperor's Mosque (Careva) | | Višegrad | | |
| Gazanferbegova | | Višegrad | | |
| Dobrun Mosque | | Rzav, Višegrad | | |
| Međeđa Mosque | | Višegrad | | |

== See also ==
- Islam in Bosnia and Herzegovina
- Lists of mosques
