= Veliki Park (Sarajevo) =

Park and cemetery in Sarajevo, Bosnia and Herzegovina

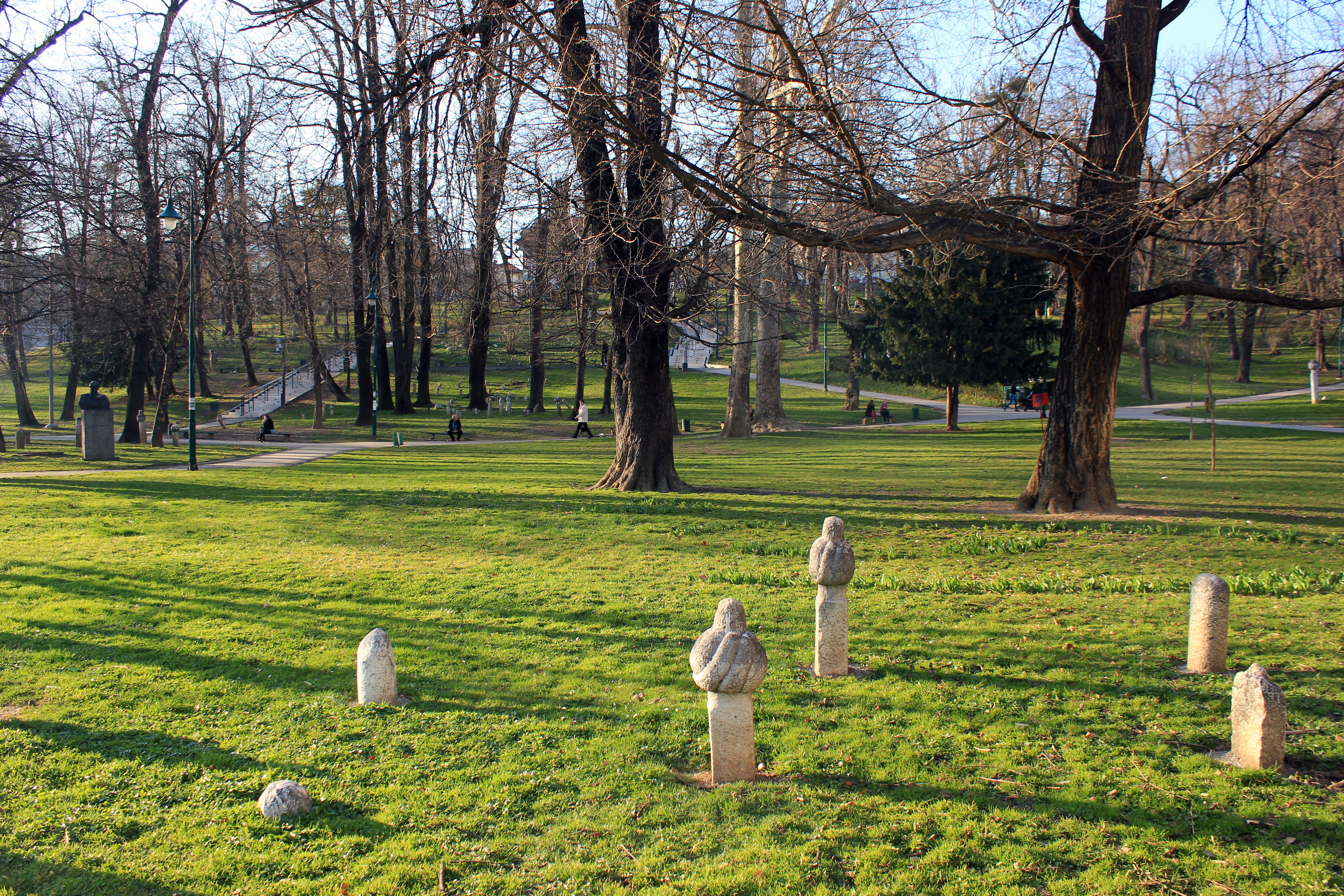
- Veliki Park in March 2017
- Interactive map of Veliki Park
- Type: Public park
- Location: Sarajevo, Bosnia and Herzegovina
- Coordinates: 43.86006°N 18.41646°E
- Created: 1888
- Operator: Municipality of Centar Sarajevo
- Status: Open year-round

Veliki Park (Bosnian: Veliki Park, meaning "Great Park") is the largest public park in central Sarajevo, Bosnia and Herzegovina. Situated in the Centar municipality, it serves as a green space.

== History ==
The area now known as Veliki Park was originally the site of the Čekrekčija cemetery, a Muslim burial ground established in the 16th century. The cemetery was founded by Mustafa Muslihudin Čekrekčija, a notable benefactor who also commissioned the construction of the Čekrekčija Mosque in 1526.

In the late 19th century, during the Austro-Hungarian administration, urban reforms led to the transformation of the cemetery into a public park. The conversion was part of broader efforts to modernize Sarajevo's urban landscape. The park was officially established in 1888, adopting the English landscape garden style.

On 22 April 1992, eight Yugoslav People's Army reservists of Serb ethnicity were summarily executed in the park by paramilitaries loyal to the government of the newly independent state of Bosnia and Herzegovina.

== Features ==
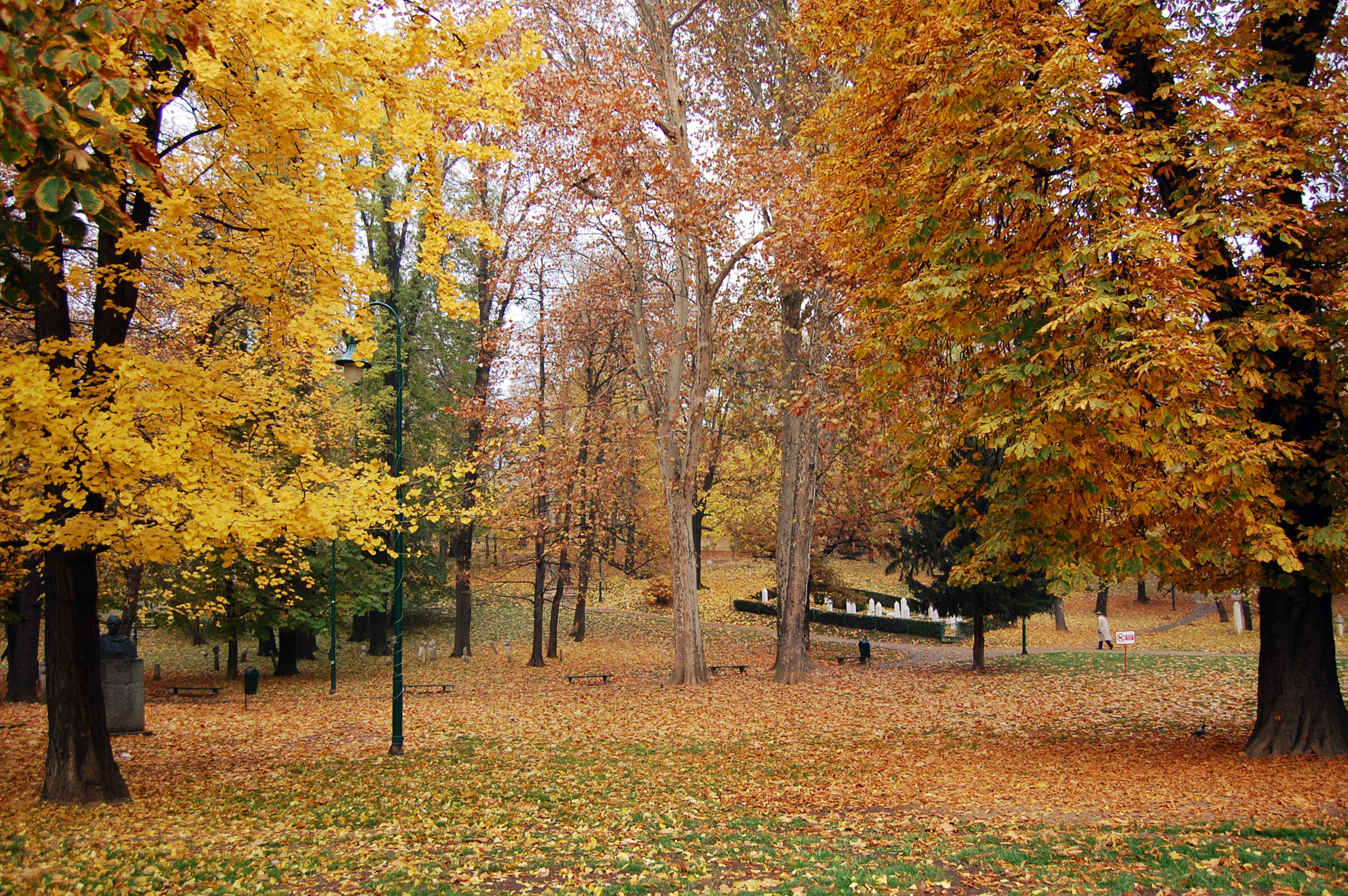
Veliki Park in autumn, 2011

Several historical elements are preserved within the park, including some of the original nišani (Ottoman-style tombstones) from the former Čekrekčija cemetery, offering a glimpse into the area's past.

Today, Veliki Park remains one of the largest green spaces in central Sarajevo, covering an area of approximately 3.3 hectares.

== Memorials ==
Veliki Park is home to significant memorials commemorating the victims of the Bosnian War:

- Memorial to the Murdered Children of Besieged Sarajevo: Unveiled in 2009, this monument honors the children who lost their lives during the siege of Sarajevo (1992–1996). Designed by sculptor Mensud Kečo, the memorial features a glass sculpture symbolizing a mother protecting her child, set within a bronze ring crafted from shell casings collected from the city.
- "Nermine, dođi" Sculpture: This poignant artwork commemorates the victims of the Srebrenica genocide, depicting the moment when a father, Ramo Osmanović, called out for his son, Nermin, before both were executed.
