= Čobanija Mosque =

Mosque in Sarajevo, Bosnia and Herzegovina

- Džamija Čobanija
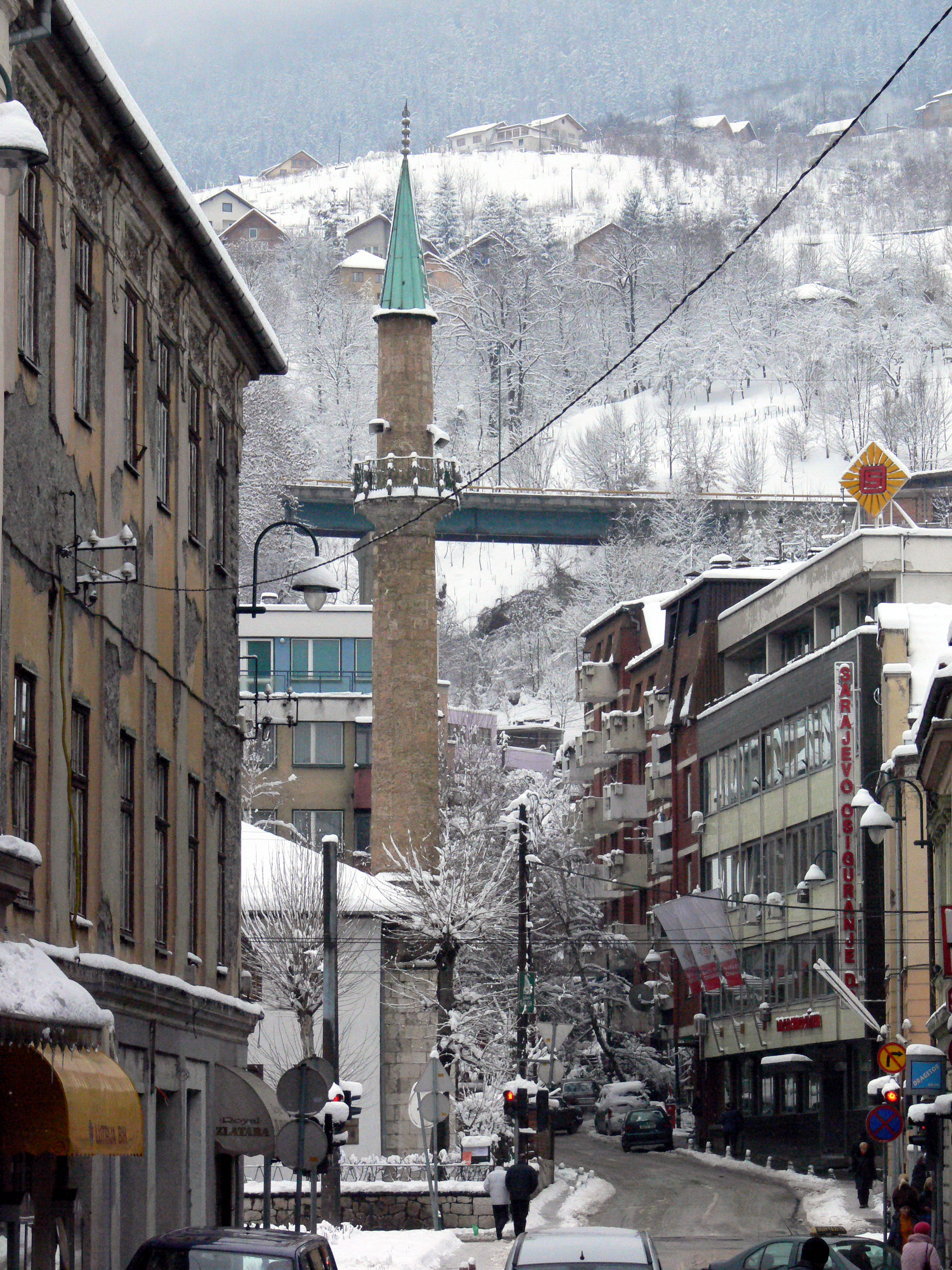

- Location of the former mosque in Sarajevo

Religion
- Affiliation: Islam
- Ecclesiastical or organizational status: Mosque
- Status: Active

Location
- Location: Sarajevo
- Country: Bosnia and Herzegovina
- Interactive map of Čobanija Mosque
- Coordinates: 43°51′19″N 18°25′15″E

Architecture
- Type: mosque
- Style: Ottoman
- Founder: Čoban-Hasan
- Completed: before 1565 CE

Specifications
- Dome: 1
- Minaret: 1

The Čobanija Mosque (Bosnian: Džamija Čobanija) is a mosque located in Sarajevo, Bosnia and Herzegovina. Constructed before 1565, the spacious mosque has a stone minaret that is inscribed with a poem in Turkish. There is a cemetery adjacent to the mosque, which some believe is the final resting place of the benefactor, Čoban-Hasan.

In 2007, a proposal was adopted for the mosque to be listed as a national monument of Bosnia and Herzegovina.

== See also ==
- Islam in Bosnia and Herzegovina
- List of mosques in Bosnia and Herzegovina
