= Hadžijska Mosque =

Mosque in Sarajevo, Bosnia and Herzegovina

- Vekil-Harač ili Hadžijska džamija
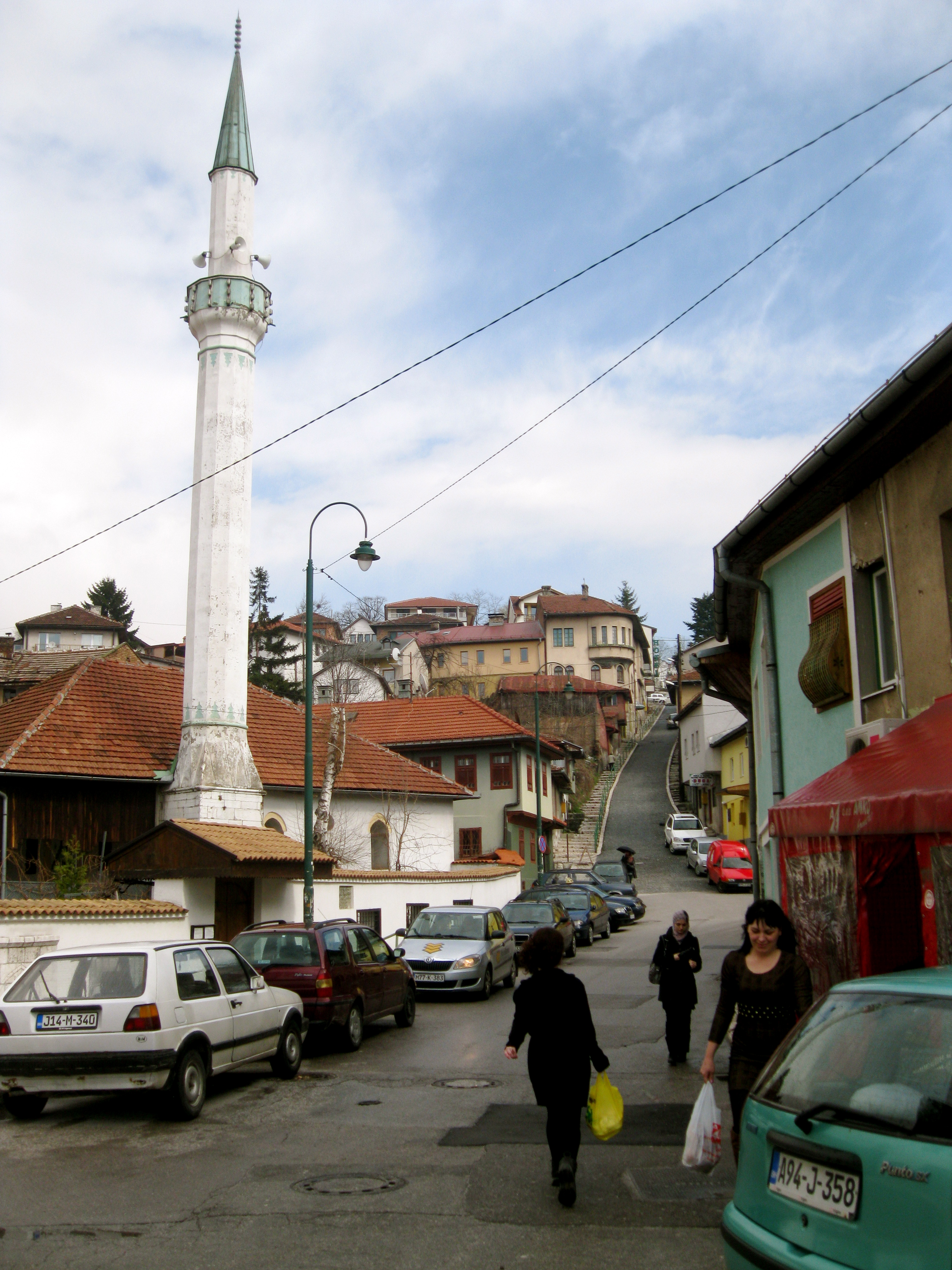

- Location of the mosque in Sarajevo

Religion
- Affiliation: Sunni Islam
- Ecclesiastical or organizational status: Mosque
- Status: Active

Location
- Location: Centar, Sarajevo
- Country: Bosnia and Herzegovina
- Interactive map of Hadžijska Mosque
- Coordinates: 43°51′31″N 18°26′03″E

Architecture
- Type: Mosque
- Style: Ottoman
- Founder: Vekil Harč Mustafa
- Funded by: Vekil Harč; Mehmed Šakir ef. Mujidović; Hajži Mustajbeg Bešlija
- Completed: 1561

Specifications
- Length: 12 m (39 ft)
- Width: 12 m (39 ft)
- Dome: 1
- Minaret: 1
- Materials: Stone; adobe; wood

The Hadžijska Mosque, also called the Vekil-Harrach Mosque or the Vekil-Harrach Hadžijska Mosque (Bosnian: Vekil-Harač ili Hadžijska džamija), is a mosque in the city of Sarajevo, Bosnia and Herzegovina. It is located in Alifakovac, a neighbourhood in Babića Bašća local community, one of the oldest urban settlements in Centar, Sarajevo.

== History ==
The mosque was built between 1541 and 1561 by Gazi Husrev-beg's quartermaster, Vekil-Harrach after whom it was originally named. It was used by pilgrims (hadžije) in the city before their journey to Mecca from here; it was named the Pilgrim's mosque.

The mosque was built at the same time as the Mahallah, between 1540 and 1545. The Vekil-Harč mosque, as it was known, is a single-space mosque with an open porch, hipped roof and stone minaret. It was built of stone, adobe, and wood, and is among the more beautiful and spacious mosques with dimensions of 12 by 12 metres (39 by 39 ft). It got its name because in front of this mosque, according to custom, Sarajevo hajjis were seen off, who would first perform namaz (prayer) at the mosque. After that, the hajjis would go to Mecca via Alifakovac and Kozja ćuprija for the hajj (pilgrimage).

In addition to Vekil Harč Mustafa, this mosque had several benefactors. In 1846, a resident of this mahala, the Sarajevo mufti Mehmed Šakir ef. Mujidović, bequeathed a shop with a storehouse to the mosque. Hajži Mustajbeg Bešlija (-1799), a wealthy Sarajevo merchant, built a mekteb and a bakery next to the mosque, which were destroyed after World War I. Near the mosque there used to be the Džumišića medresa, known as the Drvenija medresa, because of the wooden bridge that was located in front of the mosque. During the campaign of Eugene of Savoy against Sarajevo in October 1697, the mosque was burned down, but the residents of the Mahallah soon repaired it.

In 1800, the kadi Mustafa Fejzi ef. Mostar built a stone fountain to the left of the entrance door of the mosque. On the slab above the fountain is carved an inscription in the Nastaliq script. The preserved inscription has the form of a poem written in Turkish:

"The owner of this property is the son of Mostar's Hamdi-effendi, a muderis, Mustafa-Fejzi, a kadi in the town of Binfše, who renovated this fountain.
Those who drink the water like the water of Kevser (a spring in paradise) will say:
May the Almighty accept this good deed.
Hashim arrived and pronounced the chronogram to her:
The benefactor has earned paradise Firdevs. 1215 AH (1800/1801 CE)."

In 1938, Hadži Hasan-aga Neziragic ordered the renovation of the mosque. On that occasion, in addition to replacing the sofas and musandera, the wooden roof structure was changed, and the ceramic tile covering was replaced with red tiles. During the Bosnian War (1992-1995), the roof of the mosque was destroyed. Later, the roof structure was partially repaired and the damaged tile covering was replaced. The current roof of the mosque is high, hipped, with a steep slope, with a wooden roof structure and a red tile covering. It was built in 1938 when Hadži Hasan-aga Neziragić ordered the restoration of the mosque. The sofas and musandera were replaced, and the broken and damaged nišan tombstones in the mosque's harem were repaired. There is an inscription above the entrance to the mosque about this renovation.

The last major renovation took place in 1959, when the existing courtyard wall was replaced with a new wall. Next to the mosque is a cemetery with 51 nišan tombstones, 23 of which have inscriptions. The oldest nišan dates from 1731, and the newest from 1873. The founder of the mosque, Vekil Harč Mustafa, is buried in this cemetery, as well as the Morić brothers (Hajji Mehmed Morić and Ibrahimaga Morić), leaders of the ten-year rebellion against Ottoman rule who were executed in 1757 in Sarajevo.

There are plans to reinstall the old roof plan.

The mosque is fenced by a wall, inside which is a stone fountain, which was renewed at the beginning of the 19th century by Sarajevo judge (kadija) Mustafa Fevzi, which is what the inscription is about.

== Gallery ==
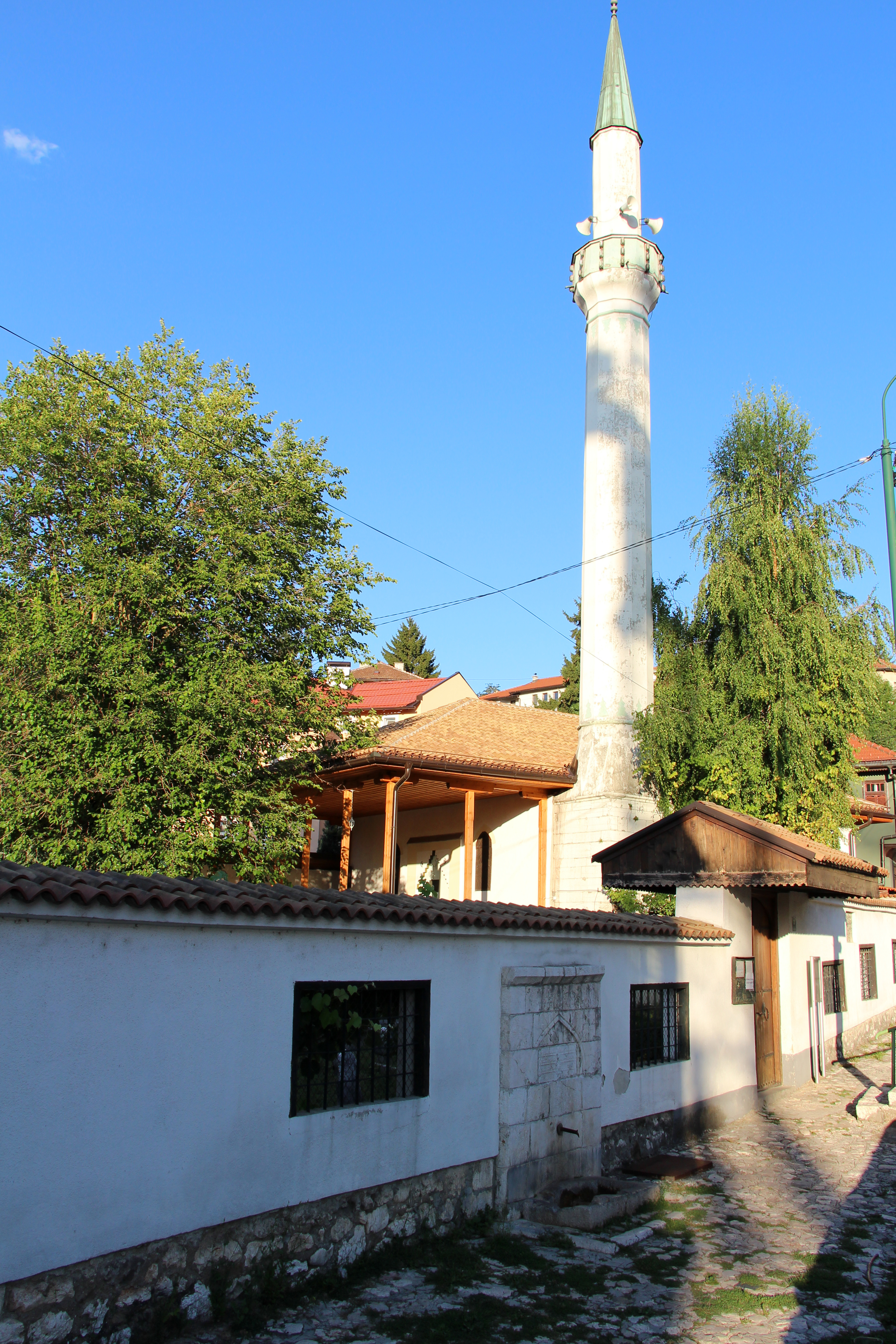
Vekil Harčova (Hadžijska) džamija

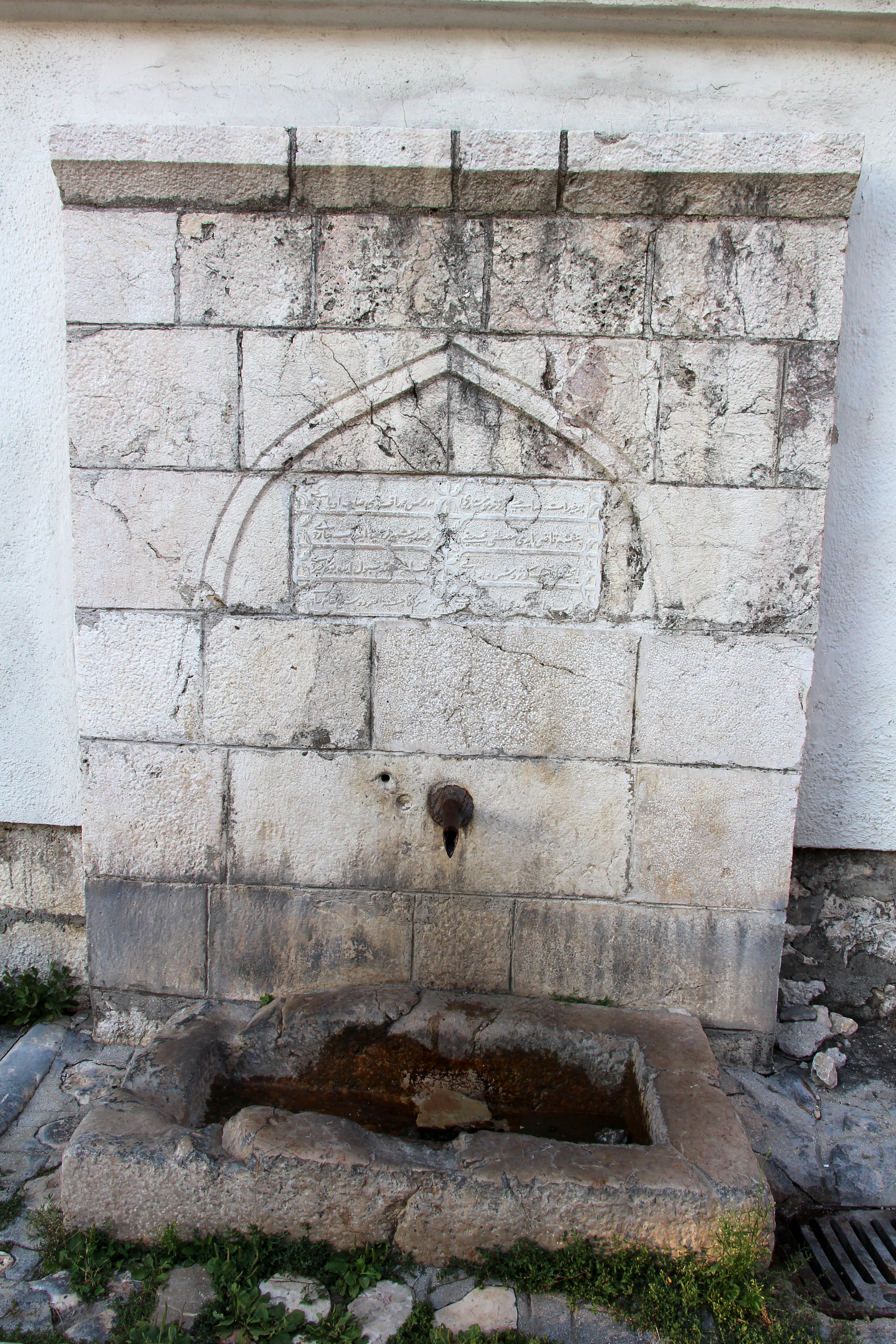
Fountain next to the mosque

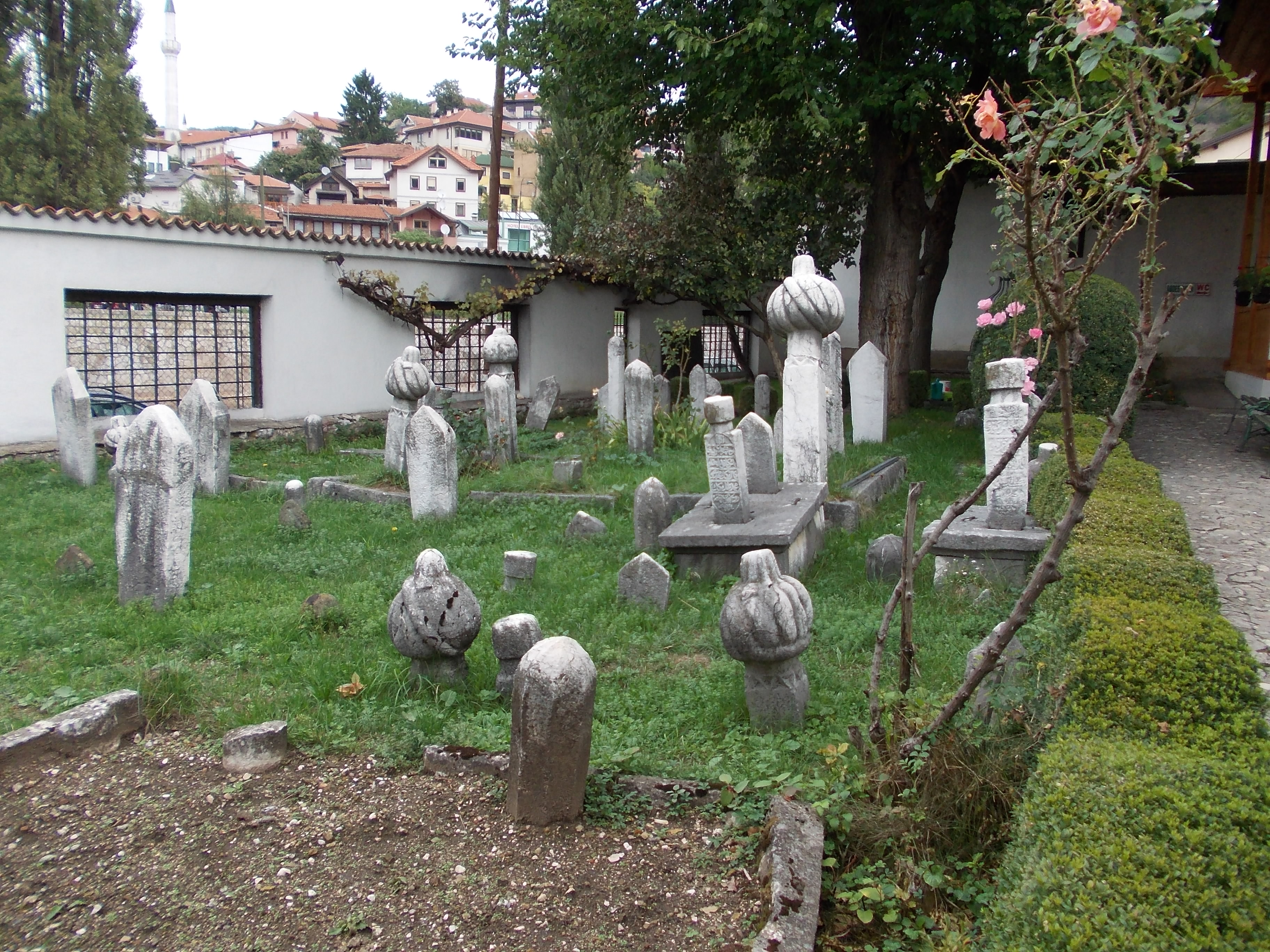
Cemetery next to the mosque

== See also ==
- Islam in Bosnia and Herzegovina
- List of mosques in Bosnia and Herzegovina
