= Karađoz Bey Mosque =

Mosque in Mostar, Bosnia and Herzegovina

- Karađoz-begova džamija
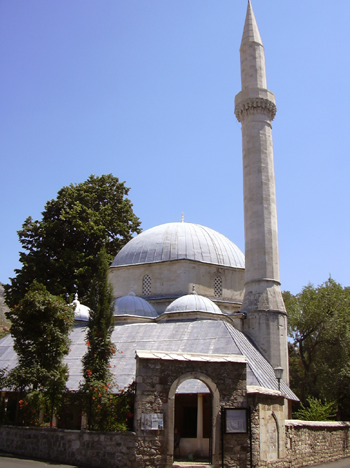

- Location of the mosque in Bosnia and Herzegovina

Religion
- Affiliation: Sunni Islam
- Ecclesiastical or organisational status: Mosque: (1558–c. 1992); (since 2004– )
- Status: Active

Location
- Location: Mostar, Federation of Bosnia and Herzegovina
- Country: Bosnia and Herzegovina
- Interactive map of Karađoz Bey Mosque
- Coordinates: 43°20′28″N 17°48′50″E

Architecture
- Architect: Mimar Sinan
- Type: Mosque
- Style: Ottoman
- Completed: 965 AH (1557/1558 CE) (original); 2004 (rebuilt)
- Destroyed: c. 1992 (during the Bosnian War)

Specifications
- Length: 13 m (43 ft)
- Width: 13 m (43 ft)
- Dome: 1
- Dome height (outer): 16.49 m (54.1 ft)
- Dome height (inner): 15.89 m (52.1 ft)
- Dome dia. (outer): 10.72 m (35.2 ft)
- Minaret: 1
- Minaret height: 34.50 m (113.2 ft)
- Materials: Stone

KONS of Bosnia and Herzegovina
- Official name: Karađoz-beg mosque in Mostar, the architectural ensemble
- Type: Category I cultural monument
- Criteria: A. B. C. i. iii. iv. v. vi. D. ii..iii. iv. v. E. i..ii. iii..iv. v. F. i..ii. iii. G. i. ii..iii. iv..v..vi. vii. H.i..ii. iii. I. i. ii. iii.
- Designated: 4 May 2004
- Reference no.: 2424
- Decision no.: 07.1-2-113/04-1
- Listed: List of National Monuments of Bosnia and Herzegovina

The Karađoz Bey Mosque (Bosnian: Karađoz-begova džamija; Turkish: Karagöz Mehmed Bey Camii) is a Sunni mosque, located in the city of Mostar, Bosnia and Herzegovina. Completed in 965 AH (1557/1558 CE) during the Ottoman era, the mosque was destroyed in the early 1990s during the Bosnian War, and rebuilt in 2004.

With its large dome and 34.5-metre-tall (113 ft) minaret, it is one of the largest mosques in the region.

== History ==
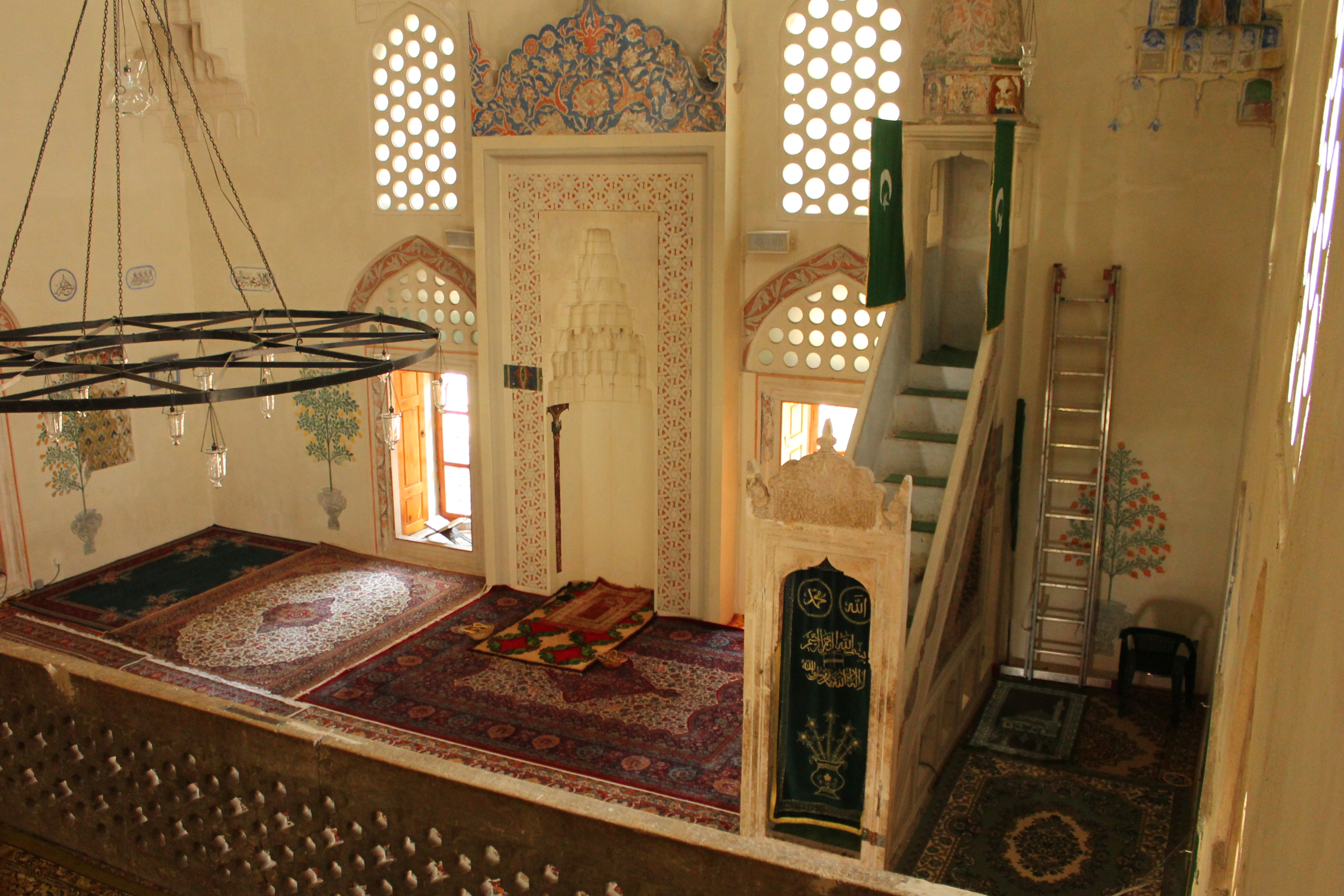
Interior of the mosque

An Arabic foundation inscription on the mosque records that it was commissioned by Mehmed Beg b. Abu al-Saʿadat’ who was a brother of a vizier in 965 AH (1557/1558 CE). Some scholars have claimed that the vizier was the Ottoman grand vizier Rustem Pasha, but Rustem Pasha is recorded as having only one brother, Sinan Pasha.

The mosque may have been designed by the imperial architect Mimar Sinan. It is in the form of a domed cube fronted by a double portico. The three domes of the inner portico are supported by four marble columns. The outer portico has a shed roof resting on small octagonal pillars. The large 10.65 metres (34.9 ft) dome of the mosque sits on an octagonal fenestrated drum which is supported by eight-pointed arches.

The mosque was severely damaged during World War II, and faced near destruction during the Bosnian War in the early 1990s. However, the Karađoz Bey Mosque, like the rest of Mostar, underwent extensive repairs between 2002 and 2004. The mosque was completely renovated and reopened to the public in July 2004.

== See also ==
- Islam in Bosnia and Herzegovina
- List of mosques in Bosnia and Herzegovina
- List of National Monuments of Bosnia and Herzegovina
