= Hajji Ahmed the Ducat Minter's Mosque =

Mosque in Livno, Bosnia and Herzegovina

- Džamija Hadži Ahmeta Dukatara
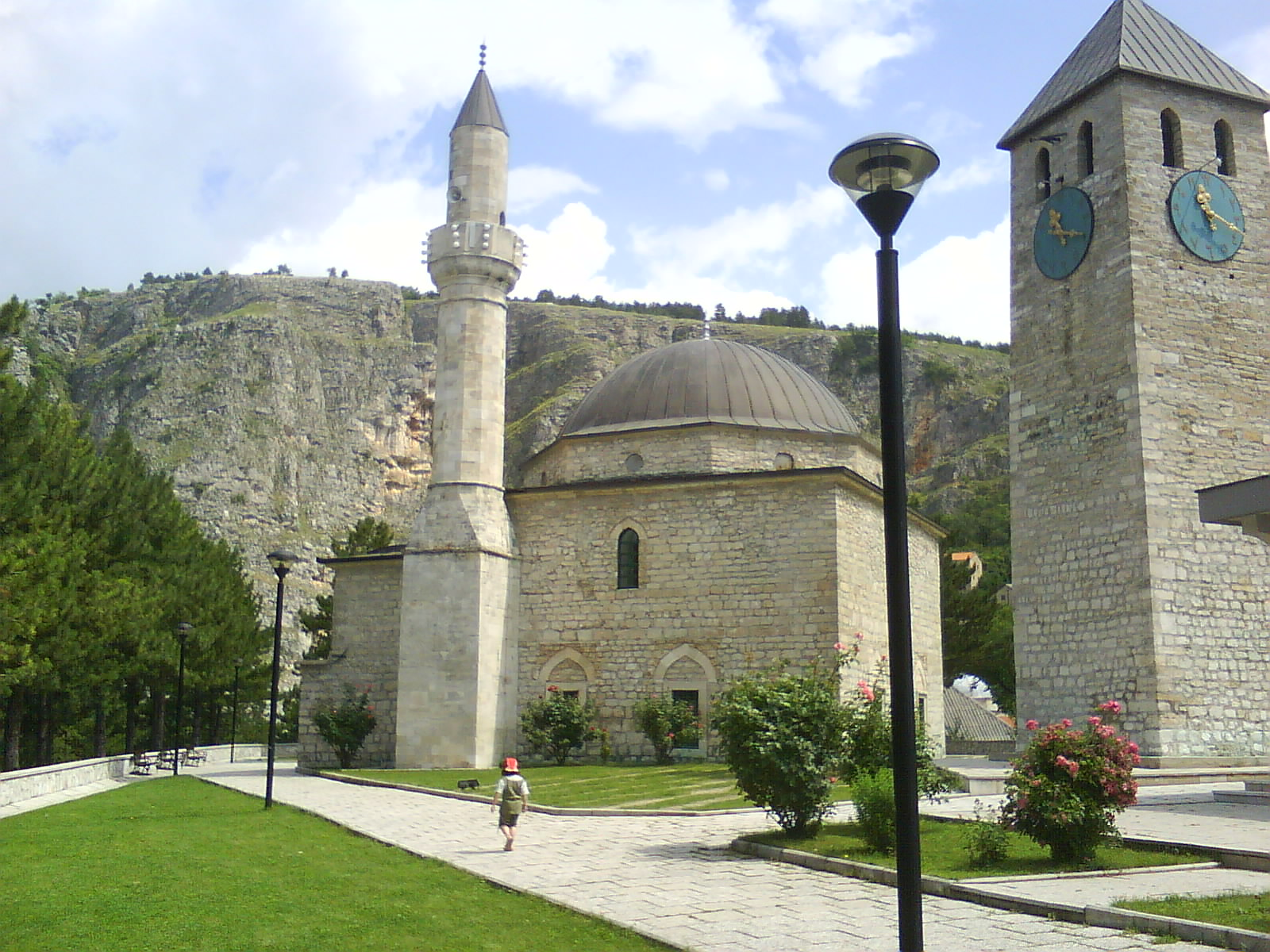
- The mosque (left) and clock tower (right). Note the Eastern numerals on the clock face

- Location of the mosque in Bosnia and Herzegovina

Religion
- Affiliation: Sunni Islam
- Ecclesiastical or organizational status: Mosque
- Status: Active

Location
- Location: Livno
- Country: Bosnia and Herzegovina
- Interactive map of Hajji Ahmed the Ducat Minter's Mosque
- Coordinates: 43°50′00″N 17°00′00″E

Architecture
- Architect: Mimar Sinan
- Type: Mosque
- Style: Ottoman
- Completed: 1574 CE

Specifications
- Dome: 1
- Minaret: 1 (plus clock tower)

The Hajji Ahmed the Ducat Minter's Mosque (Bosnian: Džamija Hadži Ahmeta Dukatara) is a mosque complex located in Livno, Bosnia and Herzegovina. Completed in 1574 CE, during the Ottoman era, the mosque complex is more commonly known as the Glavica (lit. 'Head Mosque'), called after the knap above town on which is erected. It is one of the most recognizable architectural symbols of Livno and is a National Monument of Bosnia and Herzegovina.

== Overview ==
Built in 1574 (some date to 1587), it is situated on a hill overlooking old town of Livno, the river Bistrica, and the spring Duman, in the upper section of the old town.

The mosque complex consists of compact main building of the mosque under a dome and uncharacteristically short minaret, with a clock tower which was erected some 100 years later, between 1670 and 1680, but more likely in 1659. The clock tower and mosque are in current use. Within the perimeter of the mosque complex is a 500-year-old necropolis with characteristic early Bosnian Muslim tombstones and more recent tombstones.

On 25 April 2022, the mosque hosted an iftar (breaking of the Ramadan fast) attended by Turkish Parliament Speaker Mustafa Şentop during his two-day official visit to Bosnia and Herzegovina.

== See also ==
- Islam in Bosnia and Herzegovina
- List of mosques in Bosnia and Herzegovina
- Livanjsko Polje
