= Prnjavor City Mosque =

Mosque in Prnjavor, Bosnia and Herzegovina

- Gradska džamija u Prnjavoru
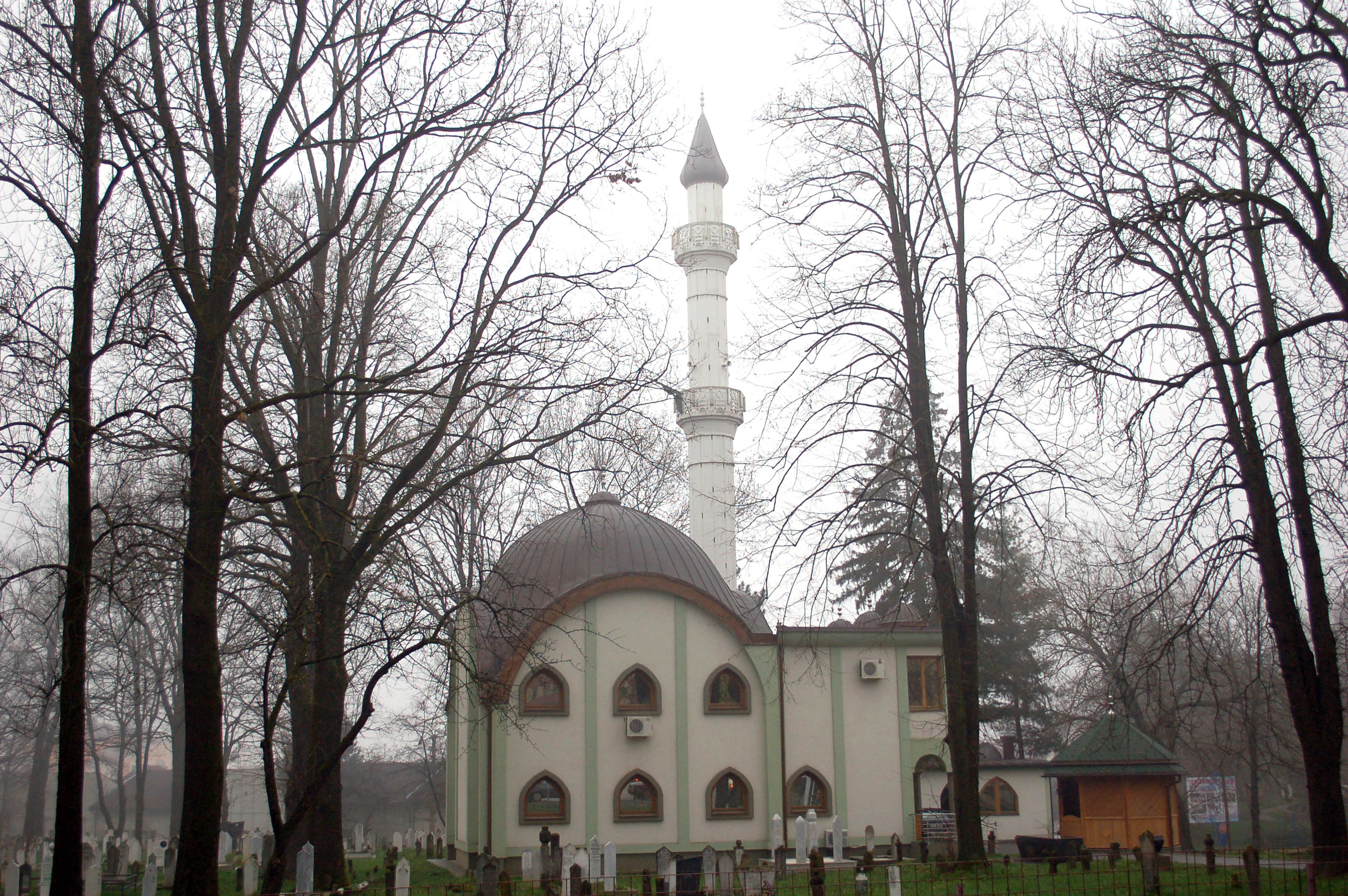

Religion
- Affiliation: Islam
- Status: active

Location
- Location: Prnjavor, Bosnia and Herzegovina
- Interactive map of Prnjavor City Mosque

The Prnjavor City Mosque (Bosnian: Gradska džamija Prnjavor) is located in the center of the city of Prnjavor, Bosnia and Herzegovina.

== The Mosque's Harem ==
Applying the Criteria for Making Decisions on Proclaiming a Property as a national monument, The commission decided to declare the mosque's harem a national monument.
