= Hadži Hasan Mosque =

Mosque in Tuzla, Bosnia and Herzegovina

- Hadži Hasanova džamija
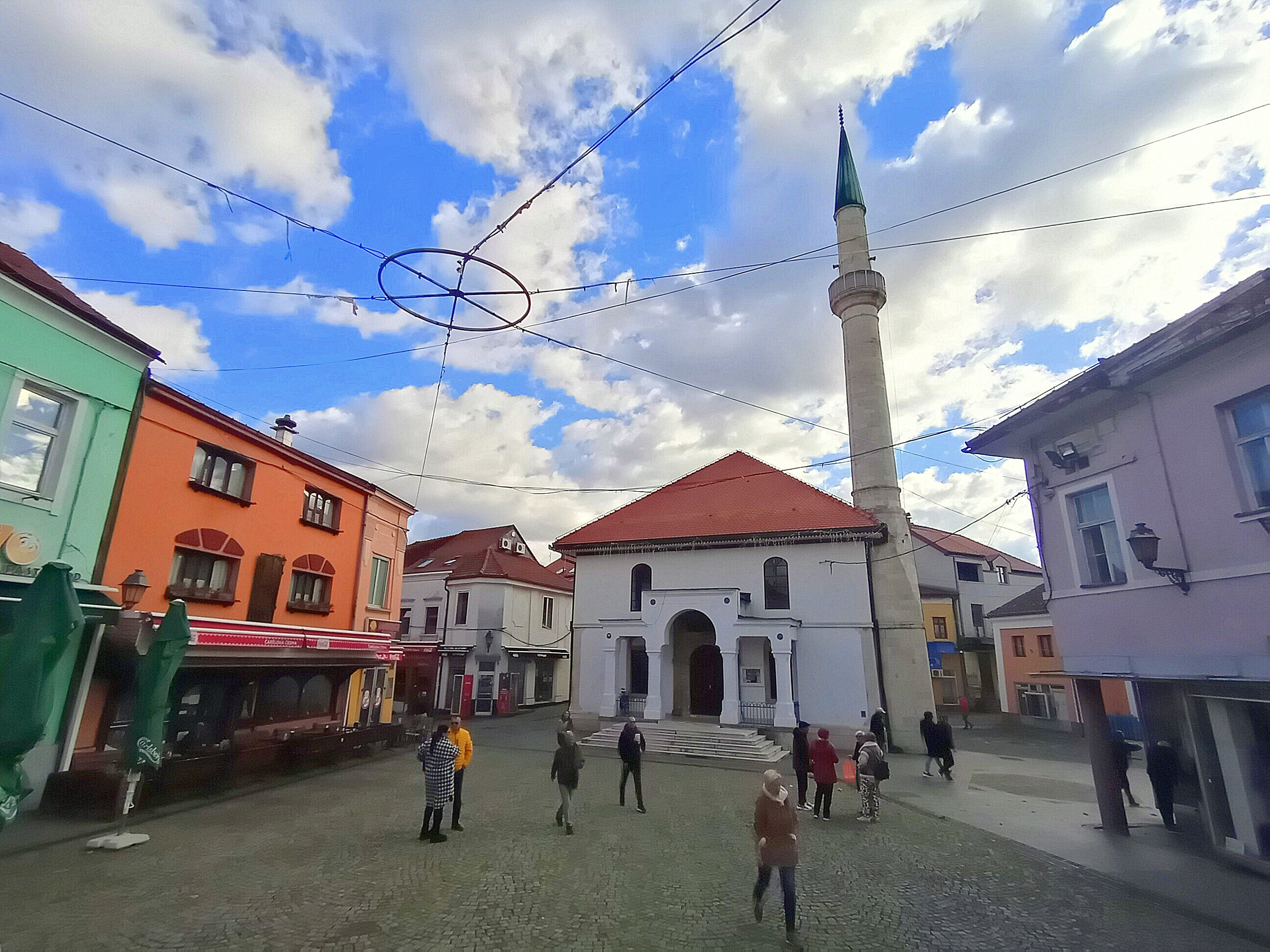

- Location of the mosque in Bosnia and Herzegovina

Religion
- Affiliation: Islam
- Ecclesiastical or organisational status: Mosque
- Status: Active

Location
- Location: Tuzla, Tuzla Canton, Federation of Bosnia and Herzegovina
- Country: Bosnia and Herzegovina
- Interactive map of Hadži Hasan Mosque
- Coordinates: 44°32′19″N 18°40′32″E

Architecture
- Type: Mosque
- Style: Ottoman
- Completed: 1548 CE
- Minaret: 1

The Hadži Hasan Mosque (Bosnian: Hadži Hasanova džamija) is a mosque in Tuzla in Bosnia and Herzegovina. Completed in 1548 CE, during the Ottoman era, the mosque was the largest and main mosque of Tuzla until the late 1990s and the construction of new mosques.

== History ==
The Hadži Hasan Mosque in Tuzla has been renovated multiple times. After a fire in 1871, there was a significant reconstruction completed during 1873-1874 under Zvornik's governor, Mustafa Pasha. At the time, the building experienced the most extensive renovations in its history. In April 1997, Bosnia and Herzegovina's Institute for the Protection of Cultural, Historical, and Natural Heritage assessed the mosque's condition and proposed restoration measures, revealing that the structure was built on a clay layer.

== See also ==
- Islam in Bosnia and Herzegovina
- List of mosques in Bosnia and Herzegovina
- Church of the Dormition of the Theotokos, Tuzla
