= Baitus Salam Mosque, Sarajevo =

Mosque in Sarajevo, Bosnia and Herzegovina

Baitus Salam Mosque
- Location of the mosque in Sarajevo

Religion
- Affiliation: Ahmadiyya Islam
- Ecclesiastical or organizational status: Mosque
- Status: Active

Location
- Location: Sarajevo
- Country: Bosnia and Herzegovina
- Interactive map of Baitus Salam Mosque
- Coordinates: 43°51′13″N 18°21′49″E

Architecture
- Type: Mosque
- Completed: 2004

Website
- www.ahmadija.ba

The Baitus Salam Mosque (House of Peace) is a mosque in Sarajevo, in Bosnia and Herzegovina, run by the Ahmadiyya Muslim Community (AMJ).

== See also ==
- Islam in Bosnia and Herzegovina
- List of mosques in Bosnia and Herzegovina
