= Mosque of Atik Behram Bey =

Mosque in Tuzla, Bosina and Herzegovina

- Atik Behram-begova džamija
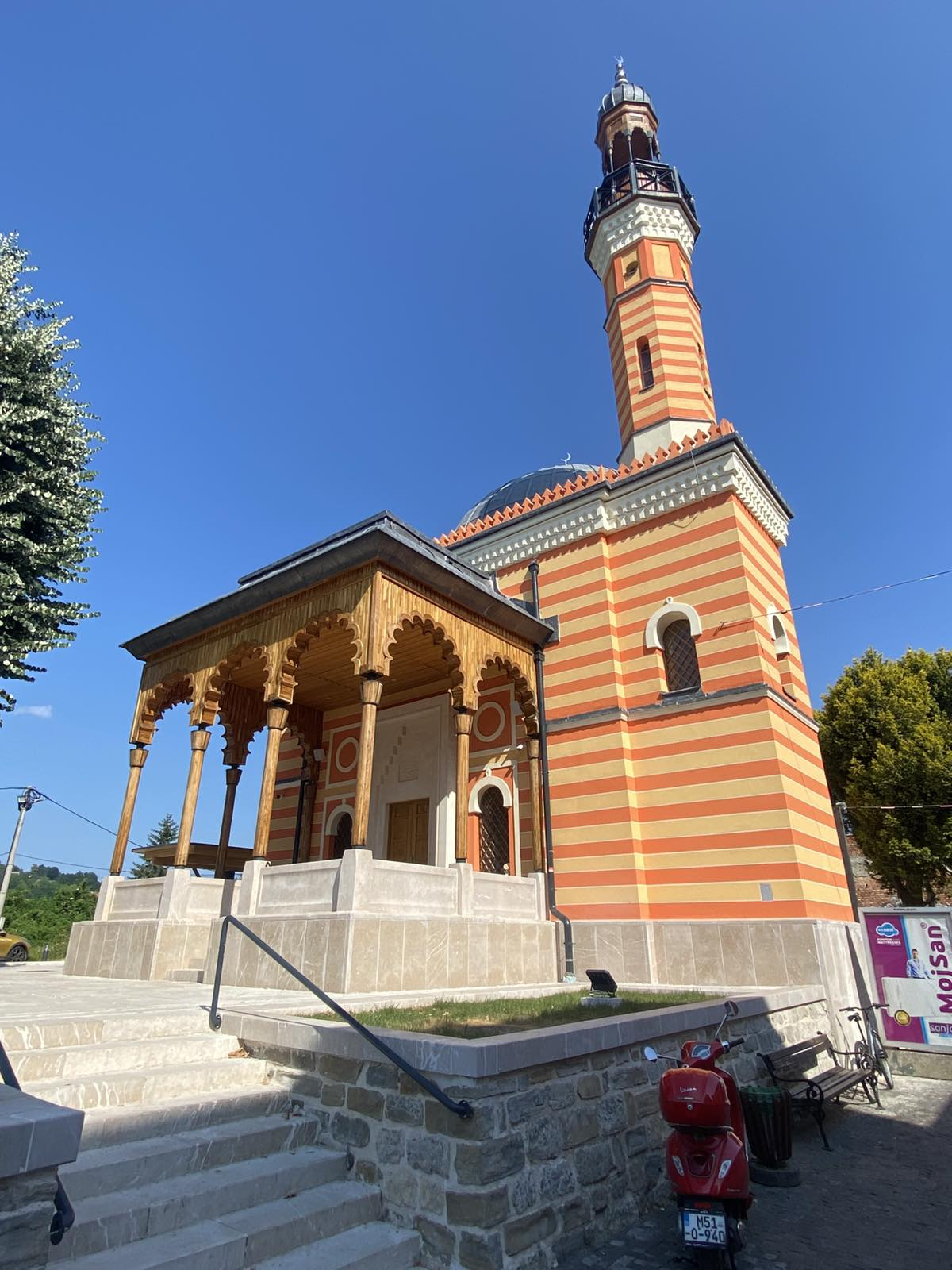

- Location of the mosque in Bosnia and Herzegovina

Religion
- Affiliation: Sunni Islam
- Ecclesiastical or organisational status: Mosque
- Status: Active

Location
- Location: Tuzla, Tuzla Canton, Federation of Bosnia and Herzegovina
- Country: Bosnia and Herzegovina
- Interactive map of Mosque of Atik Behram Bey
- Coordinates: 44°32′24″N 18°40′25″E

Architecture
- Type: Mosque

Specifications
- Dome: 1
- Minaret: 1

The Mosque of Atik Behram Bey (Bosnian: Atik Behram-begova džamija), better known as the Colourful Mosque (Šarena džamija), is the oldest mosque in Tuzla, Bosnia and Herzegovina.

== Name ==
The name of Atik was given to this mosque because it is probably the oldest mosque in Tuzla. It also acquired the name of Behram Bey due to the Behram-begova medresa being placed in front of it, and because the mosque was probably renewed and maintained as part of the same waqf (vakif). It draws the name, the Colorful Mosque, due to the decorated interiors.

== Architecture ==
The mosque was built on a small hill, and is 10 by 10 metres (33 by 33 ft) square and dominates the environment. Before the fire of 1871, it was built of clay, with a wooden cupola. After its rebuilding in 1888, it had a dome of solid materials, that was quickly replaced by a tile roof. On the ground floor there are ten windows made of iron with cross bars. The interior of the mosque is decorated with various furniture. The minbar is built in Arabic style. The minaret consists of several parts, so it is squared from the base to the top of the mosque wall with a narrow roof on three sides. The mosque, as well as the harem itself, is secured by a rock-wall support wall with a concrete slab.

== Gallery ==
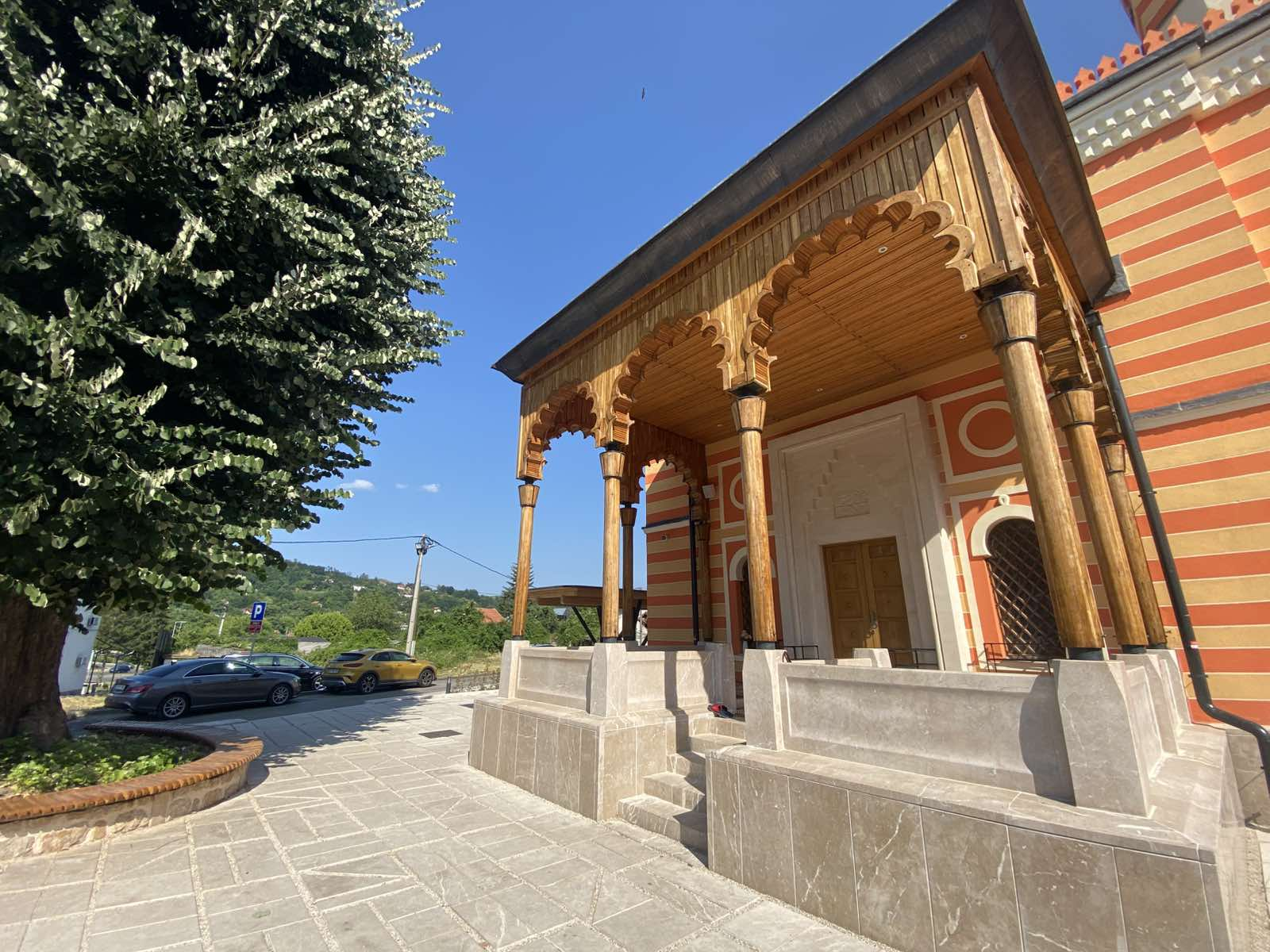
Entrance

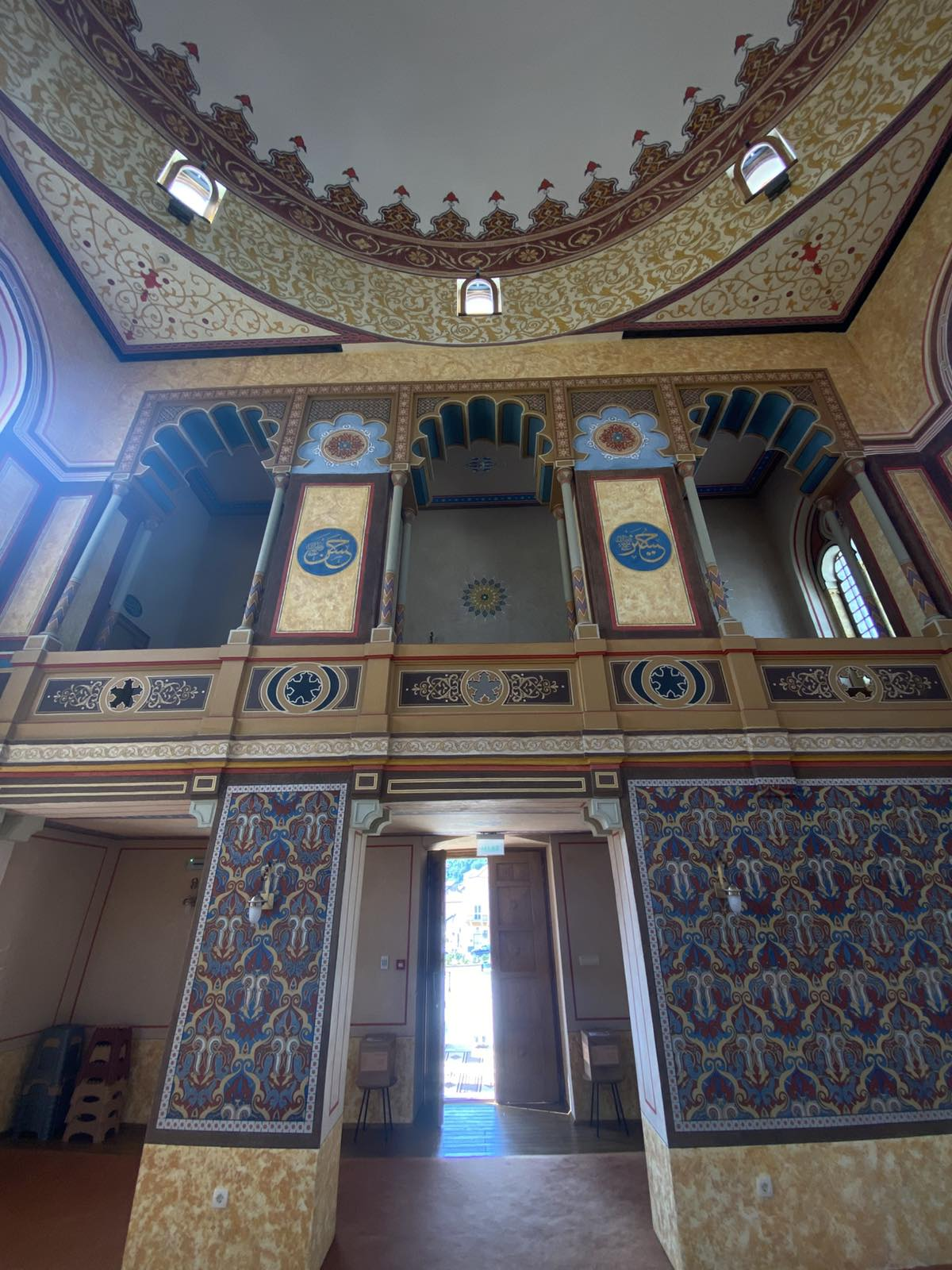
Interior

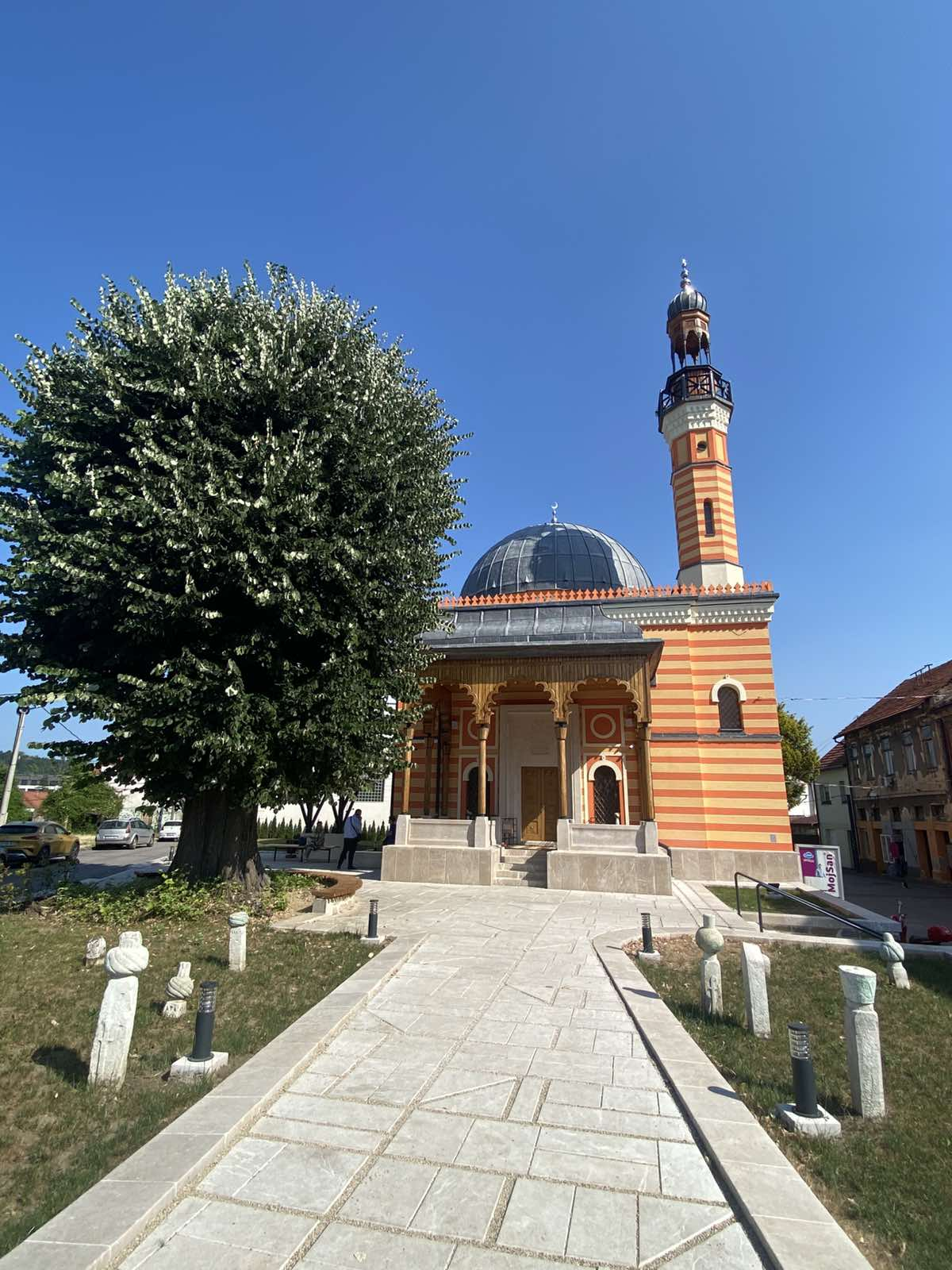
Harem of mosque

== See also ==
- Islam in Bosnia and Herzegovina
- List of mosques in Bosnia and Herzegovina
