= Arnaudija Mosque =

Mosque in Banja Luka, Bosnia and Herzegovina

- Arnaudija džamija
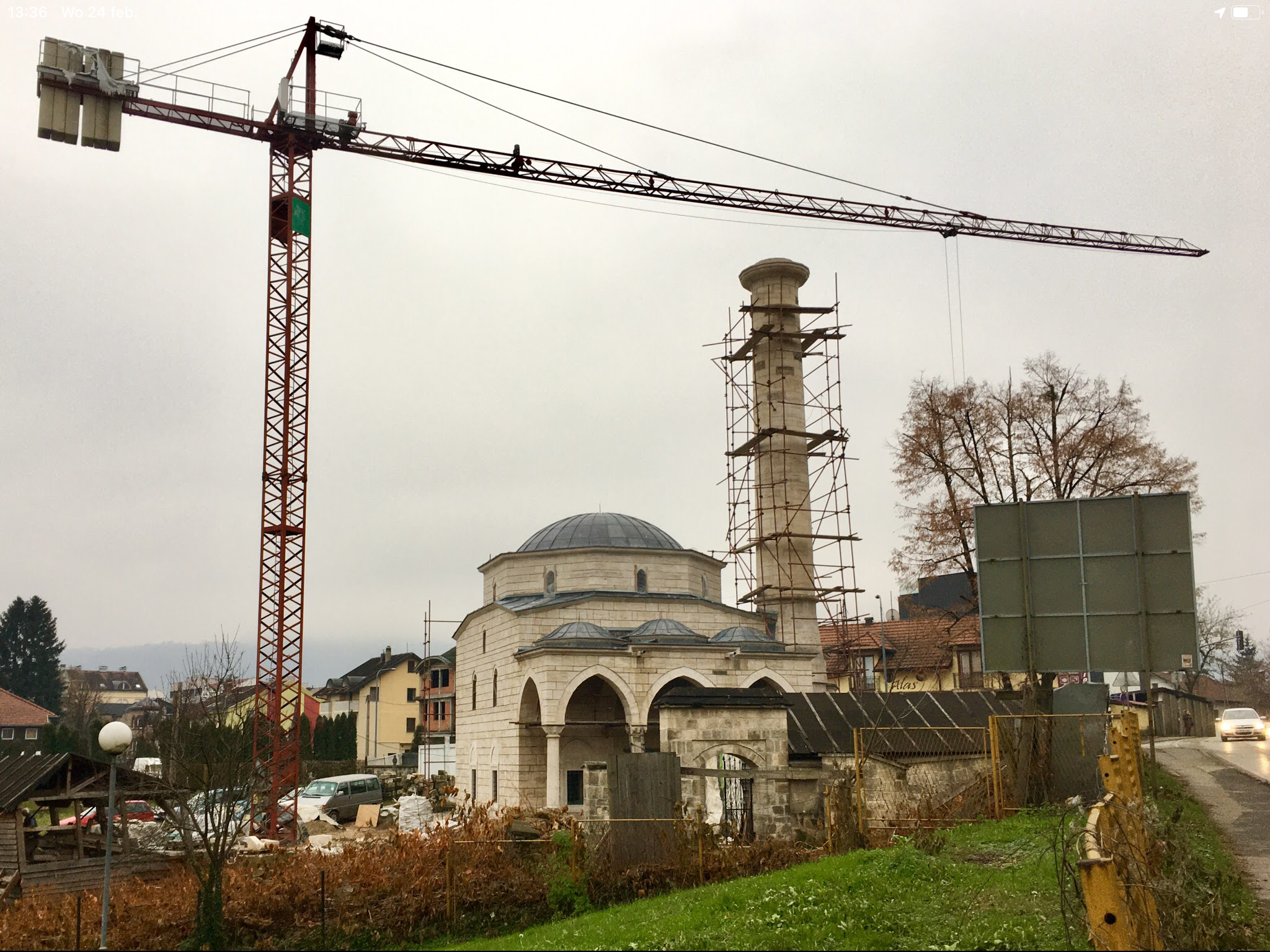
- The mosque during its reconstruction, in 2021

- Location of the mosque in Bosnia and Herzegovina

Religion
- Affiliation: Sunni Islam
- Ecclesiastical or organizational status: Mosque: (1595–1993); (2024–present)
- Status: Active

Location
- Location: Banja Luka, Republic of Srpska
- Country: Bosnia and Herzegovina
- Interactive map of Arnaudija Mosque
- Coordinates: 44°46′11.8″N 17°10′54.4″E

Architecture
- Type: Mosque
- Completed: 1595 (original); 2024 (rebuild)
- Destroyed: May 7, 1993 (during the Bosnian War)

Specifications
- Dome: 1
- Minaret: 1

KONS of Bosnia and Herzegovina
- Official name: Arnaudija Mosque
- Type: National Monument
- Designated: 7 July 2003

The Arnaudija Mosque (Bosnian: Arnaudija džamija) is a large mosque in Banja Luka, Bosnia and Herzegovina. The mosque was destroyed by the Army of Republika Srpska in 1993 but was rebuilt and reopened in 2024. In 2003, the Arnaudija Mosque was designated as a National Monument by the Commission to Preserve National Monuments of Bosnia and Herzegovina.

== History ==
The mosque was built in 1595 under Hasan Defterdar, finance minister of the Eyalet of Bosnia.

The mosque was demolished by explosives on May 7, 1993, by the Serb militia during the Bosnian War. The demolition was organized by the authorities of the Republika Srpska which included the demolition of the entire Arnaudija Mosque complex and Ferhadija Mosque complex that were approximately 800 metres (2,600 ft) from each other. Both mosques were destroyed on the same night within 15 minutes of each other.

One of the Serbs leaders from Banja Luka, Radoslav Brđanin was convicted for his part in organizing the ethnic cleansing of the non-Serbs and destruction of the properties of Muslims, including mosques. Radoslav Brđanin was sentenced to a single sentence of 32 years of imprisonment.

The reconstruction of Arnaudija Mosque started in April 2017 and the mosque was officially reopened in May 2024.

== See also ==
- Islam in Bosnia and Herzegovina
- List of mosques in Bosnia and Herzegovina
- List of National Monuments of Bosnia and Herzegovina
