= Mehmed Pasha Kukavica Mosque =

Former mosque in Bosnia and Herzegovina

- džamija Mehmed-paše Kukavice
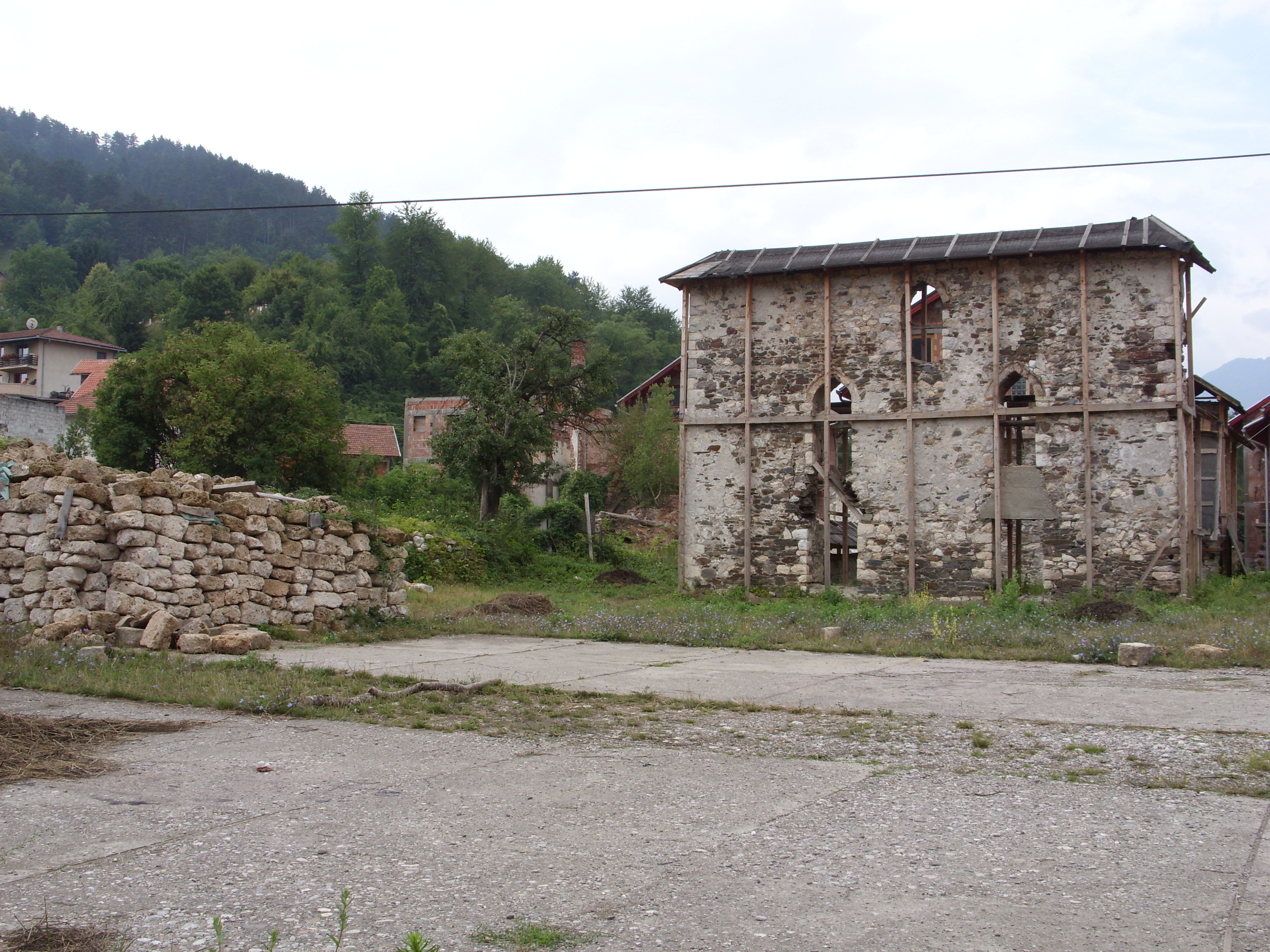
- The ruins of the former mosque, in 2008

- Location of the former mosque in Bosnia and Herzegovina

Religion
- Affiliation: Sunni Islam (former)
- Ecclesiastical or organisational status: Mosque (1752–1992)
- Status: Destroyed (in partial ruins)

Location
- Location: Foča, Republika Srpska
- Country: Bosnia and Herzegovina
- Interactive map of Mehmed Pasha Kukavica Mosque
- Coordinates: 43°30′18.2″N 18°46′29.9″E

Architecture
- Type: Mosque
- Style: Ottoman
- Completed: 1752
- Destroyed: 1992

KONS of Bosnia and Herzegovina
- Official name: The architectural ensemble of the mosque and medresa of Mehmed-paša Kukavica in Foča
- Type: Category I cultural monument
- Listed: List of National Monuments of Bosnia and Herzegovina

The Mehmed Pasha Kukavica Mosque (Bosnian: džamija Mehmed-paše Kukavice) is a former mosque, in partial ruins, located in the town of Foča, in the Republika Srpska political division of Bosnia and Herzegovina. Completed in 1752, during the Ottoman era, the mosque was destroyed in 1992, during the Bosnian War.

== Overview ==
It was one of five mosques in Foča which typologically belonged to a single-space domed mosque with an open exterior portico. It was located in Gornja (Upper) čaršija (Foča's old town), and was completely destroyed during the Bosnian War, with partial ruins extant. Built in 1751, it was a part of an architectural ensemble consisting of the mosque, madrasa (completed in 1758), clock tower and hammam (bathhouse), all endowments of Foča-born Mehmed-paša Kukavica, one of the most prominent Ottoman governors of Bosnia.

The mosque and the rest of the architectural ensemble, as well as most of the old town of Foča (Ottoman architecture of Prijeka čaršija) was demolished in 1992 on the orders of the authorities of Republika Srpska, immediately after the attack and ethnic cleansing of its Muslim inhabitants.

The architectural ensemble of the mosque, medresa, clock tower and hammam of Mehmed-paša Kukavica in Foča are designated as a National Monument of Bosnia and Herzegovina by the Commission to Preserve National Monuments of Bosnia and Herzegovina.

== See also ==
- Islam in Bosnia and Herzegovina
- List of mosques in Bosnia and Herzegovina
- List of National Monuments of Bosnia and Herzegovina
