= Gornji Šeher =

Town in Bosnia and Herzegovina

Srpske Toplice Srpske Toplice / Ilidža
- Historic town & spa resort / spa town
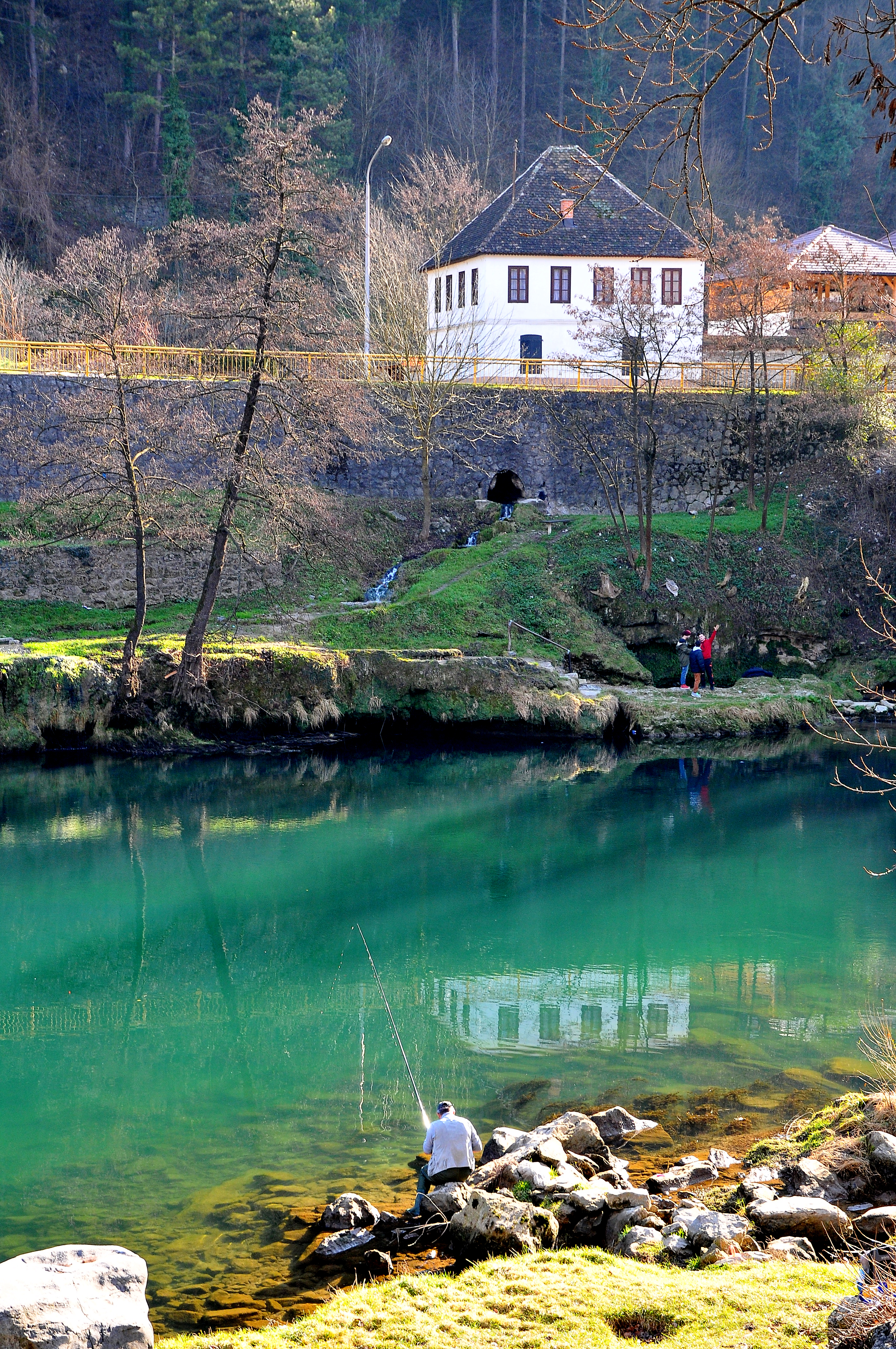
- Interactive map of Srpske Toplice
- Location within Bosnia and Herzegovina
- Coordinates: 44°45′03″N 17°09′29″E
- Country: Bosnia and Herzegovina
- Municipality: Banja Luka
- Town: Srpske Toplice

Dimensions
  - Length: 1.5 km (0.93 mi)
  - Width: 0.5 km (0.31 mi)

Srpske Toplice, Gornji Šeher (transl. Upper Šeher) before the 1990s, is a local community and a spa town in the area of Banja Luka, Bosnia and Herzegovina. It is located on the banks of the Vrbas River in the southern part of the city's territory. There are eight springs of thermal water in the heart of Gornji Šeher, with a temperature of up to 32 °C. Gornji Šeher is designated National Monument of Bosnia and Herzegovina by KONS.

== History ==
Next to the thermal springs, a spa settlement was created in Roman times. It was located on the right bank of Vrbas, while the road connecting Split (Latin: Spalatum) with Gradiška (Latin: Servitium), i.e. the Roman provinces of Dalmatia and Pannonia, passed by it on the left bank.

The Ottomans conquered Banja Luka in 1521. The Ottomans established proper settlement here. Around 1580, Ferhat Pasha Sokolović built a bazaar a few kilometers downstream, on the left bank of Vrbas (surroundings of today's Kastel), and in 1583 he transferred the seat of the Bosnian pashaluk there. Since then, Banja Luka had two šehers (towns), Upper and Lower.

== Geography ==
It is located south of Banja Luka, approximately 4 kilometers from the city center.

== Education ==
The "Branislav Nušić" Elementary School is located in the settlement. The School was built during the Ottoman control and went by a different name.

== Population ==
According to the 1991 population census, the local community of Gornji Šeher had 4,920 inhabitants with the following national composition:

- Bosniak – 3.115
- Srb – 1.235
- Croat – 56
- Yugoslav – 361
- the rest, undecided and unknown – 153.

== Gallery ==
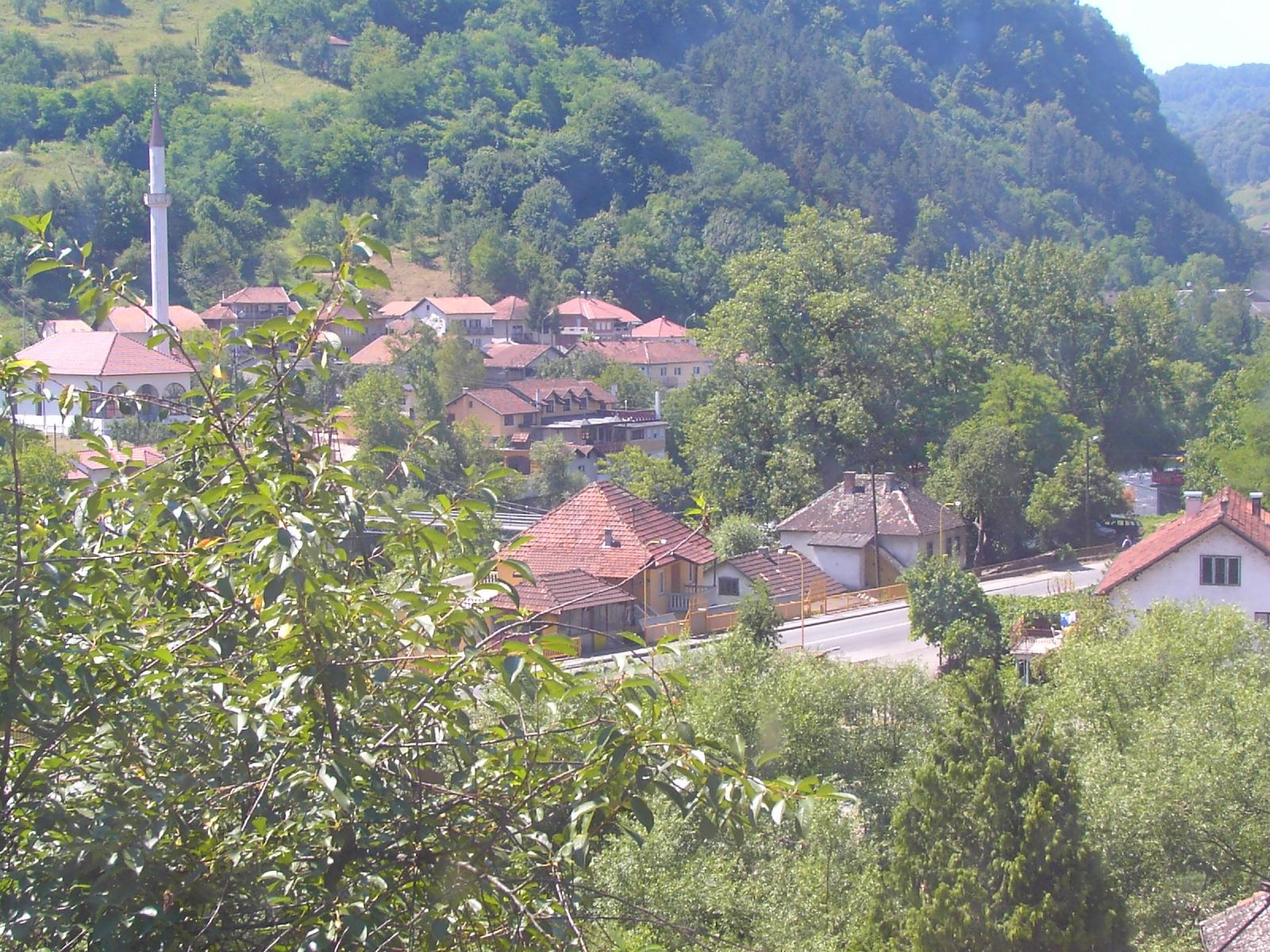
View on Gornji Šeher

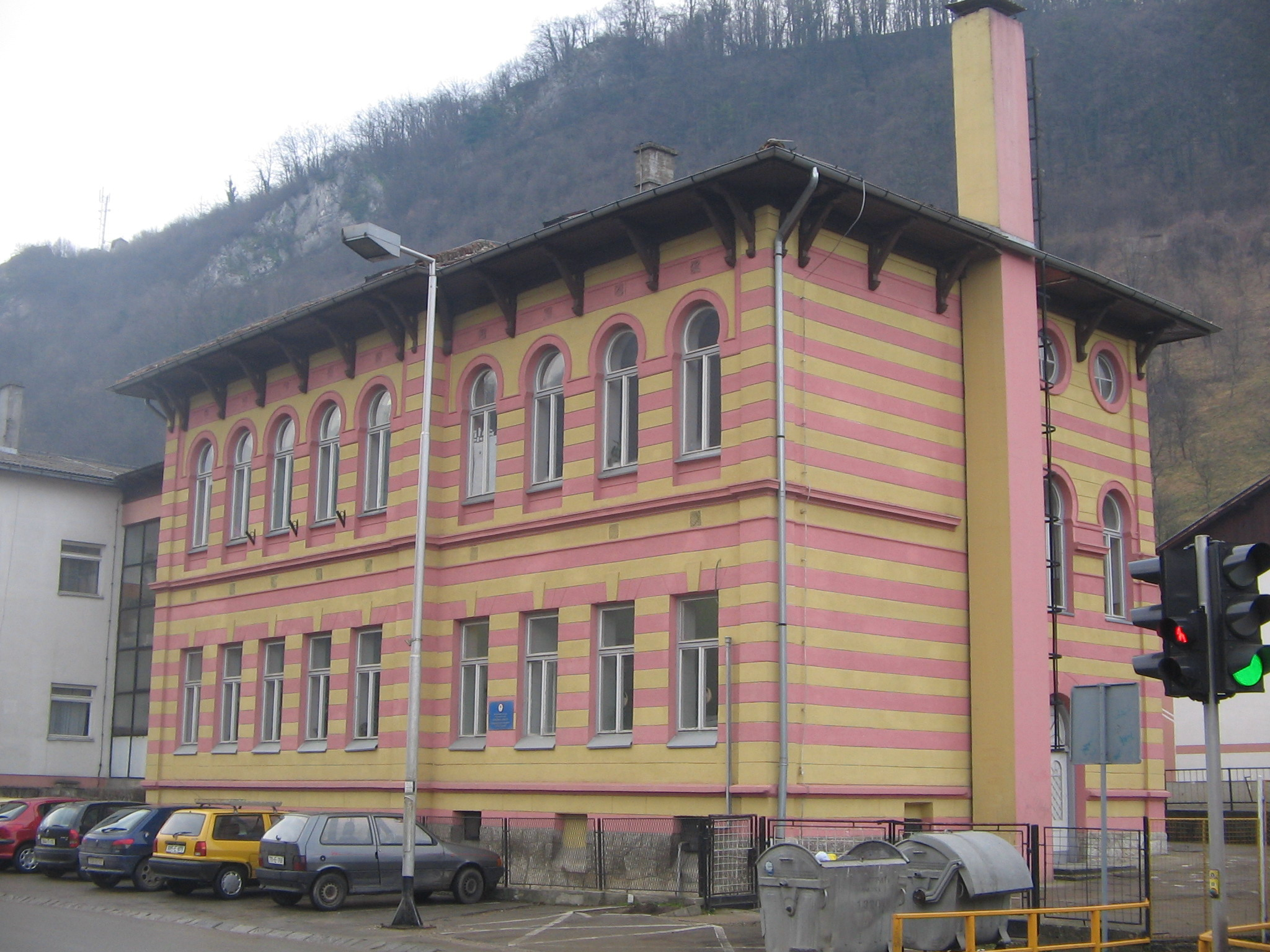
Elementary School "Branislav Nušić"

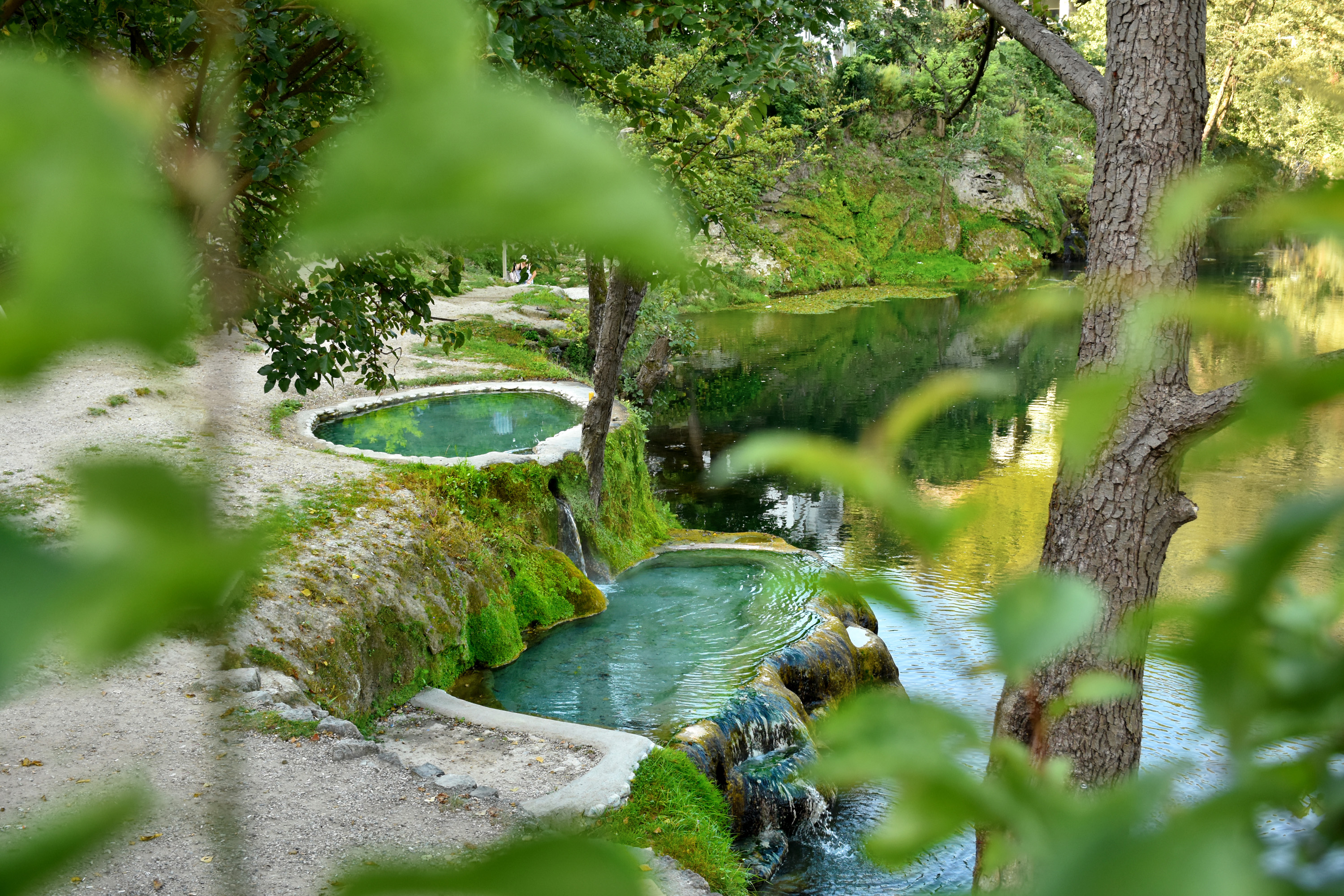
Baths in hot springs in Gornji Šeher

== Bibliography ==
- 'Amir Osmančević (1995). Banjaluka - vrijeme nestajanja [Banja Luka Time of Vanishing]. Zagreb: Katalog Knjižnica grada Zagreba -.
