= Muslihudin Čekrekčija Mosque =

Mosque in Sarajevo, Bosnia and Herzegovina

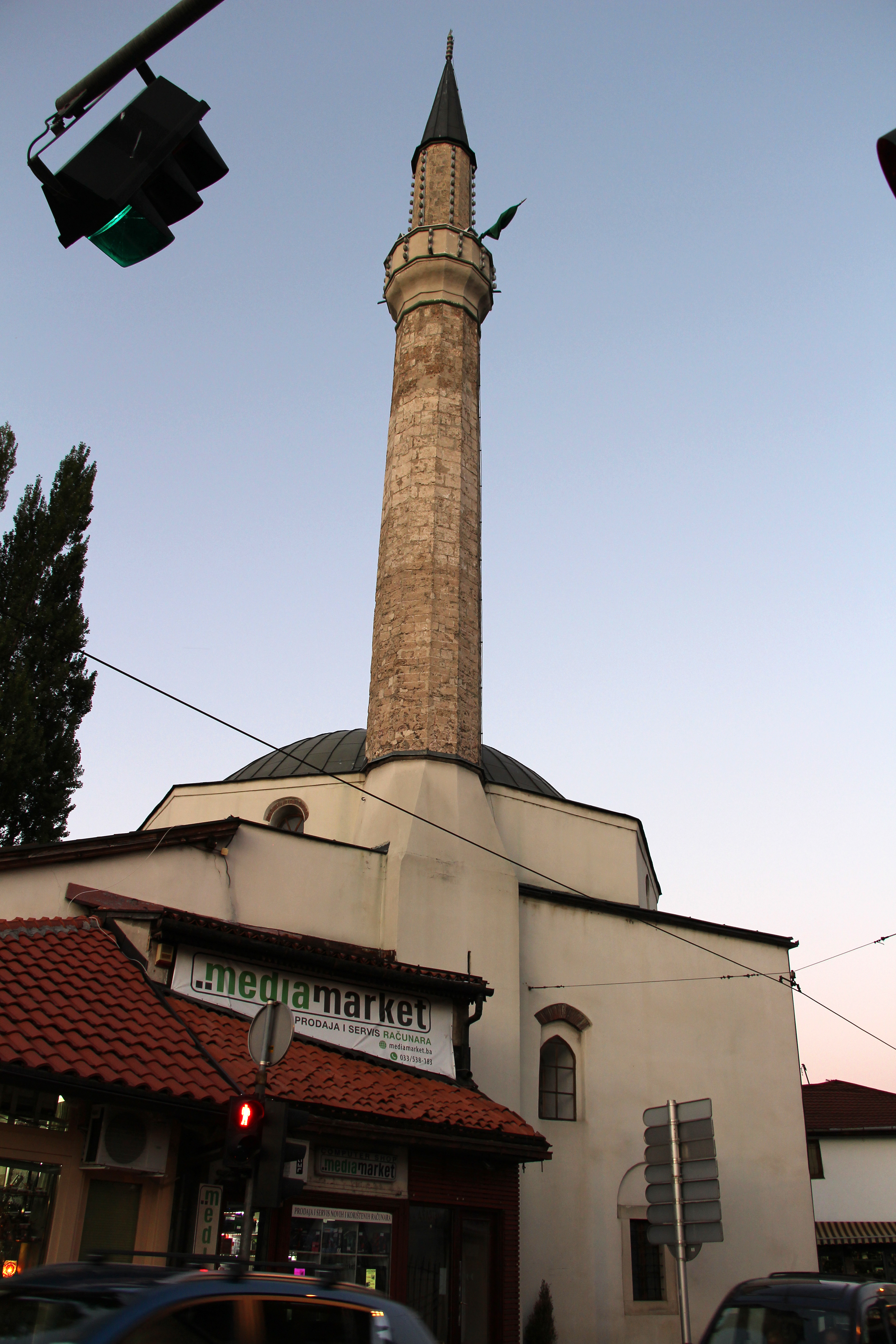

- Location of the mosque in Sarajevo

Religion
- Affiliation: Sunni Islam
- Ecclesiastical or organizational status: Mosque
- Status: Active

Location
- Location: Baščaršija, Sarajevo
- Country: Bosnia and Herzegovina
- Interactive map of Muslihudin Čekrekčija Mosque
- Coordinates: 43°51′36″N 18°25′55″E

Architecture
- Type: mosque
- Style: Ottoman
- Founder: Muslihudin Čekrekčija
- Completed: 1526

Specifications
- Length: 17.9 m (59 ft)
- Width: 17.54 m (57.5 ft)
- Dome: 1
- Minaret: 1
- Minaret height: 32 m (105 ft)
- Materials: Stone (limestone, sedra), Turkish brick (pavements), wood, wrought iron, lead and copper sheet

KONS of Bosnia and Herzegovina
- Official name: Muslihudin Čekrekčija Mosque
- Designated: November 2004
- Decision no.: 06.2-2-213/04-10
- Listed: List of National Monuments of Bosnia and Herzegovina

The Muslihudin Čekrekčija Mosque, also known as Čaršijska, is a mosque located in the Baščaršija area of Sarajevo, in Bosnia and Herzegovina. Constructed in 1526, it is the second oldest domed in the city, situated at the foot of Kovač (in the city's old trading centre).

== History ==
The mosque was built in the mahala of Isa-Bey's era. From the vakufnam of the founder of the mosque, Hajji Mustafa, the son of Ishak, is known to the people as Muslihudin Čekrekčija, her builder. This is also the oldest known original document written in Sarajevo.

In the vakufnam, in connection with the establishment and construction of the mosque, it was written:

When a man dies, his work comes to an end, except for three things: the knowledge and skills he used, the good child who prays for him, and his enduring sadaqa [good deeds].

— translated by Mehmed Handžić.

In November 2004 the mosque was listed as a National Monument of Bosnia and Herzegovina.

Today its links to its commercial past remain, as it is surrounded by shops.

== See also ==
- Islam in Bosnia and Herzegovina
- List of mosques in Bosnia and Herzegovina
