= Sultan Selim Mosque (Knežina) =

Mosque in Bosnia and Herzegovina

Sultan Selim I(I) Mosque
- Ferhat-pašina džamija
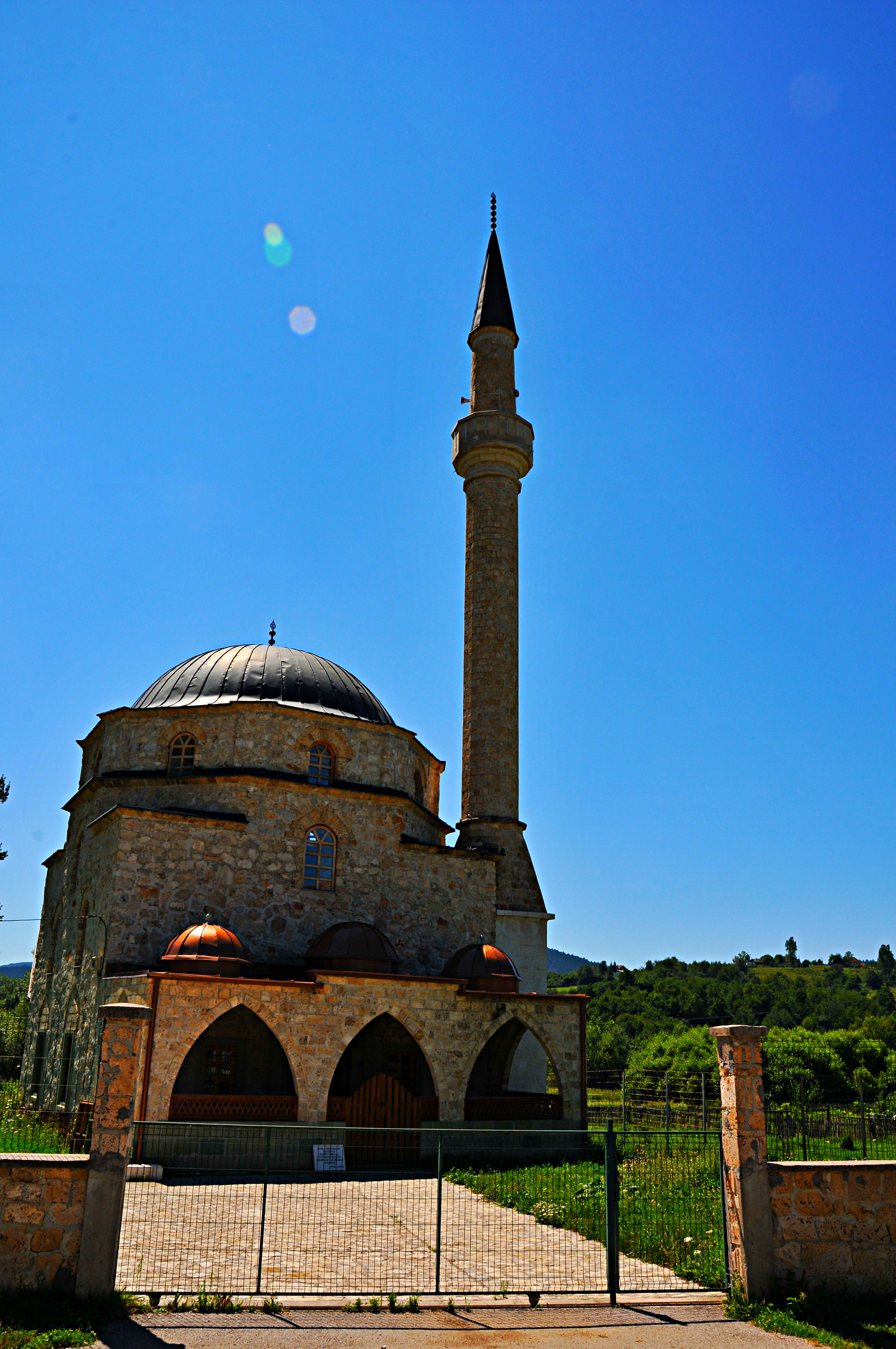

- Location of the mosque in Bosnia and Herzegovina

Religion
- Affiliation: Sunni Islam
- Ecclesiastical or organisational status: Mosque
- Status: Active

Location
- Location: Knežina, Sokolac, Municipality of Sokolac
- Country: Bosnia and Herzegovina
- Interactive map of Sultan Selim I(I) Mosque
- Coordinates: 44.019680°N 18.758665°E

Architecture
- Type: Mosque
- Style: Ottoman
- Founder: Sultan Selim I or II
- Completed: 1540 (original); 2011 (rebuilt)
- Destroyed: summer 1992 (during the Bosnian War)

Specifications
- Dome: 1
- Minaret: 1
- Materials: stone

KONS of Bosnia and Herzegovina
- Official name: "Selimija (Sultan Selim II) mosque in Knežina near Sokolac, the site and remains of the historic building (2429)".
- Type: Category I cultural monument
- Criteria: II. Value; A, B, C i.ii.v.vi., D i.ii.iii.iv.v., E ii.iii.iv.v., F i.ii.iii., G i.ii.iii.iv., H ii.
- Designated: 4 May 2004
- Reference no.: 2429
- Decision no.: 06.2-2-55/04-6
- Listed: List of National Monuments of Bosnia and Herzegovina

Sultan Selim II Mosque in Knežina or Selimiye Mosque, sometimes referred to as Emperor's Mosque (Sultan Selima džamija; Selimija džamija; Careva džamija) is the 16th century mosque located in the settlement of Knežina, Sokolac municipality, Bosnia and Herzegovina.

At the beginning of the Bosnian War, in the summer of 1992, the mosque was demolished with explosives by local Serbian authorities and militia. It was completely rebuilt from the same material and officially opened on September 4, 2011.

The mosque site and material remain were declared National Monument of Bosnia and Herzegovina by KONS on May 4, 2004.

== Historija ==
The Selimiye Mosque was built during the reign of Selim II (1566–1574) or during the reign of Selim I (1512–1520).

Andrej Andrejević, who studying monumental Islamic art of the 16th century in the former Yugoslavia, established that the type of single-space domed mosque, created in the Beylikdüz period (12th–14th centuries), given the number of buildings of this type built, can be considered a standard and common solution for single-space domed mosques in Yugoslavia. In Bosnia and Herzegovina, Andrejević lists 8 mosques of this type, including the mosque of Sultan Selim II in Knežina near Sokolac.

All of these mosques bear the characteristics of Ottoman architecture, which is the youngest offshoot of Islamic architecture, but they are spatially significantly smaller than the monumental mosques in Istanbul, Edirne and other centers of the Ottoman Empire. The fact that these buildings are smaller in size than those in Istanbul does not diminish their value but rather is a sign of the material possibilities of the environment in which they were built. By the time the Ottomans occupied Bosnia, they already had an established style of mosques that they built in the newly conquered regions. These were mosques of the Bursa school, which developed under the influence of the Seljuk Mosque and Byzantine domed buildings.

=== Demolition and reconstruction ===
At the beginning of the Bosnian War, in the summer of 1992, the mosque was demolished with explosives, and the perpetrators were local Sebian authorities and militia. Remaining fragments of the mosque were removed form the site and disposed on unknown location. After first Bosniak refugees return in April 2004, all the removed fragments of the demolished mosque were found mostly without a help from local Serb authorities, so it was completely rebuilt from the same material and officially opened on September 4, 2011.

== Collections ==
It was important, especially to historians and art historians, that the mosque preserved the original decorations and levhs (books in form of tablets) in its interior. The impressive collection consisted of eight movable levhs from the 18th and 19th centuries, written in ink on parchment, some of which were illuminated with colored ornaments and liquid gold, and about twenty levhs made on the walls in the fresco technique, which most likely originated in 1788, when the mosque was renovated. The mosque also had its own library with several dozen manuscript works in Bosnian, Arabic, Turkish and Persian languages created between the 17th and 19th centuries. The prayer time here was measured by a large wall clock with a pendulum, more than a century and a half old, and the mosque itself was adorned with an enviable collection of 50 carpets and 30 sajadas, one of the most valuable in Bosnia and Herzegovina.

== Description ==
The interior enclosed space has a square base measuring approximately 8.25 × 8.25 m, and the external dimensions without the portico are 10.30 × 10.30 m. The central space is vaulted with a dome with a crown at a height of 16 m from the floor level of the mosque. The large dome with a diameter of 8.20 m rests on an octagonal drum. The transition from the square base of the central part to the octagonal tambur or drum is achieved through trompes in the corners of the walls.

The minaret is located along the right, outer wall of the mosque. The height of the stone minaret to the šerefe (balcony at the top) is 20 m and with its height it represented one of the higher minarets in Bosnia and Herzegovina. It was built of carved stone. The base of the minaret is square, approximately 2.05 m, which later becomes polygonal. The minaret is entered from the right corner of the prayer space from a two-meter-high gallery, which is a unique exception among mosques, and small semicircular stairs were used to climb to the top. The decorative stone sculpture, which is located below the šerefe, is in the form of stalactites, so that it gives the entire building a special artistic expression.

== Protection ==
Even though it was demolished, the mosque site and material remain were declared National Monument of Bosnia and Herzegovina by KONS on May 10, 2004.

Earlier, in 1951, by decision No. 201/51 of the then National Institute for the Protection of Cultural Monuments and Natural Rarities of the People's Republic of Bosnia and Herzegovina in Sarajevo, the Selimija Mosque was placed under state protection and was declared a cultural monument.

By the Ruling of the Institute for the Protection of Cultural Monuments of the People's Republic of BiH No. 02-883-3 from 1962, the building entered into the register of immovable cultural monuments.

In the Spatial Plan of the Republic of BiH until 2002, the mosque was introduced as a Category II monument.

== Literature ==
- Alija Bejtić, Prilozi za orijentalnu filologiju i istoriju jugoslovenskih naroda pod turskom vladavinom, III-IV, 1952-53., Veselin Masleša,
- Ibrahim Krzović, Arhitektura Bosne i Hercegovine 1878-1918., Umjetnička galerija Bosne i Hercegovine, Sarajevo, 1987.
- Andrejević, Andrej (1984). Islamska Monumentalna Umetnost Xvi Veka U Jugoslaviji Kupolne dzamije. Beograd: Filozofski fakultet u Beogradu, Institut za istoriju umetnosti.
- Dobrila Abazović: Sultan Selimova džamija u Knežini
- Krsmanović, Jovo; Sokanović, Savo; Kosorić, Mirko (2011). Han Pijesak : prostor — vrijeme — ljudi : monografija [Han Pijesak : space — time — people : monograph]. Han Pijesak. ISBN 978-86-914787-0-4.
- Official Gazette of BiH No. 36/05.: Odluka Komisije za očuvanje nacionalnih spomenika, na sjednici održanoj od 4. do 10. maja 2004. godine: „Mjesto i ostaci istorijske građevine Selimije (Sultan Selima II) u Knežini kod Sokoca proglašava se nacionalnim spomenikom Bosne i Hercegovine“.
