= National Monuments of Bosnia and Herzegovina =

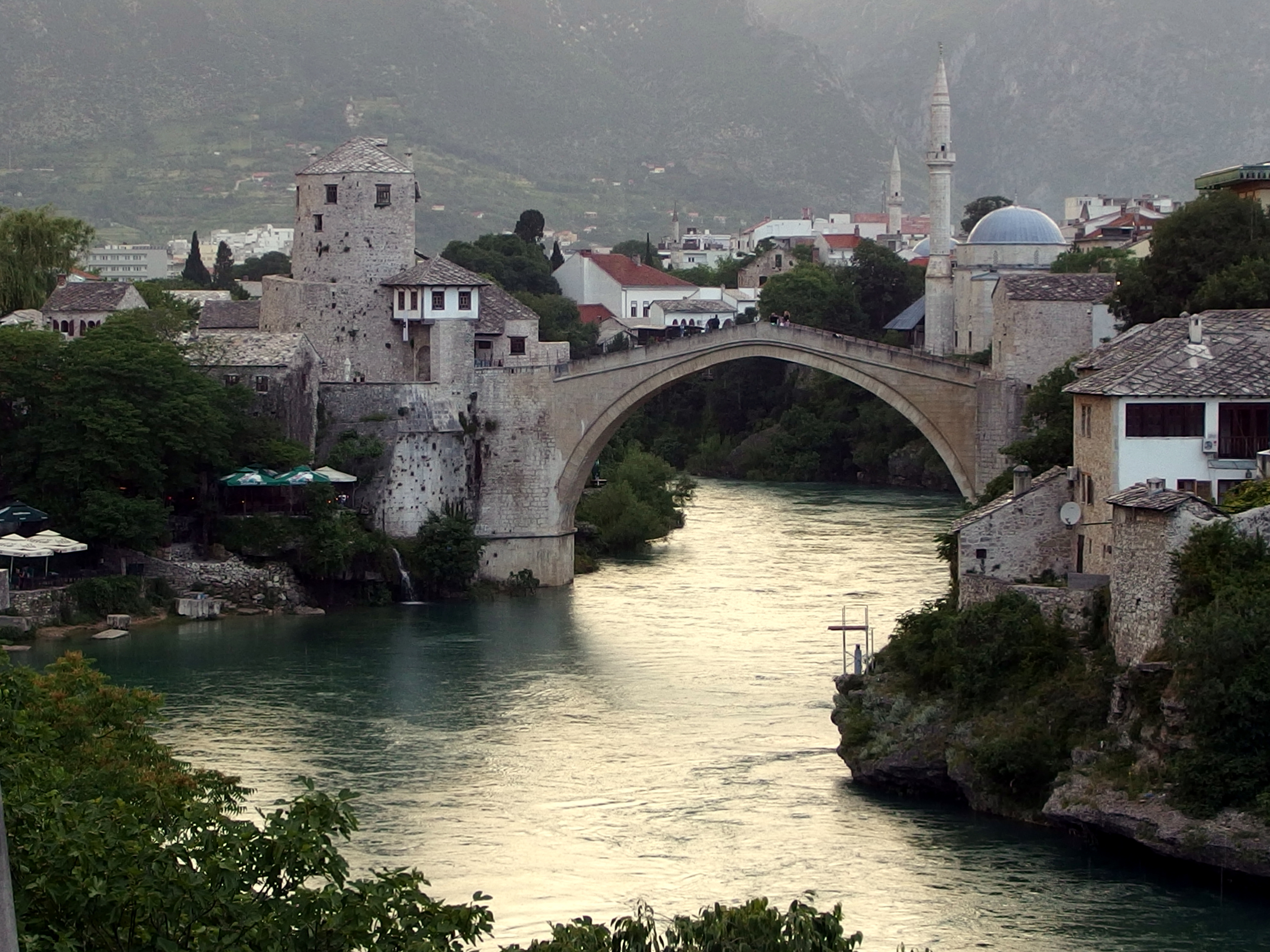
Stari Most in Mostar, one of the 818 national monuments of Bosnia and Herzegovina

National Monuments of Bosnia and Herzegovina are places of cultural importance in Bosnia and Herzegovina. The decision on the proposed properties is made by the Commission to Preserve National Monuments.

== World Heritage Sites in Bosnia & Herzegovina ==
- Stari most and the old town in Mostar
- Mehmed Paša Sokolović Bridge in Višegrad

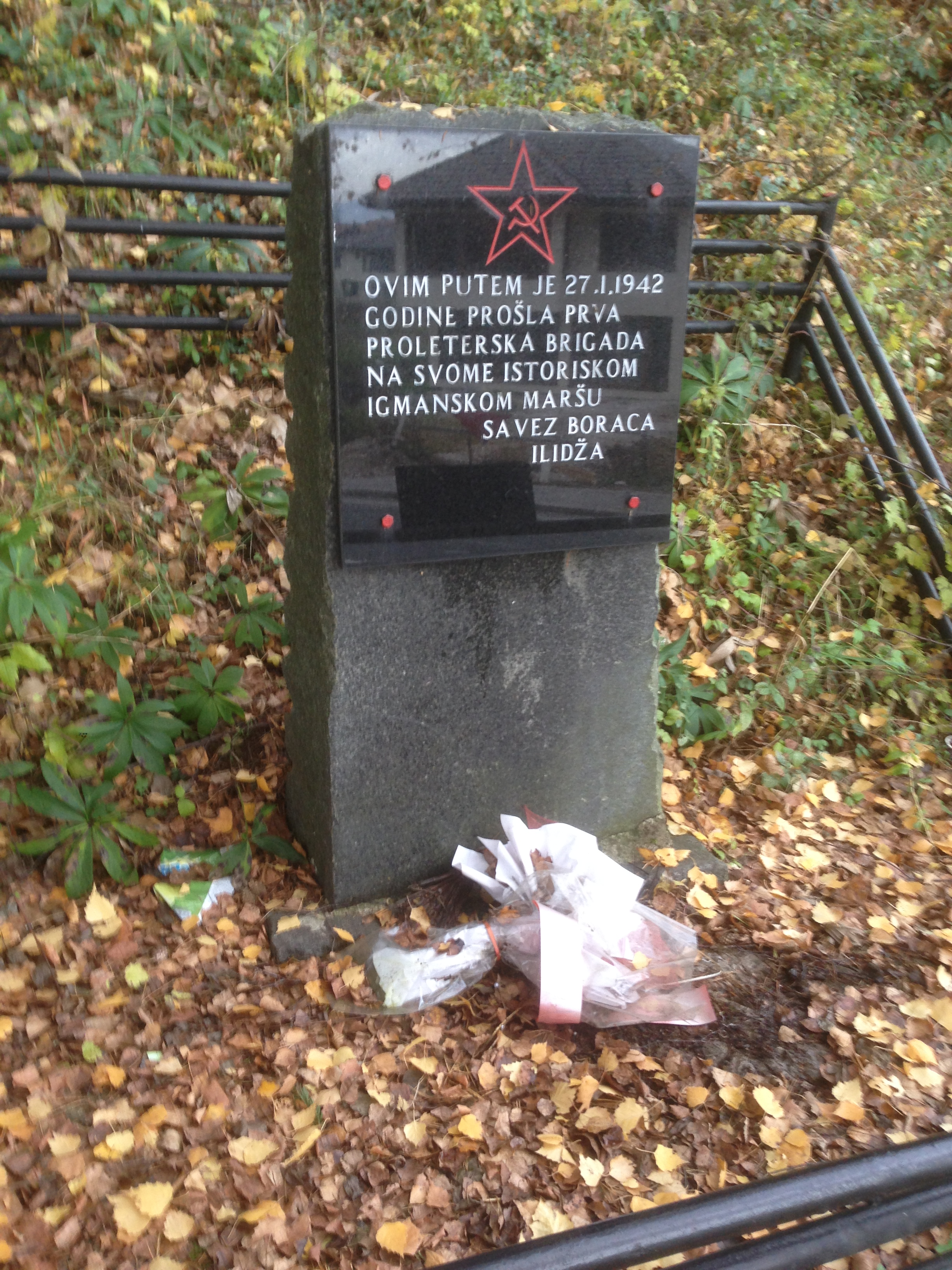
Monument to the Igman March in Blažuj

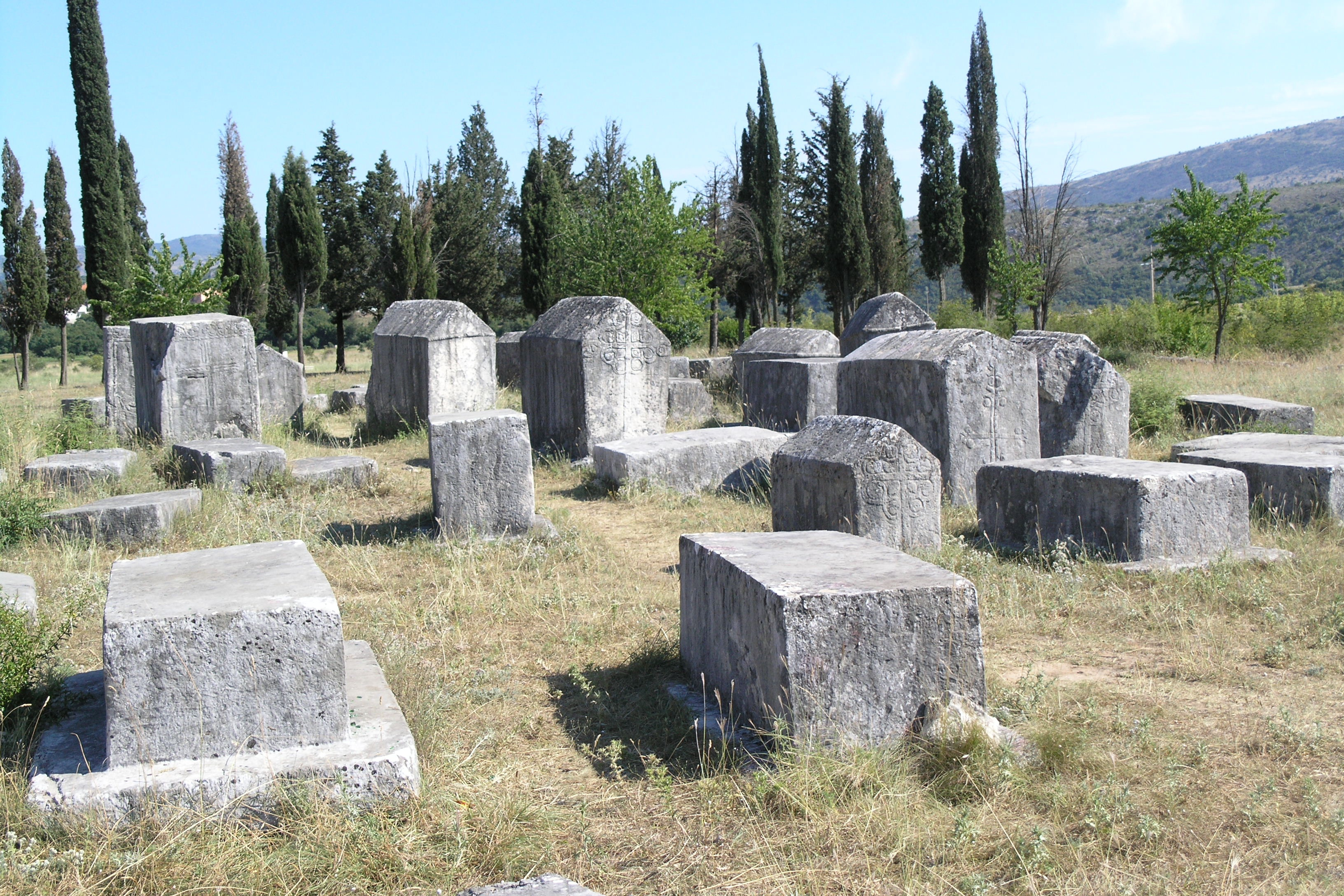
Stećak tombstones of Radimlja

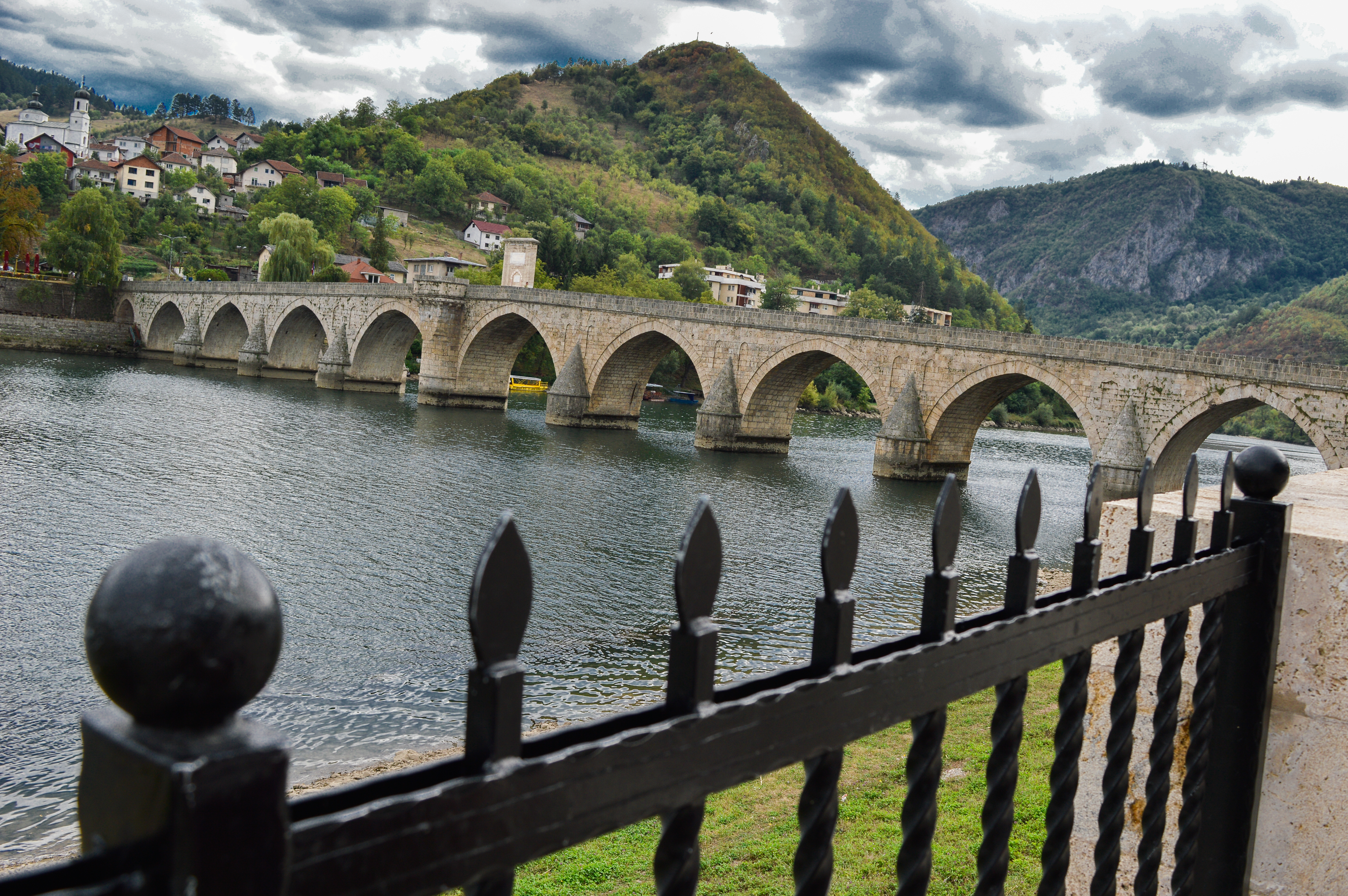
Mehmed-Pasha Sokolović Bridge in Višegrad

== See also ==
- List of National Monuments of Bosnia and Herzegovina
