= Čelebića Mosque =

Mosque in Nevesinje, Bosnia and Herzegovina

- Location of the mosque in Bosnia and Herzegovina

Religion
- Affiliation: Sunni Islam
- Rite: Hanafi
- Ecclesiastical or organisational status: Mosque: (17th century–1992); (since 2006– )
- Ownership: Riyasat - Islamic Community of Bosnia and Herzegovina
- Governing body: Riyasat
- Status: Active

Location
- Location: Donja Bijenja, Nevesinje, Republika Srpska
- Country: Bosnia and Herzegovina
- Coordinates: 44°46′02.69″N 17°11′14.44″E

Architecture
- Type: Mosque
- Style: Ottoman
- Founder: Džaferović or Šurković family
- Completed: Early 17th century (original); 2006 (rebuilt)
- Demolished: 1992 (during the Bosnian War)

Specifications
- Length: 11.5 m (38 ft)
- Width: 8.7 m (29 ft)
- Minaret: 1
- Materials: Limestone

KONS of Bosnia and Herzegovina
- Official name: Čelebić (Džaferović or Šurković) mosque in Donja Bijenja, the historic building
- Type: Category I cultural monument
- Criteria: A; B; C v.; D iv.; E ii., iii., iv., v.; F i., iii.; H i.
- Designated: 28 June 2005 (Session no. -)
- Reference no.: 2569
- Decision no.: 07.2-2-674/03-5
- Listed: List of National Monuments of Bosnia and Herzegovina

The Čelebića Mosque, also known as the Džaferovića Mosque or the Šurkovića Mosque, is a Sunni mosque, affiliated with the Hanafi school, located in Hadžića, or Ratkovića mahali in the settlement of Donja Bijenja, municipality of Nevesinje, in Bosnia and Herzegovina. The village of Bijenja is located at the foot of the Crvanj mountain and is 12 kilometres (7.5 mi) from Nevesinje towards Gacko.

Completed in the late-17th century, during the Ottoman era, the mosque was demolished in 1992 by Serbs at the beginning of Bosnian War. The mosque was restored and inscribed on the List of National Monuments of Bosnia and Herzegovina by KONS, on 28 June 2005.

== History and description ==
In the first half of the 18th century, Donja Bijenja was the center of the congregation. There is no information about the time of creation of the Čelebići Mosque. It belongs to the type of one-room mosques with sofas, a rectangular base, the external dimensions of which are approximately 11.5 by 8.7 metres (38 by 29 ft) and a stone quadrangular minaret.

It is known that this type of mosque was built in eastern Herzegovina in the late 16th and early 17th centuries. In addition to the mosque in Bijenja, the minaret with a quadrangular base had: in the Nevesinje area of Perkušić, the mosque in Nevesinje and the mosque in Kruševljani, mosques in the vicinity of Bileća: Avdića mosque in Plana, Hasan-paša Predojevića in Grabovica, mosques in Kljuna, Kružnje and Svinjarina; Telarevića mosque in Bjeljani near Stolac, then the mosque in Glavatičevo near Konjic and the Fatima Kaduna mosque in Mostar.

The top of the minaret is made in the form of a tented roof, the slope of which was increased by the last intervention carried out in the 1970s. At the very top of the brick part of the minaret, there were four semi-circular window openings measuring approximately 40 by 90 centimetres (16 by 35 in) through which the muezzin would lean his head while reciting the call to prayer. At the very top of the minaret there was an alem.

The mosque was demolished in 1992 by Serbs at the beginning of Bosnian War.

It was renovated and officially opened in 2006. The main project for the reconstruction of the mosque was prepared and donated by the "Stari grad" project bureau from Mostar. Funds for the reconstruction were mainly provided by donations. The mosque has kept the same dimensions and the same appearance.

It was inscribed on the List of National Monuments of Bosnia and Herzegovina by KONS, on 28 June 2005.

== See also ==
- Islam in Bosnia and Herzegovina
- List of mosques in Bosnia and Herzegovina
- List of National Monuments of Bosnia and Herzegovina
