= June 1941 uprising in eastern Herzegovina =

1941 Serb uprising

- Part of World War II in Yugoslavia
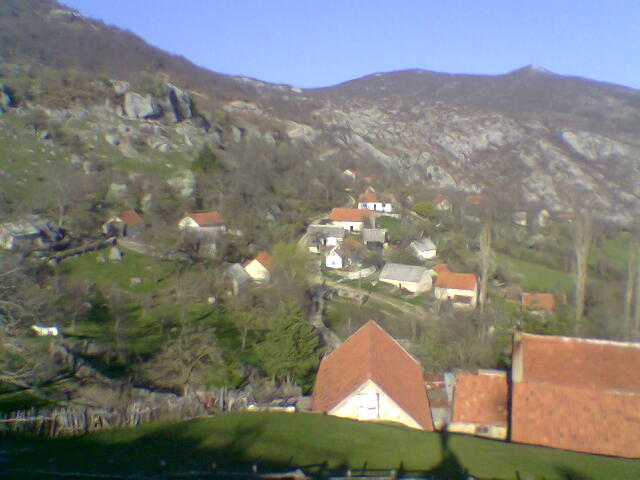
- The capture of the gendarmerie post in Gornji Lukavac was one of the first actions of the uprising
| Date | 23 June – 7 July 1941 |
| Location | Eastern Herzegovina, Independent State of Croatia (present-day Bosnia and Herzegovina) 43.16°N 18.07°E |
| Result | Uprising suppressed |

Belligerents
| Serb rebels from eastern Herzegovina and Montenegro | Independent State of Croatia; Italy |

Commanders and leaders
| Bajo Stanišić; Minja Višnjić; Radojica Nikčević; Čedo Milić | (Independent State of Croatia) Ivan Prpić; (Independent State of Croatia) Antun Prohaska; (Independent State of Croatia) Franjo Šimić; (Independent State of Croatia) Jure Francetić |

Units involved
| No formed units | Elements of Adriatic Command; six Home Guard battalions; one Home Guard company; four 100mm howitzers; ZNDH ground attack and reconnaissance aircraft; Gendarmerie; 2nd Regiment (part); 4th Regiment (part) |

Strength
| 1,500–3,000 | 68 officers, 2,362 men (Note: These figures include 6 officers and 300 men of the 4th Police Regiment. Figures for the numbers of the 2nd Police Regiment have not been located in sources.) |
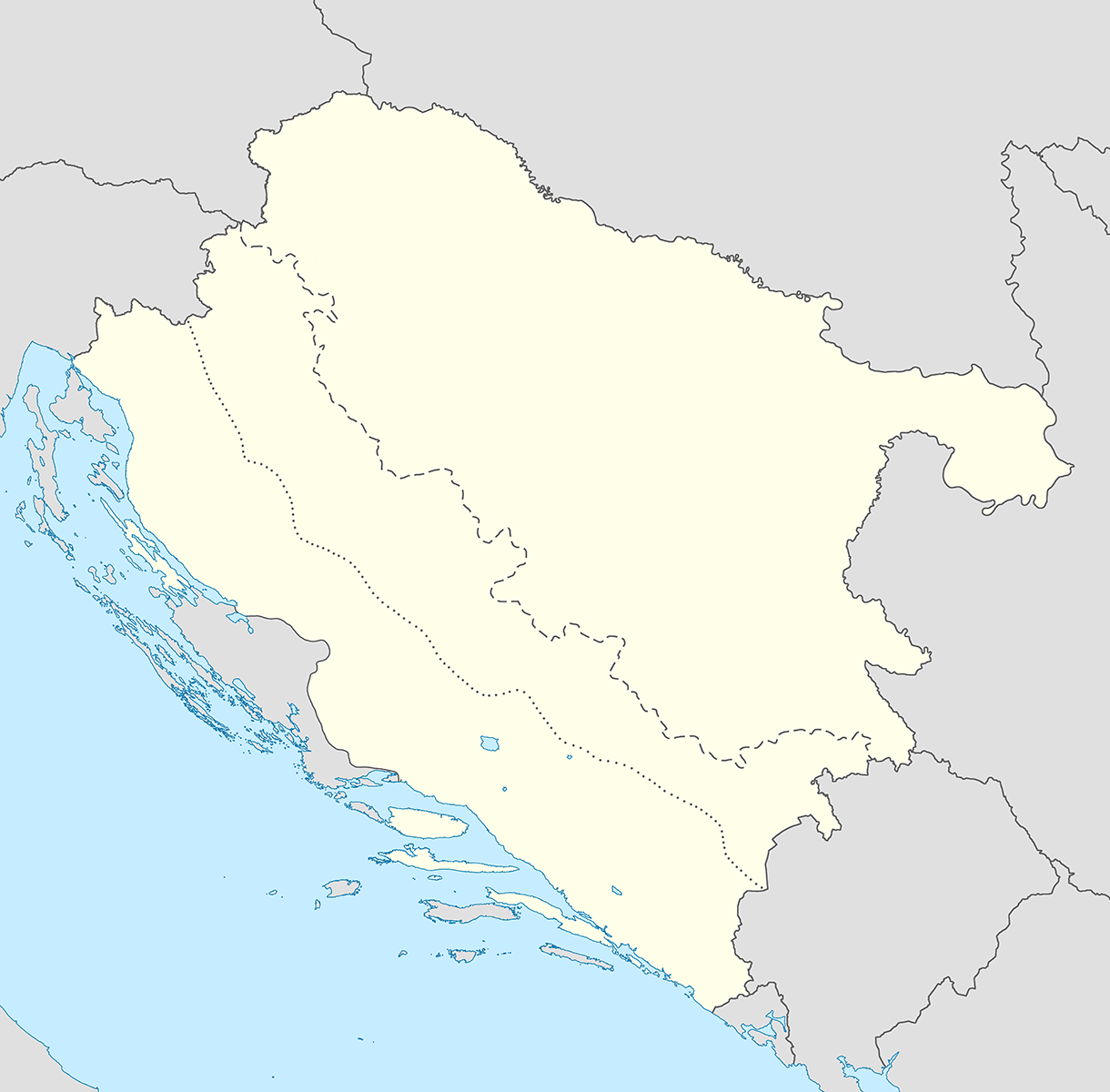
- Location of the town of Nevesinje in eastern Herzegovina. The dashed line denotes the boundary between the German (northeastern) and Italian (southwestern) zones.

In June 1941, Serbs in eastern Herzegovina rebelled against the authorities of the Independent State of Croatia (Croatian: Nezavisna Država Hrvatska, NDH), an Axis puppet state established during World War II on the territory of the defeated and occupied Kingdom of Yugoslavia. As the NDH imposed its authority, members of the fascist Ustaše ruling party began a genocidal campaign against Serbs throughout the country. In eastern Herzegovina, the Ustaše perpetrated a series of massacres and attacks against the majority Serb population commencing in the first week of June. Between 3 and 22 June 1941, spontaneous clashes occurred between NDH authorities and groups of Serbs in the region.

The German invasion of the Soviet Union began on 22 June. Over the next two days, the sporadic revolts by Serbs against the NDH in eastern Herzegovina erupted into mass rebellion, triggered by Ustaše persecution, Serb solidarity with the Russian people, hatred and fear of the NDH authorities, and other factors. Serb rebels, under the leadership of both local Serbs and Montenegrins, attacked police, gendarmerie, Ustaše and Croatian Home Guard forces in the region. In the first few days, the rebels captured gendarmerie posts in several villages, set up roadblocks on the major roads and ambushed several military vehicles. On the night of 26 June, the rebels mounted a sustained attack on the town of Nevesinje in an attempt to capture it, but the garrison held out until the morning of 28 June when NDH troops broke through the rebel roadblocks.

On 28 June, the rebels ambushed a truckload of Italian soldiers, prompting the Italian Army commander in the NDH to warn the NDH government that he would take unilateral action to secure communication routes. A further gendarmerie post was destroyed by the rebels, and in the evening the rebels captured the village of Avtovac, looting and burning it, and killing dozens of non-Serb civilians. The following day an Italian column cleared the rebels from Avtovac and relieved the hard-pressed NDH garrison in the town of Gacko. From 3 July, an NDH force of over 2,000 fanned out from Nevesinje, clearing towns, villages and routes of rebels. The rebel forces did not put up any significant opposition to the clearing operation, and either retreated into nearby Montenegro, or hid their weapons in the mountains and went home. By 7 July, NDH forces had regained full control of all towns and major transport routes in eastern Herzegovina.

== Background ==
The Independent State of Croatia (NDH) was founded on 10 April 1941, during the invasion of Yugoslavia by the Axis powers. The NDH consisted of most of modern-day Croatia and Bosnia and Herzegovina, together with some parts of modern-day Serbia. It was essentially an Italo-German quasi-protectorate, as it owed its existence to the Axis powers, who maintained occupation forces within the puppet state throughout its existence. In the immediate aftermath of the Yugoslav surrender on 17 April, former Royal Yugoslav Army troops returned to their homes in eastern Herzegovina with their weapons. This was a significant security concern for the fledgling NDH government due to the proximity of the border with Montenegro, the close relationship between the people of eastern Herzegovina and Montenegro, and widespread banditry in the region. On the day after the surrender, the commander of the NDH armed forces, Vojskovođa (Marshal) Slavko Kvaternik issued a proclamation demanding the surrender of all weapons to NDH authorities by 24 April.

On 24 April, the NDH created five military command areas, including Bosnia Command and Adriatic Command, both of which were initially headquartered in Sarajevo. Each of the five military commands included several district commands. Adriatic Command included the districts of Knin and Sinj in the Dalmatian hinterland, and Mostar and Trebinje in eastern Herzegovina. The NDH began to mobilise soldiers for the Home Guard, with six battalions identified to join Adriatic Command. The battalions were mobilised from areas outside of eastern Herzegovina, and were to be ready by 20 May. The aggressive actions of the Ustaše fifth column during the Axis invasion made Serb civilian leaders in eastern Herzegovina apprehensive about the NDH, and they attempted to obtain Italian protection, and urged the Italians to annex eastern Herzegovina to the neighboring Italian-occupied territory of Montenegro. A collaborationist "Interim Advisory Committee" of Montenegrin separatists was advocating the establishment of an "independent" Montenegrin state, and a similar committee of separatist Serbs was formed in eastern Herzegovina. A delegation from that committee arrived in Cetinje in Montenegro on 6 May to ask for Italian protection. Similarly, a delegation of Muslims from eastern Herzegovina travelled to Sarajevo, the historic Bosnian capital, to urge the NDH authorities to link eastern Herzegovina to that city.

Due to the poor response to the demand for the surrender of weapons, the deadline was extended several times until a date of 8 July was fixed. On 17 May, courts-martial were established to try those that were arrested in possession of weapons, and those found guilty were immediately executed by firing squad. The precedent for this brutal repressive measure against Serbs had already been established by the Germans. It was clear from the outset that the NDH weapons laws were not being enforced as strictly against Croats as they were against Serbs. Securing the border between eastern Herzegovina and Montenegro was considered a high priority due to concerns that the Montenegrin Federalist Party had revived Montenegrin claims to parts of the NDH that had been promised to the Kingdom of Montenegro in the 1915 Treaty of London.

The Italians handed over the administration of eastern Herzegovina to the NDH government on 20 May 1941, following the signing of the Treaties of Rome, which ceded formerly Yugoslav territory along the Adriatic coast to Italy. The Italians did not immediately withdraw all their troops from the region. The NDH moved quickly to establish its authority in the towns and districts of eastern Herzegovina, which included appointing mayors and prefects, the creation of local units of the Ustaše Militia, and deploying hundreds of gendarmes, Croatian Home Guards and Ustaše Militia units from outside eastern Herzegovina. These forces were brought in to maintain order. The academic Professor Alija Šuljak was appointed the Ustaše commissioner for eastern Herzegovina.

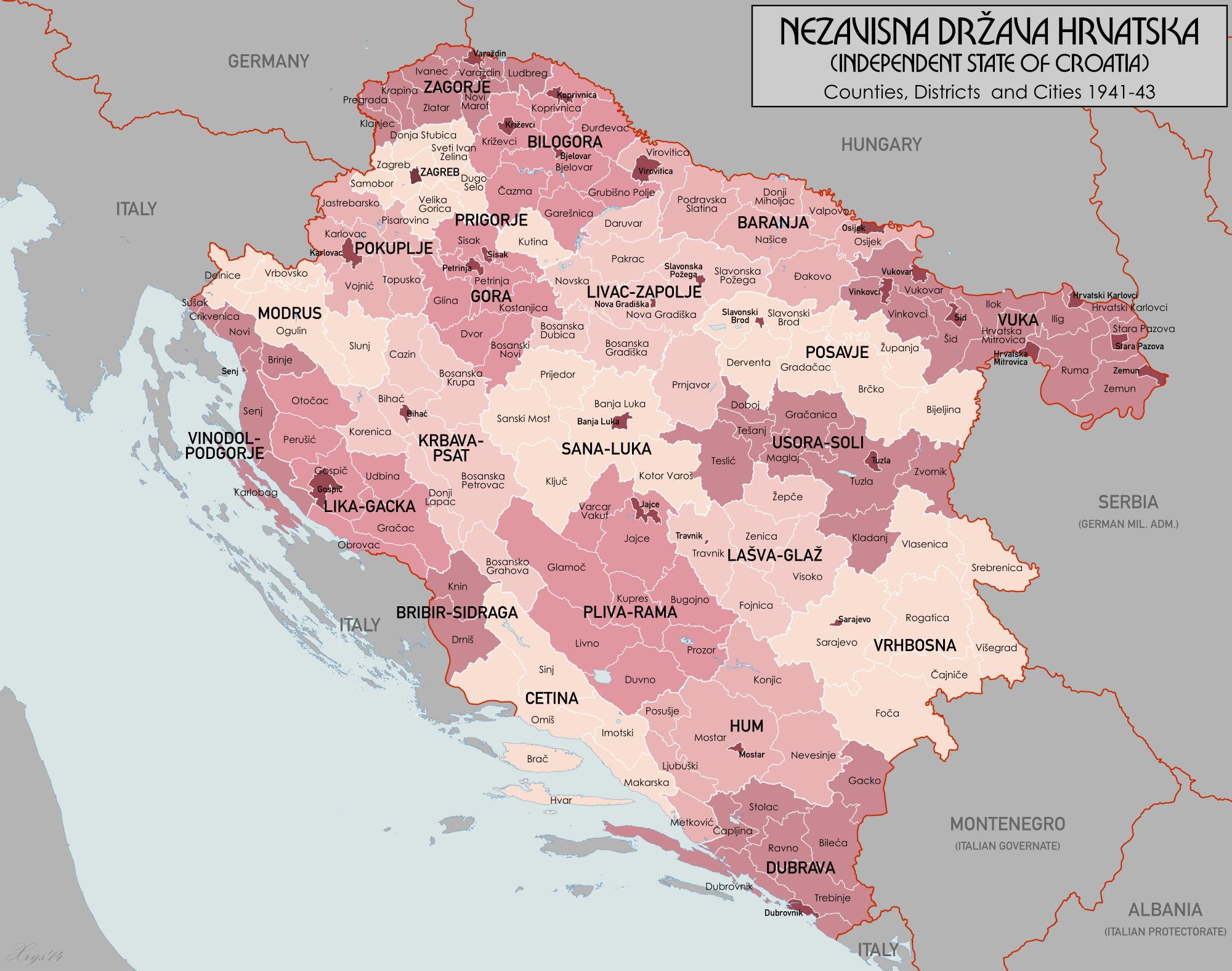
The NDH implemented an administrative structure of counties and districts. Eastern Herzegovina was included in the counties of Hum and Dubrava. Some coastal areas and islands were ceded to Italy under the Treaties of Rome.

On 20 May, the recently formed Home Guard battalions began to deploy into the Adriatic Command area. On 27 May, 6 officers and 300 gendarmes of the Sarajevo-based 4th Gendarmerie Regiment were deployed into parts of eastern Herzegovina. (Note: The Hrvatsko oružništvo (Croatian Gendarmerie) had been established on 30 April as a rural police.) They established platoon strength posts in Nevesinje, Trebinje, Gacko and Bileća, with their headquarters also in Bileća. The Dubrovnik-based 2nd Gendarmerie Regiment established posts in Stolac and Berkovići. The headquarters of Adriatic Command was transferred to Mostar in late May, and General Ivan Prpić was appointed as its commander.

By 29 May, the battalions of Adriatic Command were in their garrison locations: the 6th Battalion at Mostar, the 7th Battalion at Trebinje, and the 10th Battalion in the Dubrovnik area. The other two Adriatic Command battalions were deployed to Knin and Sinj far to the west. The 18th Battalion was allocated as a reserve and was garrisoned in Mostar. Main Ustaše Headquarters was tasked to recruit one battalion for duties within the Adriatic Command area. Home Guard battalions had a standard structure, consisting of a headquarters company, three infantry companies, a machine gun platoon and a communications section, while battalions of the Ustaše Militia consisted of a headquarters, three companies and a motorised section. Even after the establishment of NDH authorities in eastern Herzegovina, Italian forces maintained their presence in the region. The 55th Regiment of the 32nd Infantry Division Marche remained garrisoned in Trebinje, with the 56th Regiment based in Mostar. The 49th MVSN Legion (Blackshirts) were also stationed in Bileća. The Italians maintained a troop presence in Nevesinje until 17 June, and conducted almost daily motorised patrols throughout eastern Herzegovina.

The NDH authorities established new administrative sub-divisions, organising the state into counties (Croatian: velike župe) and then districts (Croatian: kotar). Eastern Herzegovina was covered by the counties of Hum and Dubrava. Hum County included the districts of Mostar and Nevesinje, and Dubrava County included the districts of Bileća, Gacko, Stolac, Ravno and Trebinje. The Župan (county prefect) of Hum was Josip Trajer with his seat in Mostar, and the Župan of Dubrava was Ante Buć, based in Dubrovnik.

According to the Yugoslav census of 1931, the population of eastern Herzegovina comprised 4 per cent Croats, 28 per cent Muslims, and 68 per cent Serbs. According to Professor Jozo Tomasevich, the estimated population of the districts of Bileća, Gacko and Nevesinje was only around 1.1 per cent Croat, so in those areas nearly all the NDH government appointments and local Ustaše units were staffed by Muslims, an ethnic group that made up about 23.7 per cent of the local population. The poor Muslim peasants of eastern Herzegovina largely sided with the Ustaše. The NDH government immediately tried to strengthen their position by vilifying the Serbs, who, according to Tomasevich, comprised around 75 per cent of the population.

== Prelude ==
The Ustaše began to impose the new laws on the Serb population of the NDH. On 28 May, a group of ten young Ustaše students from the University of Zagreb arrived in Trebinje and began removing signs written in the Cyrillic script used by Serbs. On 1 June, in several towns and villages in eastern Herzegovina, Serbs were shot and businesses belonging to Serb merchants and others were seized. On that day, the Ustaše students in Trebinje shot nine Serbs and arrested another fifteen, apparently due to their links to the inter-war Chetnik Association. Differences began to appear between the brutal treatment of Serbs by the Ustaše and the more careful approach of the other NDH authorities such as the Home Guard, who were aware of the potential danger created by Ustaše methods. In early June, the NDH authorities began operations to confiscate weapons from the population, meeting with immediate resistance. On 1 June, the residents of the village of Donji Drežanj, near Nevesinje, refused to co-operate with weapons collectors. In response, the Ustaše killed a number of Serbs and burned their homes. (Note: According to a source whose reliability is considered questionable by Marijan, 28 Serbs were killed on this occasion.)

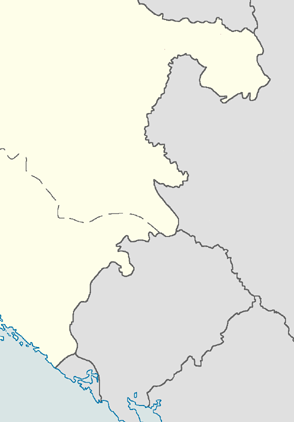
Map showing the locations of Ustaše massacres in eastern Herzegovina prior to the uprising

On 3 June, there were several incidents in which armed villagers spontaneously retaliated against the local authorities. That afternoon, 20 Ustaše were entering Donji Drežanj to confiscate firearms when they were attacked by a group of armed villagers. The villagers withdrew after a short firefight, with one of their number being captured. Reinforcements from the Home Guard and gendarmerie soon arrived, along with more Ustaše who burned another 20 houses and shot a woman. On the night of 4/5 June, a group under the control of the Ustaše commissioner for the Gacko district, Herman Tonogal, (Note: Some sources refer to him as Tongl, Togonal or "Krešo".) killed 140 Serbs in the village of Korita, near Bileća, and threw their bodies into a nearby sinkhole. Another 27 Serbs from the village were killed between this massacre and 9 June, and over 5,000 head of livestock were stolen and distributed to Muslim villages in the Gacko area for the exclusive use of the Ustaše. The estimated number of Serbs killed at Korita vary from 133 to 180.

In the immediate aftermath, Serbs and Montenegrins from the local area attacked villages, and Adriatic Command sent the 2nd Company of the 7th Battalion from Bileća to reinforce the Ustaše. After a brief clash near Korita, during which the Ustaše and gendarmerie lost one killed and several wounded, the rebels withdrew across the nearby border into Montenegro. The 2nd Company of the 7th Battalion spent the night in the village of Stepen before establishing itself as the Avtovac garrison the following day. Due to its exposure to fire from rebels overlooking their location, the gendarmes were unable to re-occupy their post in Stepen, which meant that the Stepen–Korita road was no longer secure. On 8 June, the district office in Gacko reported to Adriatic Command that they had taken 200 Serbs as hostages and issued a proclamation to the population to cease fighting and surrender their weapons. As this proclamation met with no response, on 10 June the Ustaše Commissioner for Bosnia and Herzegovina, Jure Francetić, had 19 hostages shot (one escaped). On 12 June, the gendarmerie in Ravno shot four people on the orders of the Ustaše commissioner for Ljubinje. Such actions led to Serb peasants leaving their villages to seek safety in more remote areas, and Muslim villagers became increasingly nervous about their Serb neighbours.

In mid-June, the commander of the 2nd Company of the 7th Battalion at Bileća wrote to Adriatic Command complaining about the activities of the Ustaše, referring to them as "armed scum and animals" who were dishonouring "honest Croats". When the Italians heard that the Ustaše had burned two villages across the border in Montenegro, they sent an intelligence officer to Gacko to investigate the unrest. He did not accept the explanation of the gendarmerie commander in Gacko, who claimed that the violence was caused by "personal hatred and revenge", and met with rebels. The rebels did not attack him or his security escort, and told him that the reason behind the rebellion was that "Croats and Turks are beating us and throwing us into a pit". (Note: "Turks" was a derogatory term used by Serbs to refer to Muslims, in reference to when the Serbs had been under Ottoman rule.) He concluded that the cause of the unrest was the attempt to disarm the Serb community.

On 17 and 18 June, Tonogal and Lieutenant Colonel Aganović, gendarmerie commander for eastern Herzegovina, made an attempt to calm the situation by visiting villages east of the Gacko–Avtovac road to re-establish peace in the area. They received a written message from four villages that they did not acknowledge the NDH authorities, and wanted the message to be passed on to the Italians. The residents of the villages of Jasenik and Lipnik were willing to talk and return to work, but they asked that the gendarmerie not visit their villages, as this would tempt the Montenegrins to attack. Aganović assessed that while this was probably true, their request was insincere. The gendarmerie commander in Bileća believed that the reason for the rebellion was that the local Serbs were wedded to the idea of Greater Serbia, and did not accept that their villages were part of the NDH. This approach essentially meant that local Serbs wanted the NDH authorities to leave them alone and not impose on their lives. According to the historian Davor Marijan, this was a poor choice that gave the Ustaše an excuse to take radical action.

The response of the NDH authorities to resistance had been to burn down the villages where this had occurred, and there were mass shootings of Serbs, which escalated the level of violence even further. In late May and June, 173 Serbs had been rounded up, tortured and killed in Nevesinje, and in early June, another 140 Serbs had been killed at Ljubinje. In response, Serbs attacked Ustaše officials and facilities, and conducted raids themselves, killing Muslim villagers.

== Uprising ==
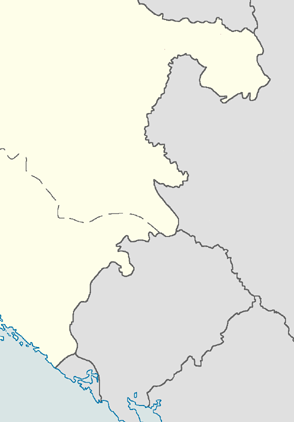
Map showing the locations of Croatian Home Guard garrisons in eastern Herzegovina at the time of the uprising

The NDH authorities only had weak forces in eastern Herzegovina at the time the mass uprising occurred, roughly equal to two Croatian Home Guard battalions, as well as gendarmerie posts in some towns. This was barely adequate to guard important locations, and was insufficient for offensive action. Deployed forces consisted of one company of the 10th Battalion in Trebinje, the headquarters and a reinforced company of the 7th Battalion in Bileća (the balance of the battalion being divided between Gacko and Avtovac), and a company of the 6th Battalion in Nevesinje. The remainder of the 10th Battalion was deploying to Trebinje at the time the rebellion broke out.

=== 23–24 June ===
The first indication that the situation had changed significantly was on 23 June, when a group of 200 Ustaše clashed with a group of rebels they estimated to number between 600 and 1,000. After an extended firefight near the village of Stepen, 5 km (3.1 mi) north of Korita, during which they suffered several casualties, the Ustaše also burned down four villages. They then entered two Muslim-majority villages in the area and arrested 13 Serbs who had not been involved in the earlier fighting. The arrested Serbs were transported north to Avtovac and shot. That night, all adult Serbs above the age of 16 in Gacko, 4.5 km (2.8 mi) northwest of Avtovac, were arrested, and 26 were immediately shot. The rest were transported 50 km (31 mi) west to a camp in Nevesinje. Over the period 23–25 June, 150 Serbs from the village of Ravno, 30 km (19 mi) southwest of Ljubinje, were arrested and killed at the gendarmerie post, and the remainder of the population fled to the hills.

On 23 and 24 June, spontaneous mass gatherings occurred at several villages in the Gacko and Nevesinje districts. (Note: According to a source whose reliability is considered questionable by Marijan, one of these meetings was in the village of Gornji Lukavac deep in the hinterland east of Stolac, from which couriers were sent to Nevesinje, Gacko and Bileća inviting them to join the rebels.) These rallies were prompted by the news of the German invasion of the Soviet Union, and those attending them voted to fight against the Ustaše. Professor Marko Attila Hoare states that the full-scale uprising resulted from the Ustaše retaliation against attempts of the Serbs of eastern Herzegovina to defend themselves, combined with the launching of the German invasion on 22 June. At dawn on 24 June, the area of Nevesinje descended into full-scale revolt, with around 400 armed rebels engaging the Home Guard garrison. By 24 June, the uprising had reached a massive scale across eastern Herzegovina, with between 1,500 and 3,000 armed rebels in total, including some Montenegrins.

=== 25 June ===
On the morning of 25 June, the company of the 6th Battalion at Nevesinje reported that rebels were gathering to attack the town; Nevesinje's Ustaše commissioner claimed that the rebel force numbered 5,000, and were led by a former Yugoslav Army colonel. About 10:00, the town was attacked from the south and southwest. In response, the Home Guard despatched two more companies of the 6th Battalion from Mostar to Nevesinje. That morning, reports also arrived from Bileća and Stolac that rebels were approaching the village of Berkovići from the north, and had captured the gendarmerie post at Gornji Lukavac. About 11:30, the Ustaše commissioner for Stolac reported that 3,000 Montenegrins had gathered between Nevesinje and Stolac, and he requested the immediate supply of 150 rifles for his men. A rebel attack on the gendarmerie post in the village of Divin near Bileća was repulsed around midday. A platoon of Home Guard reinforcements and weapons for the Ustaše arrived at Stolac in the afternoon, and Bileća was held throughout the day.

Reports of the uprising reached Kvaternik during 25 June, but he dismissed them and the reports of 5,000 rebels, cancelling Adriatic Command's redeployment of the 21st Battalion from Slavonski Brod as well as a request to the Italians for air reconnaissance support. He stated that the suppression of the uprising could be handled by local forces. Loss of communication with Nevesinje resulted in rumours that the town had fallen to the rebels. The gendarmerie post at Fojnica (near Gacko) was captured on the afternoon of 25 June, with the survivors escaping to Gacko. Newspapers reported rumours that Gacko and Avtovac had fallen to the rebels. Having already despatched a reinforced company towards Nevesinje from Sarajevo earlier in the day, Adriatic Command ordered the rest of the battalion to follow. The initial company group had already reached Kalinovik some 60 kilometres (37 mi) from Nevesinje, and the rest of the battalion was expected to spend the night of 25/26 June there before arriving in Nevesinje around noon on 26 June. Kvaternik received an updated report on the situation in eastern Herzegovina during the night, and Prpić travelled from Sarajevo to Mostar to take control of operations, to find that information about the situation in eastern Herzegovina was unclear, but suggested that NDH forces could be facing serious difficulties.

=== 26 June ===
On the morning of 26 June, the company of the 6th Battalion that had been sent from Mostar continued towards Nevesinje, but almost immediately came under fire from a rebel group. With the assistance of Ustaše, the Home Guard were able to hold their ground, but they were unable to break through to Nevesinje. That afternoon, two aircraft of the Air Force of the Independent State of Croatia (Croatian: Zrakoplovstvo Nezavisne Države Hrvatske, ZNDH) from Sarajevo conducted an armed reconnaissance over eastern Herzegovina, and discovered that NDH forces still held Nevesinje. They observed barricades across the Mostar–Nevesinje road, and strafed a group of 50 rebels north of Nevesinje near the village of Kifino Selo. Prpić bolstered the force on the Mostar–Nevesinje road with the 17th Battalion, recently arrived from Sarajevo, and sent his deputy, Colonel Antun Prohaska to command it. The 17th Battalion joined that force at 20:00. About 17:00, the company of the 11th Battalion reached Nevesinje from Kalinovik, and a further company of the battalion was despatched from Sarajevo, along with the battalion commander.

In the southern part of the area of operations around Stolac, the situation was significantly calmer than around Nevesinje, although a group of 200 Ustaše at Berkovići were falsely claiming that they were being surrounded by rebels at night. Despite this claim, they had suffered no casualties. Regardless, Prpić sent them ammunition and a platoon of the 18th Battalion. At 19:00 on 26 June, Francetić arrived at Prpić's headquarters in Mostar to be briefed on the situation. He resolved that he would travel to Berkovići the following day and take personal command of the Ustaše unit there.

Around Gacko and Avtovac in the north, the day had been quiet. When the commander of the 2nd Company of the 7th Battalion at Gacko reported rebels gathering near the town, Prpić sent a truck-mounted platoon with an ammunition resupply. The platoon was ambushed en route, with 14 Home Guardsmen being captured. Gacko was reinforced later in the day from troops in Avtovac. On the night of 26 June, the Nevesinje garrison was subjected to a sustained attack by the rebels, but held out.

The NDH authorities in Trebinje heard rumours that the Serbs could start an uprising there on 28 June, the feast day of Saint Vitus, and warned NDH forces in the region to be prepared for a revolt. As a result of these reports, the Poglavnik (leader) of the NDH, Ante Pavelić, issued orders threatening that anyone who spread these rumours would be court-martialled. On the eve of the feast day, both the gendarmerie and Ustaše took several hostages in case the rumours were true. Later, the gendarmerie released their hostages, but the 19 hostages held by the Ustaše were killed. In contrast to the actions of the Ustaše, the Home Guard units in the area tried to calm the situation down.

=== 27–28 June ===
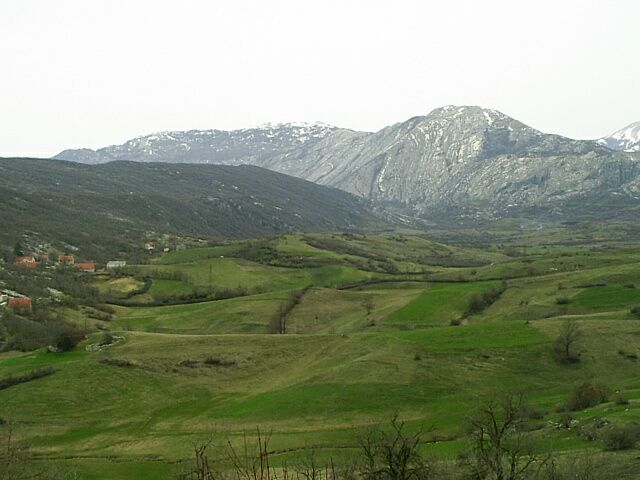
The Gacko district was one of the centres of the uprising.

On the morning of 27 June, Prpić launched a three-pronged assault to clear the routes to Nevesinje. Prohaska commanded the push east along the Mostar–Nevesinje road by a force close to two battalions, Francetić led his unit of Ustaše north from Berkovići through the mountains via Odžak to approach Nevesinje from the south, and two companies of the 11th Battalion thrust southwest along the road from Plužine. Once this task was complete, the NDH forces were to vigorously pursue the rebels and destroy them.

The Prohaska group deployed with one company on the road, and elements of the 17th Battalion and 70 Ustaše on the left flank. Their attack commenced about 10:00, and although they faced strong resistance from the rebels, aided by strafing and bombing by ZNDH aircraft, they reached villages on the outskirts of Nevesinje after fighting that lasted until dawn on 28 June. One Home Guard battalion halted and took up a defensive stance, and the commander was threatened with dismissal by Prpić before he resumed the attack. Francetić's Ustaše unit also faced heavy fighting, and had to call for ammunition resupply on two occasions. One of the resupply vehicles was ambushed by rebels between Stolac and Berkovići, and some ammunition was finally delivered by passenger car during the night. Elsewhere, rebels attacked Gacko and Avtovac, and one ZNDH aircraft was shot down by rebel machine gun fire near Avtovac. That night, Prpić telephoned Kvaternik and advised him that the imposition of martial law was necessary to restore order to Herzegovina. Army Chief of Staff General Vladimir Laxa was immediately appointed by Pavelić to control both Hum and Dubrava counties, which incorporated much of eastern Herzegovina.

On 28 June, Laxa became the overall commander of all NDH authorities in Hum and Dubrava counties, which included Ustaše, Home Guard, civil administration, gendarmerie and police. Military courts were established to deal with those resisting the NDH authorities. Armed guards were posted at the entrance to towns and villages, and any armed civilians were to be disarmed and brought to military authorities. Laxa issued an order that gave the rebels until 2 July to submit to the authorities. On that day, after the Prohaska group broke through to Nevesinje from Mostar, Prohaska sent a company of the 6th Battalion to Kifino Selo to meet the two companies of the 11th Battalion advancing from Plužine. Despite ZNDH air support, the company of the 6th Battalion was attacked by rebels near the entrance to Kifino Selo and the majority broke and ran. Prohaska had to send reserves to block the road between Nevesinje and Kifino Selo, and the companies from the 11th Battalion began to reconnoitre the rebel positions towards Odžak.

Also on that morning, the 200 Home Guard troops and about 50 armed locals in Avtovac were attacked from three directions by rebels. They recovered from their initial surprise and held the town during the day, but in the evening a renewed assault caused them to withdraw from Avtovac and retreat to the villages of Međuljići and Ključ. Upon capturing Avtovac, the rebels looted the village, burned down a large number of Muslim homes and killed 32 Muslim civilians, mostly women, children and the elderly. Gacko was also attacked by the rebels, with eight soldiers killed, and one officer and 12 soldiers wounded. Also on 28 June, two Italian Army trucks driving from Bileća to Avtovac were ambushed by rebels, who killed three soldiers and wounded 17. Around 18:00, the Italian command advised Kvaternik that they would be clearing the route from Bileća via Gacko to Nevesinje on an unspecified future date. During the fighting around Gacko, several ZNDH aircraft were forced to land due to pilot casualties and engine trouble. ZNDH air support operations were suspended due to lack of fuel and spares for the aircraft.

There was no improvement in the situation around Stolac, and an Ustaše unit made up of armed civilians proved to be of such low combat value that Laxa spoke to Francetić and criticised its performance. South of Bileća, rebels destroyed the gendarmerie post in a village, killing seven gendarmes. Dozens of gendarmes were sent from Trebinje to assist them, but they were stopped by rebels and withdrew into a village schoolhouse. In the afternoon a platoon of the 10th Home Guard Battalion was sent north from Trebinje to support the gendarmes, but they were attacked near the village of Mosko, and withdrew into a defensive position. They were reinforced by a second platoon during the night, and were given orders to clear the road from Trebinje to Bileća on the following morning ahead of the Italians.

=== 29–30 June ===
At dawn on 29 June, the rebels attacked the Ustaše in a village on the Mostar–Nevesinje road. Prohaska demanded help from Mostar, and planned to send a force from Nevesinje to assist. From Mostar, a company of the 21st Battalion was despatched to relieve the Ustaše, who had managed to hold off the rebels. The Home Guard company then took over the post from the Ustaše. The same day, two new battalions arrived in Mostar, the 23rd Battalion from Osijek and the 15th Battalion from Travnik. These reinforcements arrived just as Prpić received confirmation that Avtovac had been captured by the rebels. The remaining small garrison in Gacko, consisting of only 20 gendarmes and 30 Ustaše, were holding out but expecting more attacks by the rebels. In the morning, the attack by elements of the 10th Battalion stalled until the battalion commander, Lieutenant Colonel Julije Reš, personally took command of the operation, clearing the way for the Italians. The promised Italian intervention commenced about midday, and about 100 trucks of Italian soldiers arrived in Gacko about 17:00. As they had passed through Avtovac, the rebels had left the town and withdrawn to villages to the east. About 18:00, the 10th Battalion relieved the besieged gendarmes in the village schoolhouse. ZNDH aircraft from Mostar airfield flew reconnaissance sorties over the area and dropped leaflets over Stolac, Stepen, Avtovac, Gacko and Plužine.

After the garrison of Nevesinje had been relieved, Laxa directed his main effort towards the Gacko and Avtovac districts. Sensitive to the fact that the Italians had not respected the territorial borders of the NDH when they sent their column to Gacko, he considered it very important that Croatian military and political prestige be restored, otherwise the Italians might decide to remain in the area rather than withdraw to their garrison near the Adriatic coast. He planned to follow this consolidation by clearing the border areas with Montenegro then clearing the hinterland of any remaining rebels. For this last task he intended to deploy a yet-to-be-formed special unit to be led by Lieutenant Colonel Josip Metzger. The task of re-asserting NDH authority in the Gacko and Avtovac districts was allocated to Prohaska's group, consisting of the 6th Battalion, one company of the 18th Battalion, two companies of the 17th Battalion, and the recently arrived 15th and 21st Battalions, which were to be sent to Nevesinje from Mostar. Prohaska was to act in concert with the 11th Battalion who were already in the vicinity of Plužine, just to the north of the Nevesinje–Gacko road. In preparation, the 15th Battalion was trucked to Nevesinje, and a company of the 17th Battalion conducted a coordinated attack with the 11th Battalion on rebel positions near Kifino Selo. This attack was defeated by the rebels, and a battalion commander was killed.

During the remainder of the day, the Italians collected the bodies of their dead from the rebel ambush on 28 June, and rescued some Home Guard troops that had escaped Avtovac, but then returned to Plana, just north of Bileća. The value of further operations in the Gacko and Avtovac areas was brought into question when the Italians reported that both towns had been burned to the ground, and all the inhabitants had been massacred. The Italians blamed Montenegrins attached to the rebels for the destruction and killings in the two towns. The Italian estimate of rebel strength was around 3,000 armed with machine guns, artillery and anti-aircraft guns. A German intelligence officer from Sarajevo arrived at Prpić's headquarters in Mostar to receive a briefing on the situation. The small garrison of Gacko was anticipating an attack by rebels during the night, but in the afternoon 180 Home Guardsmen that had withdrawn from Avtovac arrived to bolster their position, and the night passed without incident.

=== 1–7 July ===
On 1 July, an Italian armoured unit arrived in Gacko to reinforce the garrison. An Ustaše operation to clear the insurgents from the Stolac district began on 3 July, meeting with success and opening of the road from Berkovci north to Odžak. The Ustaše did not go closer to Nevesinje as they were not in uniform, and were concerned that the Home Guards would mistake them for rebels. During this operation, three Ustaše were killed, including their commander, and the Ustaše fighters killed ten rebels and captured two. In the belongings of one of the captured rebels, the Ustaše located a report by the "National Movement for the Liberation of Nevesinje" (Serbo-Croatian Latin: Narodni pokret za oslobođenje Nevesinja), which was apparently how the rebels referred to themselves. The report made it clear that the rebels were using military tactics and organisation, and hinted at co-operation with the Italians. According to information gathered by the police, the local rebel leadership included former Mostar merchant Čedo Milić, the Bjelogrlić brothers from Avtovac, the Orthodox priest Father Mastilović from Nadinići, and a Captain Radović from Avtovac. Montenegrins involved in the leadership of the uprising included Colonel Bajo Stanišić, Major Minja Višnjić, and Radojica Nikčević from Nikšić.

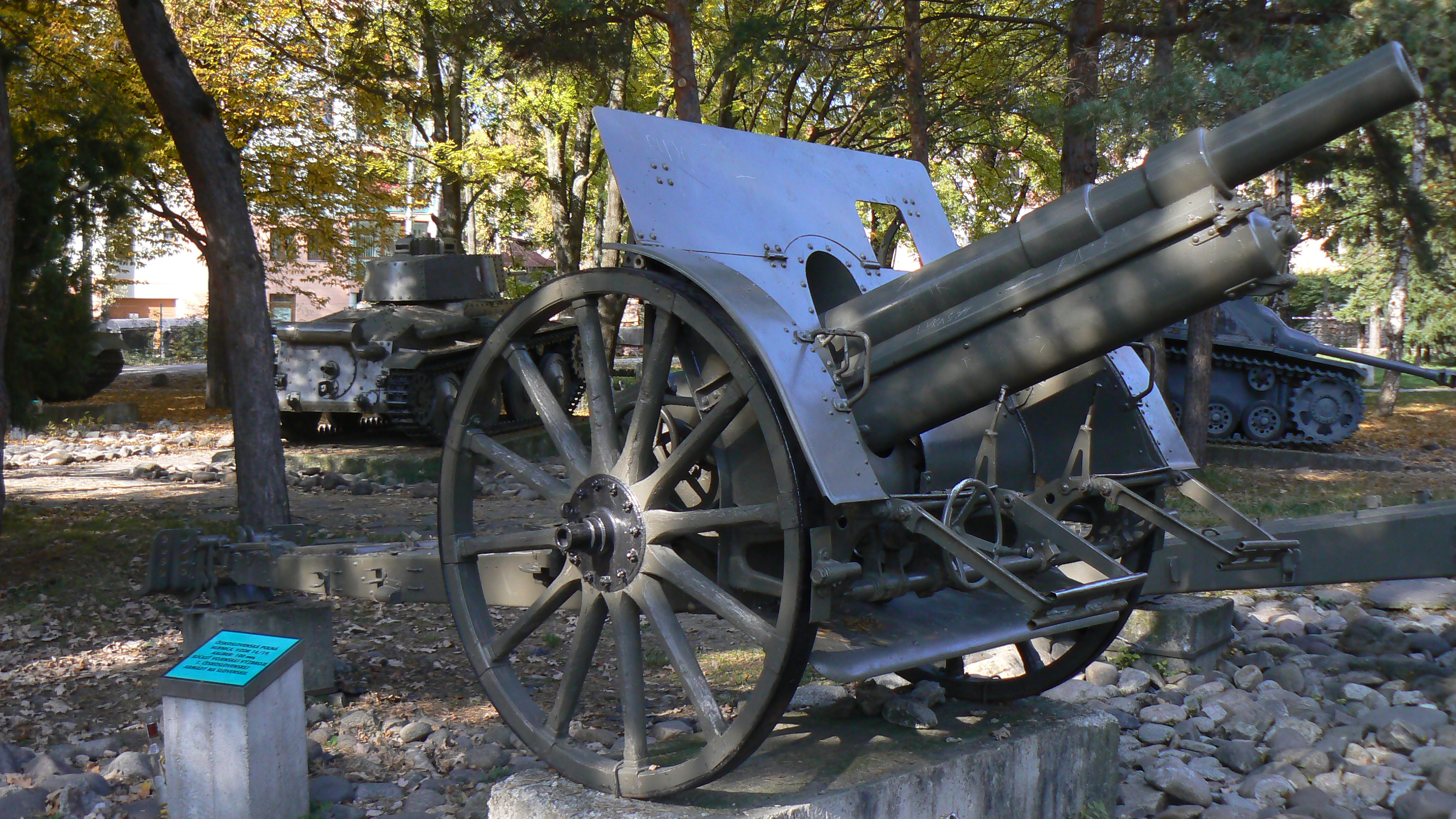
The force responsible for clearing eastern Herzegovina was supported by four World War I-vintage Skoda houfnice vz 14 mountain howitzers.

Following the Italian intervention, Prpić was able to proceed with the task of clearing the wider area of Nevesinje from 3 July, ensuring NDH control of population centres and roads. On 5 July, he replaced his deputy Prohaska with Colonel Franjo Šimić, and assigned him a force consisting of the 6th, 11th, 15th and 17th Battalions, a company of the 18th Battalion and a troop of artillery. The force numbered 62 officers and 2,062 men, with heavy weapons including four 100 mm Skoda houfnice vz 14 mountain howitzers, six heavy machine guns and twenty-seven light machine guns. Šimić seized the crossroads near Kifino Selo and Plužine, securing it with one company of the 11th Battalion, then sent the 15th Battalion to Gacko and the 17th Battalion to Berkovići. A half company of the 21st Battalion secured the Mostar–Nevesinje road. Once this was completed, the major roads in eastern Herzegovina were secured. These operations proceeded without significant fighting, as some of the rebels retreated over the border with Montenegro, and others hid their weapons in the mountains and returned to their homes. By 7 July, NDH forces had regained full control over all the towns and transport routes in eastern Herzegovina.

== Aftermath ==
Tomasevich states that the uprising was a "spontaneous, unorganised outburst" that was doomed to failure, and involved neither the Chetniks of Draža Mihailović nor the Communist Party of Yugoslavia (Serbo-Croatian Latin: Komunistička partija Jugoslavije, KPJ). He contends that the uprising was the result of several factors, including the Ustaše persecutions, fear and hatred of the NDH authorities, a local tradition of rebellion against the Ottoman Empire, the poor economic conditions in eastern Herzegovina, and news of the launching of Operation Barbarossa against the Soviet Union. Hoare concurs with Tomasevich that the uprising was in the tradition of the Herzegovinian rebellions against the Ottoman Empire during the 19th century, such as the uprisings in 1875–77. Edmund Glaise-Horstenau, the German Plenipotentiary General in the NDH, believed that the Italians might have deliberately avoided interfering in the uprising. General Renzo Dalmazzo, the commander of the Italian 6th Army Corps, blamed the Ustaše and Muslims for stoking the revolt.

In eastern Herzegovina, the KPJ had little impact until mid-August 1941, well after the initial revolt had been suppressed. During the lead-up to the mass uprising, the KPJ organisation in Herzegovina would not commit itself, as it was waiting for orders from the provincial organisation in Sarajevo, which was expecting direction from the KPJ Central Committee to launch a general uprising across Yugoslavia. Once they became aware of the German attack on the Soviet Union, the KPJ in Herzegovina voted to join the mass uprising, but this only occurred on 24 June, when the uprising was already in full swing. According to Milazzo, the rebels remained a threat throughout eastern Herzegovina well into July, although the uprising in Herzegovina did not advance until the Bosnia-wide revolt occurred at the end of July, by which time the KPJ was ready for active involvement in the fighting.
