= Presjeka =

Presjeka may refer to the following places:

- Presjeka, Nevesinje
- Presjeka, Višegrad
