= Zalužje =

Zalužje may refer to the following places:

- Bosnia and Herzegovina
  - Zalužje (Bratunac)
  - Zalužje (Nevesinje)
- Croatia
  - Zalužje, Croatia, a village near Lepoglava
