= Ivo Herenčić =

Croatian general and war criminal

Ivan Herenčić
- Born: 28 February 1910; Bjelovar, Croatia-Slavonia, Austria-Hungary
- Died: 8 December 1978 (aged 68); Buenos Aires, Argentina
- Military career
- Allegiance: Independent State of Croatia
- Service years: 1941–1945
- Rank: General
- Nicknames: Ivo; Konzul
- Commands: 1st Ustaše Company; 5th Ustaše Corps
- Conflicts: World War II (WIA)

Ivan "Ivo" Herenčić (28 February 1910 – 8 December 1978) was a general in the armed forces of the Axis puppet state known as the Independent State of Croatia (NDH). In 1941, he commanded an Ustaše Militia battalion that committed many war crimes against civilians during the Genocide of Serbs in the Independent State of Croatia.

Born in Bjelovar while it was part of Austria-Hungary, Herenčić completed his secondary and tertiary education in Zagreb and Sarajevo in what was by then the Kingdom of Yugoslavia. In 1933, he left Yugoslavia to join the fascist and ultranationalist Croatian Ustaše movement in Italy. Late that year, he participated in an unsuccessful assassination attempt on King Alexander of Yugoslavia. Herenčić returned to his homeland when the NDH was established following the Axis invasion of Yugoslavia in April 1941. He was later sent to the Herzegovina region, where he formed and commanded the Mostar Battalion, which committed war crimes in both Bosnia and Herzegovina. Herenčić also served in the surveillance departments of the NDH, and committed atrocities that made him much feared. After being implicated in a 1943 assassination attempt on Home Guard general Ivan Prpić, Herenčić had to emigrate to Hungary. Several months later, he was brought back to the NDH to help uncover the Lorković–Vokić plot against the puppet state's government.

In March 1945, Herenčić was appointed as the commander of the 5th Ustaše Corps of the Croatian Armed Forces (HOS). That same month, he served as one of the commanders of the HOS's withdrawal towards Austria, and later participated in negotiations with the British, who decided that members of the NDH armed forces and accompanying civilians would not be allowed to proceed further and would have to surrender to the Yugoslav Partisans. Herenčić evaded the Yugoslav pursuit of Nazi collaborators and was able to escape to Italy and later to Argentina, where he died in 1978.

== Early life ==
Ivo Herenčić was born on 28 February 1910 in Bjelovar, a city in the Kingdom of Croatia-Slavonia, a part of the Austro-Hungarian Empire. He attended high school in Zagreb after which he attended a business college (Note: Croatian: Ekonomsko-komercijalna visoka škola) in the same city. From 1930 to 1931, he attended the school for reserve officers of the Royal Yugoslav Army in Sarajevo. In the early 1930s, Herenčić was a member of the security detail for the leader of the Croatian Peasant Party, Vladko Maček.

== Ustaše activity ==
In 1933, Herenčić left Yugoslavia and on 9 September he joined a camp for members of the ultra-nationalist and fascist Ustaše organisation in Borgo Val di Taro, Italy. While in Italy, he adopted pseudonym Hetman. this being a historical military title used in the Polish–Lithuanian state.

Herenčić was a leader of an Ustaše plot to assassinate Alexander, King of Yugoslavia, in Zagreb. The King was visiting the city to celebrate his and his wife Maria's birthday and the anniversary of the creation of Yugoslavia. In Piacenza, on 9 December 1933, Herenčić met with another Ustaša, Petar Oreb, who was meant to assassinate the King. Oreb and Herenčić traveled to Klagenfurt in Austria using fake passports in the names of Emil Benedikt and Janoš Kren respectively. They illegally crossed the Austrian–Yugoslav border and spent a night in Celje. They arrived in Zagreb on 11 December and were welcomed into the home of Josip Begović, a student. On 16 December, (Note: Sources contradict on the date the King arrived in Zagreb. Adriano and Cingolani give the date as 11 December while Krizman and Skoko give that date as 16 December.) the King arrived in Zagreb and was welcomed by a crowd at Jelačić Square. Oreb was in the crowd and had two hand grenades in his pockets which he had been taught how to throw in a training camp in Vischetto. Herenčić and Begović were also nearby. Oreb was tasked with assassinating the King while Begović was to throw another grenade into the crowd immediately after Oreb's attack, in order to cause panic which would allow them to escape apprehension. When the King's car arrived at the center of the square, a group of children ran towards Alexander. Oreb was petrified after seeing the children, and Begović suggested that he throw a grenade at the military band behind the car, but Oreb refused. They left the square and started making new plans for the King's assassination.

On the same day, Herenčić left Zagreb while Oreb and Begović were joined by another Ustaša, Anton Podgorelac. During the night police found out where the three Ustašas were, and, at dawn, broke into Begović's apartment. Oreb fired two shots, killing one policeman and injuring another, after which he managed to escape. Podgorelac and Begović were taken into custody where they gave a detailed description of Oreb, who was caught by the police the same day, in Velika Gorica. After the interrogation of the three imprisoned Ustašas, Herenčić was implicated. Klagenfurt police attempted to determine whether Herenčić and other Ustaše were in Klagenfurt and were involved in the assassination plot. They managed to find out that Herenčić had met with Begović and Vladimir Singer in the autumn of 1933, and also that Herenčić was in Klagenfurt just before and after the assassination attempt. However, this was not enough to prove that Herečić had been involved.

Upon returning to Italy Herenčić continued to live and work in various Ustaše camps. He also continued to occasionally travel to Austria in order to complete different Ustaše missions, such as recruiting new members into the Ustaše, which gained him the nickname Konzul (English: Consul). In 1935, he became the commander of the 1st Ustaše Company, a paramilitary unit with a strength of 74 men, stationed on the Italian island of Lipari.

== World War II ==
Herenčić participated in a meeting in Pistoia on 10 April 1941, organized by the Ustaše leader (Poglavnik), Ante Pavelić, after the Ustaše received uniforms and weapons from the Italians following the news of initial German success in the invasion of Yugoslavia. On 11 April, while the invasion was still underway, Herenčić traveled together with Pavelić and other Ustašas to Trieste. The following morning Pavelić tasked Herenčić with traveling to Zagreb where he was supposed to meet with the Ustaše deputy leader, Slavko Kvaternik. Herenčić's mission to Zagreb was canceled after the Italian general Vittorio Ambrosio told Pavelić that the Ustašas could travel to Zagreb that day, as the Italian Army had reached Karlovac. After being provided with buses and automobiles in Trieste on the same day, Ustašas traveled towards Zagreb and they entered the city on 15 April.

After Pavelić arrived in Zagreb, he sent Herenčić along with Jure Francetić and Mijo Babić to Bosnia and Herzegovina to form Ustaše units and organizations. Herenčić participated in the suppression of the Serb uprising in eastern Herzegovina in June and early July 1941. Main Ustaša Headquarters sent Herenčić to Mostar in mid-July. A few days after he arrived, arrests and killings of Serbs and Jews began in the city. Between 19 July and 4 August 750 people were arrested in Mostar and sent to various concentration camps in the NDH. On 2 August, Herenčić ordered the establishment of the Jablanica concentration camp where, according to one witness, around 400 Serbs were detained. During the summer of 1941, Herenčić formed the Ustaše Mostar Battalion and became its first commander. His battalion committed various war crimes in the Mostar area, where it operated until 7 September when Italy took full control of the area. After this, the battalion traveled to the German occupation zone, where it continued to commit atrocities that disgusted even the high-ranking officials of the NDH. In November, Herenčić was promoted to the rank of major and soon after to lieutenant colonel. Later he was wounded while participating in fighting in Bosnia and Herzegovina.

In April 1941, Herenčić was appointed as a commissioner in RAVSIGUR, a supervisory department in the Ministry of Internal Affairs. In April 1942, the Chief Surveillance Department (Note: Croatian: Glavno nadzorništvo) was created and tasked with overseeing the work of the Ustaše Surveillance Service (UNS) (Note: Croatian: Ustaška nadzorna služba) and of the police. Herenčić was appointed its leader with Lieutenant Mirko Vutuc as his deputy. Herenčić remained in this position until August 1943, when he ordered the assassination of the Chief of Staff of the Croatian Home Guard, General Ivan Prpić, as he feared Prpić might reveal compromising information about him and other Ustaše Militia officers. The assassination failed and Herenčić had to flee to Hungary. He was brought back to Zagreb by RAVSIGUR in the spring of 1944 when he was tasked with uncovering the Lorković–Vokić plot against the NDH government. Herenčić was one of the most feared UNS and RAVSIGUR officers because of the atrocities previously committed by units under his command.

In mid-December 1944, Herenčić was promoted to the rank of general and in mid-March 1945, he was appointed commander of the newly formed 5th Ustaše Corps. Herenčić, along with two other generals, Vladimir Metikoš and Vjekoslav Servatzy, led the withdrawal of the Croatian Armed Forces towards Austria with the goal of surrendering to the advancing British. Once the lead elements of the fleeing columns reached Bleiburg just across the Austrian border on 14 May 1945 they were stopped by the British 38th (Irish) Brigade, commanded by Brigadier Patrick T.D. Scott. Herenčić, together with Metikoš, Servatzy and Danijel Crljen met with Scott on the same day. Scott decided that the NDH troops and the civilians accompanying them should not withdraw any further. On 15 May, Herenčić, Metikoš, Servatzy and Crljen, representing the retreating NDH forces, met with Scott and the Partisan representatives, Milan Basta and Ivan Kovačić-Efenka. During this meeting, it was decided that the NDH forces would have to surrender to the Partisans.

== Post-war life and death ==
Although he was not able to negotiate passage for the NDH forces and the accompanying civilians into Austria, Herenčić himself was able to escape into the countryside and make his way to Italy. He lived for a time in Rome near Porta Pia, working as an art dealer. Later he traveled to Argentina, where he died on 8 December 1978 in Buenos Aires, aged 68.

== Personal life ==
During World War II, Herenčić married Vera Javor, Ante Pavelić's secretary; she fled to Argentina with Herenčić. She died in Buenos Aires on 19 August 1991.
