= Žulja =

Žulja Жуља
- Village
- Location within Bosnia and Herzegovina
- Coordinates: 43°13′16″N 17°58′17″E
- Country: Bosnia and Herzegovina
- Entity: Federation of Bosnia and Herzegovina
- Canton: Herzegovina-Neretva
- Municipality: City of Mostar

Area
  - Total: 2.11 sq mi (5.47 km^{2})

Population (2013)
  - Total: 22
  - Density: 10/sq mi (4.0/km^{2})
- Time zone: UTC+1 (CET)
  - Summer (DST): UTC+2 (CEST)

Žulja (Serbian Cyrillic: Жуља) is a village in the City of Mostar, Bosnia and Herzegovina.

== Demographics ==
According to the 2013 census, its population was 22, all Bosniaks. Žulja used to be part of Nevesinje municipality but was moved over to Mostar.
