= Trusina =

Trusina may refer to the following places:

- Trusina (Konjic), village in the municipality of Konjic, Bosnia and Herzegovina
- Trusina, Nevesinje, village in the municipality of Nevesinje, Bosnia and Herzegovina
- Trusina, Berkovići, a village in the municipality of Berkovići, Bosnia and Herzegovina
