= Šipačno =

Šipačno may refer to:

- Šipačno, Nevesinje, a village in Bosnia and Herzegovina
- Šipačno, Nikšić, a village in Montenegro
