= Donji Lukavac =

Donji Lukavac may refer to the following places:

- Donji Lukavac, Gradačac
- Donji Lukavac, Nevesinje
