= June uprising =

June uprising might refer to:

- June Rebellion, anti-monarchist uprising of Parisian workers and students from June 5 to June 6, 1832 which is the basis for Les Misérables
- June Days uprising, French workers' revolt from June 23 to June 25, 1848
- Łódź insurrection, uprising in 1905 by Polish workers in Łódź against the Russian Empire
- Uprising in June 1923, Bulgaria by the Bulgarian Agrarian People's Union after the Stambolisky's government was overthrown in a coup d'état.
- June 1941 uprising in eastern Herzegovina in the Independent State of Croatia, which was established on the territory of the defeated Kingdom of Yugoslavia.
- June Uprising in Lithuania, uprising by Lithuanians against the retreating Red Army in 1941
- East German uprising of 1953 against the Stalinist German Democratic Republic
- June Democratic Struggle, 1987 protests in South Korea
- June 2025 Los Angeles rebellion, protests during which the California National Guard was federalized by President Trump, and Marines deployed to the city.
