= Gornji Lukavac, Nevesinje =

Gornji Lukavac Горњи Лукавац
- Village
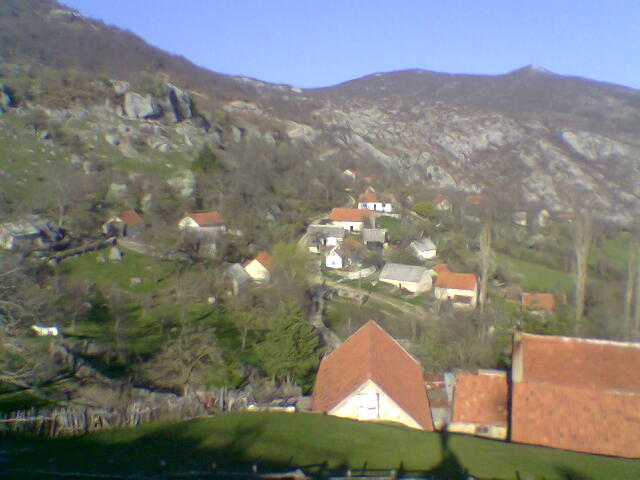
- A view of Gornji Lukavac

- Location within Bosnia and Herzegovina
- Coordinates: 43°07′22″N 18°16′58″E
- Country: Bosnia and Herzegovina
- Entity: Republika Srpska
- Municipality: Nevesinje
- Time zone: UTC+1 (CET)
  - Summer (DST): UTC+2 (CEST)

Gornji Lukavac (Serbian Cyrillic: Горњи Лукавац) is a village in the municipality of Nevesinje, Republika Srpska, Bosnia and Herzegovina.

== History ==
The capture of the gendarmerie post in Gornji Lukavac was one of the first actions of the June 1941 uprising in eastern Herzegovina.
