= Miljevac, Bosnia and Herzegovina =

Miljevac Миљевац
- Village
- Location within Bosnia and Herzegovina
- Coordinates: 43°15′07″N 18°07′42″E
- Country: Bosnia and Herzegovina
- Entity: Republika Srpska
- Municipality: Nevesinje

Population (1991)
  - Total: 390
- Time zone: UTC+1 (CET)
  - Summer (DST): UTC+2 (CEST)

Miljevac (Serbian Cyrillic: Миљевац) is a village in the municipality of Nevesinje, Republika Srpska, Bosnia and Herzegovina.
