= Hrušta =

Hrušta Хрушта
- Village
- Location within Bosnia and Herzegovina
- Coordinates: 43°21′26″N 18°05′05″E
- Country: Bosnia and Herzegovina
- Entity: Republika Srpska; Federation of Bosnia and Herzegovina
- Canton: Herzegovina-Neretva
- Municipality: Nevesinje; City of Mostar

Area
  - Total: 35.51 km^{2} (13.71 sq mi)

Population (2013)
  - Total: 158
  - Density: 4.45/km^{2} (11.5/sq mi)
- Time zone: UTC+1 (CET)
  - Summer (DST): UTC+2 (CEST)

Hrušta (Serbian Cyrillic: Хрушта) is a village in the municipality of Nevesinje, Republika Srpska and for a small part also in the City of Mostar, Bosnia and Herzegovina.

== Demographics ==
According to the 2013 census, its population was 158, all Bosniaks living in the Nevesinje municipality and none in the Mostar municipality.
