= Kovačići, Nevesinje =

Kovačići Ковачићи
- Village
- Location within Bosnia and Herzegovina
- Coordinates: 43°22′12″N 18°07′48″E
- Country: Bosnia and Herzegovina
- Entity: Republika Srpska
- Municipality: Nevesinje
- Time zone: UTC+1 (CET)
  - Summer (DST): UTC+2 (CEST)

Kovačići (Serbian Cyrillic: Ковачићи) is a village in the municipality of Nevesinje, Republika Srpska, Bosnia and Herzegovina.
