= Bežđeđe =

Bežđeđe Бежђеђе
- Village
- Location within Bosnia and Herzegovina
- Coordinates: 43°07′15″N 18°13′42″E
- Country: Bosnia and Herzegovina
- Entity: Republika Srpska
- Municipality: Nevesinje
- Time zone: UTC+1 (CET)
  - Summer (DST): UTC+2 (CEST)

Bežđeđe (Serbian Cyrillic: Бежђеђе) is a village in the municipality of Nevesinje, Republika Srpska, Bosnia and Herzegovina.
