= Gornji Drežanj =

Gornji Drežanj Горњи Дрежањ
- Village
- Location within Bosnia and Herzegovina
- Coordinates: 43°10′44″N 18°15′38″E
- Country: Bosnia and Herzegovina
- Entity: Republika Srpska
- Municipality: Nevesinje
- Time zone: UTC+1 (CET)
  - Summer (DST): UTC+2 (CEST)

Gornji Drežanj (Serbian Cyrillic: Горњи Дрежањ) is a village in the municipality of Nevesinje, Republika Srpska, Bosnia and Herzegovina.
