= Podgrađe, Nevesinje =

Podgrađe Подграђе
- Village
- Location within Bosnia and Herzegovina
- Coordinates: 43°11′56″N 18°18′59″E
- Country: Bosnia and Herzegovina
- Entity: Republika Srpska
- Municipality: Nevesinje
- Time zone: UTC+1 (CET)
  - Summer (DST): UTC+2 (CEST)

Podgrađe (Serbian Cyrillic: Подграђе) is a village in the municipality of Nevesinje, Republika Srpska, Bosnia and Herzegovina.
