= Kljen =

Kljen Кљен
- Village
- Location within Bosnia and Herzegovina
- Coordinates: 43°08′N 18°15′E
- Country: Bosnia and Herzegovina
- Entity: Republika Srpska
- Municipality: Nevesinje
- Time zone: UTC+1 (CET)
  - Summer (DST): UTC+2 (CEST)

Kljen (Serbian Cyrillic: Кљен) is a village in the municipality of Nevesinje, Republika Srpska, Bosnia and Herzegovina.
