= Krekovi =

Krekovi Крекови
- Village
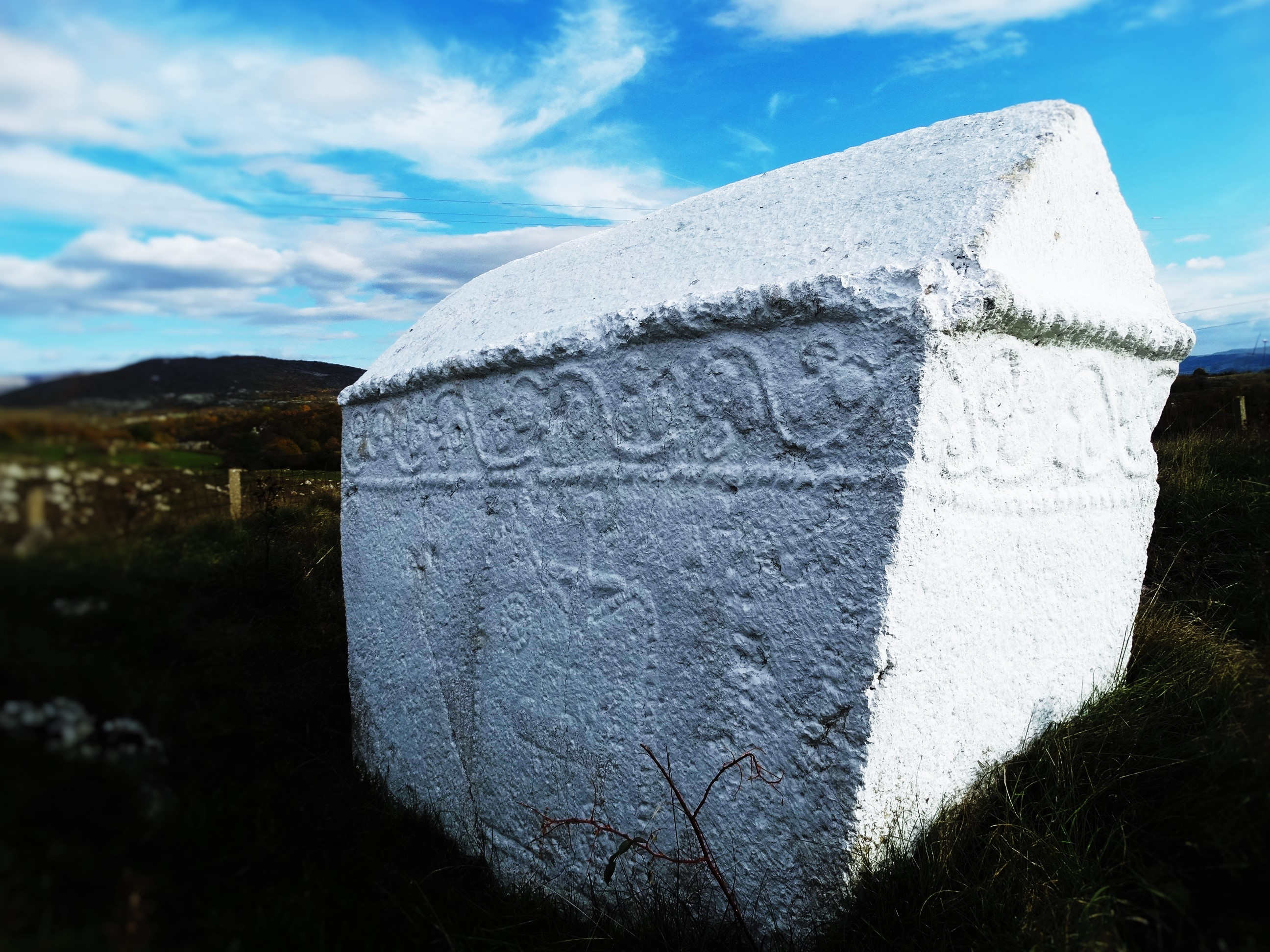
- Medieval stećak in Krekovi

- Location within Bosnia and Herzegovina
- Coordinates: 43°18′N 18°12′E
- Country: Bosnia and Herzegovina
- Entity: Republika Srpska
- Municipality: Nevesinje
- Time zone: UTC+1 (CET)
  - Summer (DST): UTC+2 (CEST)

Krekovi (Serbian Cyrillic: Крекови) is a village in the municipality of Nevesinje, Republika Srpska, Bosnia and Herzegovina. Every village in the Nevesinje municipality contains a number of stećak tombstones, while the village of Krekovi has the most medieval necropolises in Bosnia and Herzegovina.[2]

The site of Kalufi stećak necropolis in Krekovi is included in the UNESCO World Heritage list.
