= Grabovica, Nevesinje =

Grabovica Грабовица
- Village
- Location within Bosnia and Herzegovina
- Coordinates: 43°12′02.00″N 18°14′51.00″E
- Country: Bosnia and Herzegovina
- Entity: Republika Srpska
- Municipality: Nevesinje
- Time zone: UTC+1 (CET)
  - Summer (DST): UTC+2 (CEST)

Grabovica (Serbian Cyrillic: Грабовица) is a village in the municipality of Nevesinje, Republika Srpska, Bosnia and Herzegovina.
