= Rabina, Nevesinje =

Rabina Рабина
- Village
- Location within Bosnia and Herzegovina
- Country: Bosnia and Herzegovina
- Entity: Republika Srpska
- Municipality: Nevesinje

Area
  - Total: 23.68 km^{2} (9.14 sq mi)

Population (2013)
  - Total: 23
  - Density: 0.97/km^{2} (2.5/sq mi)
- Time zone: UTC+1 (CET)
  - Summer (DST): UTC+2 (CEST)

Rabina (Serbian Cyrillic: Рабина) is a village, partly in the municipality of Nevesinje, Republika Srpska, an entity of Bosnia and Herzegovina.

== Demographics ==
According to the 2013 census, its population was 23.

Ethnicity in 2013
Ethnicity	Number	Percentage
Bosniaks	2	8.70%
Serbs	19	82.61%
other/undeclared	2	8.70%
Total	23	100%
