= Sopilja =

Coordinates: 43°19′58″N 18°05′29″E

Sopila Сопиља
- Village
- Location within Republika Srpska
- Country: Bosnia and Herzegovina
- Entity: Republika Srpska
- Municipality: Nevesinje
- Time zone: UTC+1 (CET)
  - Summer (DST): UTC+2 (CEST)

Sopila (Serbian Cyrillic: Сопиља) is a village in the municipality of Nevesinje, Republika Srpska, Bosnia and Herzegovina.
