= Jugovići, Nevesinje =

Jugovići Југовићи
- Village
- Location within Bosnia and Herzegovina
- Coordinates: 43°07′43″N 18°15′51″E
- Country: Bosnia and Herzegovina
- Entity: Republika Srpska
- Municipality: Nevesinje
- Time zone: UTC+1 (CET)
  - Summer (DST): UTC+2 (CEST)

Jugovići (Serbian Cyrillic: Југовићи) is a village in the municipality of Nevesinje, Republika Srpska, Bosnia and Herzegovina.
