= Luka, Nevesinje =

Coordinates: 43°14′05″N 18°17′37″E

Luka Лука
- Village
- Location within Republika Srpska
- Country: Bosnia and Herzegovina
- Entity: Republika Srpska
- Municipality: Nevesinje
- Time zone: UTC+1 (CET)
  - Summer (DST): UTC+2 (CEST)

Luka (Serbian Cyrillic: Лука) is a small village in the municipality of Nevesinje, Republika Srpska, Bosnia and Herzegovina.
