= Bratač =

Bratač Братач
- Village
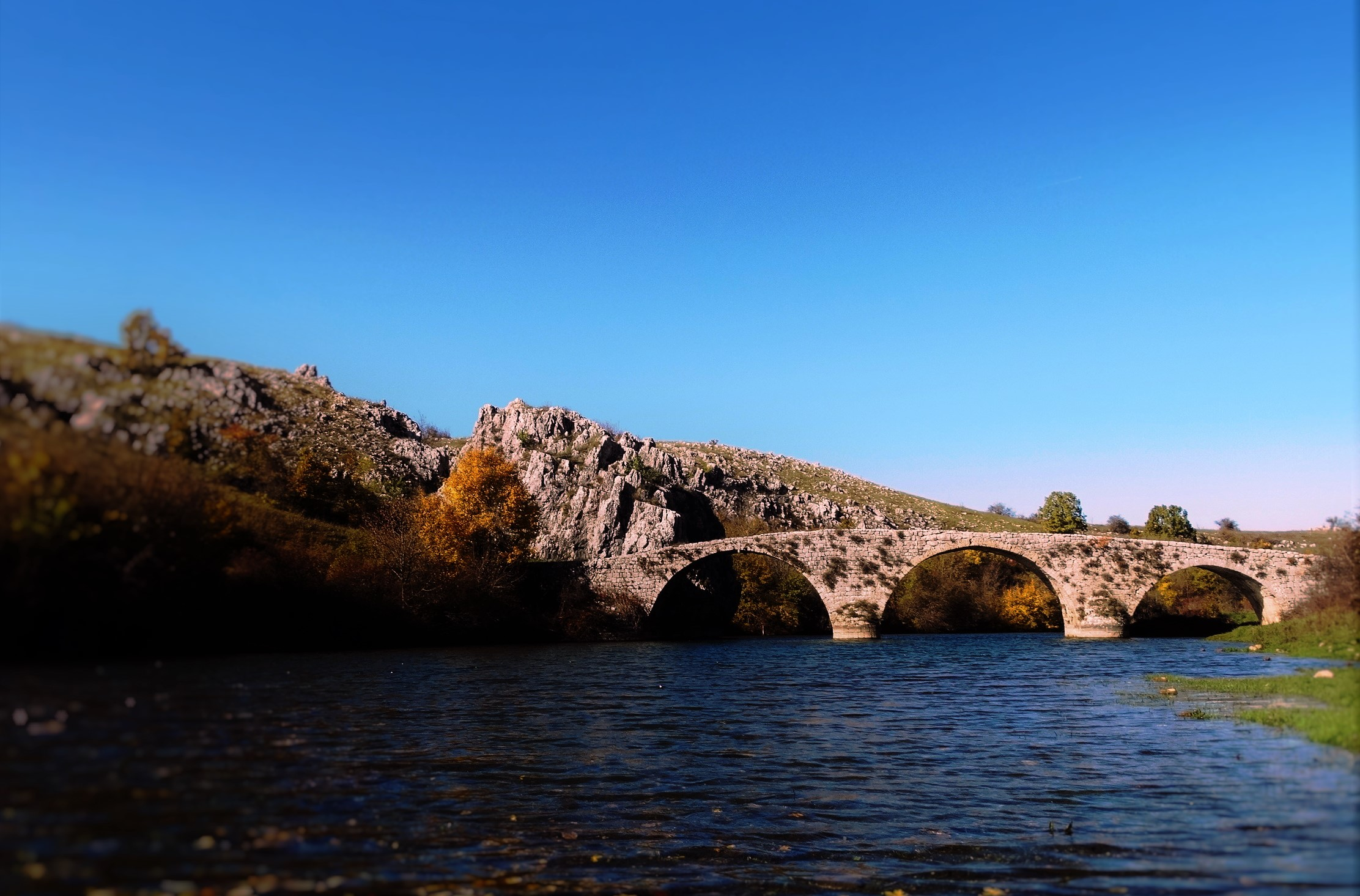
- Ovčiji brod bridge in Bratač

- Location within Bosnia and Herzegovina
- Coordinates: 43°15′50″N 18°13′30″E
- Country: Bosnia and Herzegovina
- Entity: Republika Srpska
- Municipality: Nevesinje
- Time zone: UTC+1 (CET)
  - Summer (DST): UTC+2 (CEST)

Bratač (Serbian Cyrillic: Братач) is a village in the municipality of Nevesinje, Republika Srpska, Bosnia and Herzegovina.
