= Gornja Bijenja =

Gornja Bijenja Горња Бијења
- Village
- Location within Bosnia and Herzegovina
- Coordinates: 43°20′08″N 18°11′21″E
- Country: Bosnia and Herzegovina
- Entity: Republika Srpska
- Municipality: Nevesinje
- Time zone: UTC+1 (CET)
  - Summer (DST): UTC+2 (CEST)

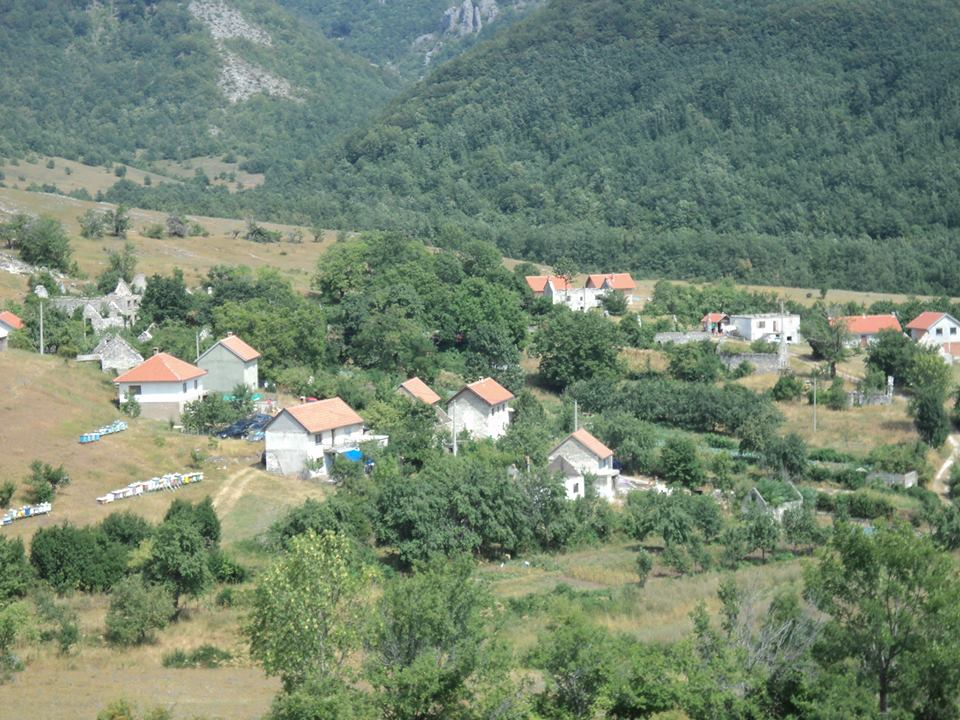
Gornja Bijenja village

Gornja Bijenja (Serbian Cyrillic: Горња Бијења) is a village in the municipality of Nevesinje, Republika Srpska, Bosnia and Herzegovina.
