= Batkovići, Nevesinje =

Batkovići Батковићи
- Village
- Location within Bosnia and Herzegovina
- Coordinates: 43°15′51″N 18°09′19″E
- Country: Bosnia and Herzegovina
- Entity: Republika Srpska
- Municipality: Nevesinje
- Time zone: UTC+1 (CET)
  - Summer (DST): UTC+2 (CEST)

Batkovići (Serbian Cyrillic: Батковићи) is a village in the municipality of Nevesinje, Republika Srpska, Bosnia and Herzegovina.
