= Zovi Do =

Zovi Do Зови До
- Village
- Location within Bosnia and Herzegovina
- Coordinates: 43°09′26″N 18°12′45″E
- Country: Bosnia and Herzegovina
- Entity: Republika Srpska
- Municipality: Nevesinje
- Time zone: UTC+1 (CET)
  - Summer (DST): UTC+2 (CEST)

Zovi Do (Serbian Cyrillic: Зови До) is a village in the municipality of Nevesinje, Republika Srpska, Bosnia and Herzegovina.

Hollywood actor Brad Dexter's parents are originally from Zovi Do and emigrated to the United States.
