= Crvanj =

Mountain in Bosnia and Herzegovina

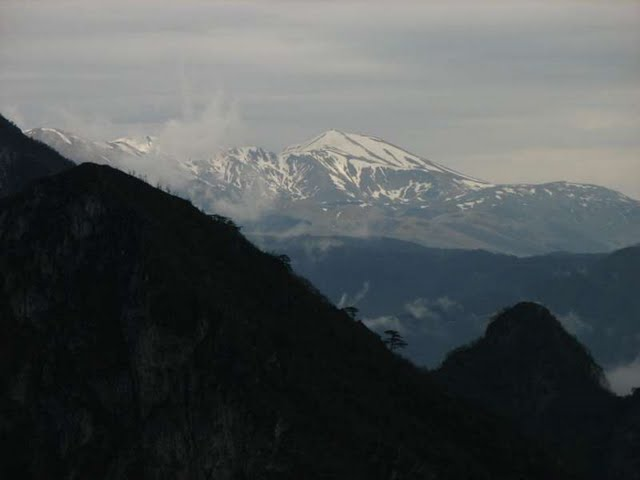

Highest point
- Elevation: 1,921 m (6,302 ft)
- Coordinates: 43°22′55″N 18°10′30″E

Geography
- Location within Bosnia and Herzegovina
- Location: Bosnia and Herzegovina
- Parent range: Dinaric Alps

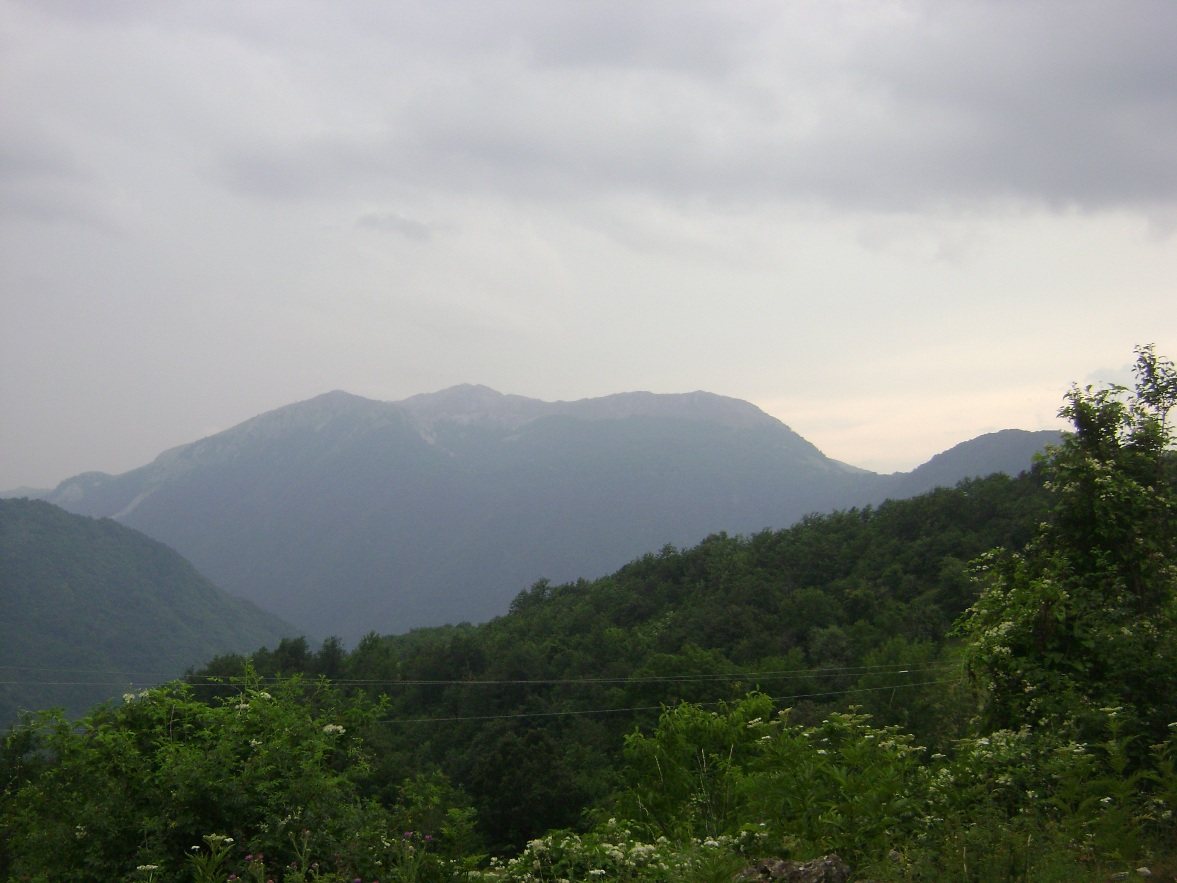
Crvanj

Crvanj (Serbian Cyrillic: Црвањ) is a mountain of the Dinaric Alps located in the municipalities of Nevesinje, Konjic and Kalinovik in Bosnia and Herzegovina. Its highest peak, Zimomor, is at an altitude of 1,921 metres (6,302 ft).

== See also ==
- List of mountains in Bosnia and Herzegovina
