= Šipačno, Nevesinje =

Šipačno Шипачно
- Village
- Location within Bosnia and Herzegovina
- Coordinates: 43°10′10″N 18°21′05″E
- Country: Bosnia and Herzegovina
- Entity: Republika Srpska
- Municipality: Nevesinje
- Time zone: UTC+1 (CET)
  - Summer (DST): UTC+2 (CEST)

Šipačno (Serbian Cyrillic: Шипачно) is a village in the municipality of Nevesinje, Republika Srpska, Bosnia and Herzegovina. It is a rural, sparsely populated village in eastern Herzegovina within the Nevesinje region, known for its karst landscapes, agriculture, and traditional lifestyle.
