= Donji Lukavac, Nevesinje =

Donji Lukavac Доњи Лукавац
- Village
- Location within Bosnia and Herzegovina
- Coordinates: 43°06′43″N 18°17′53″E
- Country: Bosnia and Herzegovina
- Entity: Republika Srpska
- Municipality: Nevesinje
- Time zone: UTC+1 (CET)
  - Summer (DST): UTC+2 (CEST)

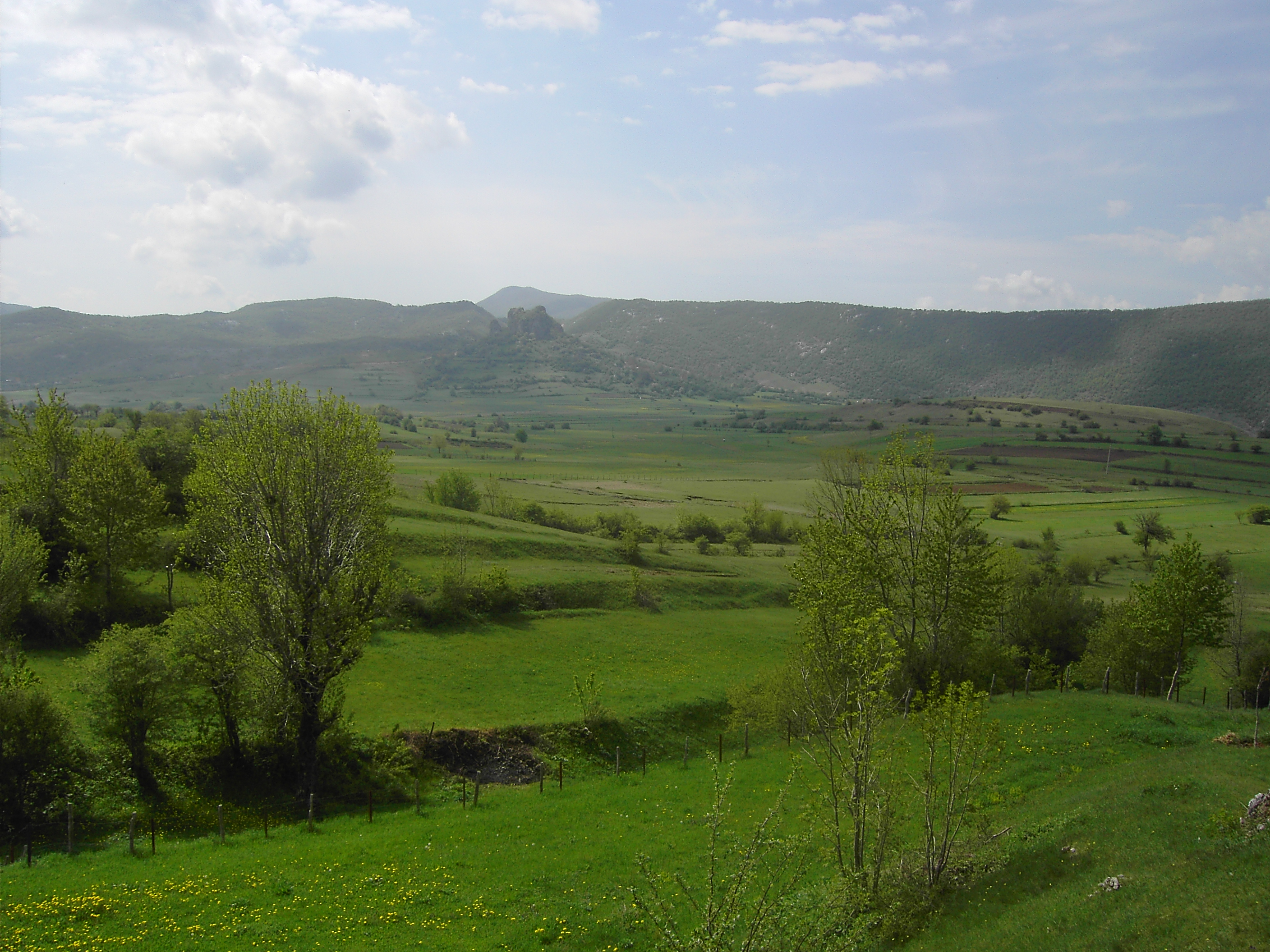
Donji Lukavac

Donji Lukavac (Serbian Cyrillic: Доњи Лукавац) is a village in the municipality of Nevesinje, Republika Srpska, Bosnia and Herzegovina.
