= Ivan Prpić (soldier) =

Croatian infantry general

Ivan Prpić (12 March 1887 – 10 January 1967, Zagreb) was a Croatian infantry general of the Croatian Home Guard and its chief of staff from 1942 to 1943. He received the Military Order of the Iron Trefoil in 1942.

In August 1943 there was an assassination attempt on Prpić. Some sources allege that it was organized by Ivo Herenčić, and partly motivated by personal rivalry.

In 1944 Prpić retired and moved with his family to the Slovak Republic, and later to Prague in the reestablished Czechoslovakia. He was arrested by the British there in August 1945 and taken back to Yugoslavia. After questioning in Belgrade and Zagreb he was released in October.

Prpić was one of few generals of the Independent State of Croatia not to be sentenced by the communist regime in Yugoslavia, and was interred at Mirogoj cemetery.

== Bibliography ==
- Jelinović, Zvonimir (1995). "Hrvatska vojska (domobranstvo) i obrana" (PDF). Časopis za suvremenu povijest (in Croatian). 27 (3). Zagreb: Croatian Institute of History: 569–583.
