= Donji Drežanj =

Donji Drežanj Доњи Дрежањ
- Village
- Location within Bosnia and Herzegovina
- Coordinates: 43°11′25″N 18°13′50″E
- Country: Bosnia and Herzegovina
- Entity: Republika Srpska
- Municipality: Nevesinje
- Time zone: UTC+1 (CET)
  - Summer (DST): UTC+2 (CEST)

Donji Drežanj (Serbian Cyrillic: Доњи Дрежањ) is a village in the municipality of Nevesinje, Republika Srpska, Bosnia and Herzegovina.
