= Donja Bijenja =

Donja Bijenja Доња Бијења
- Village
- Location within Bosnia and Herzegovina
- Coordinates: 43°20′N 18°10′E
- Country: Bosnia and Herzegovina
- Entity: Republika Srpska
- Municipality: Nevesinje
- Time zone: UTC+1 (CET)
  - Summer (DST): UTC+2 (CEST)

Donja Bijenja (Serbian Cyrillic: Доња Бијења) is a village in the municipality of Nevesinje, Republika Srpska, Bosnia and Herzegovina.
