= Kruševljani =

Kruševljani Крушевљани
- Village
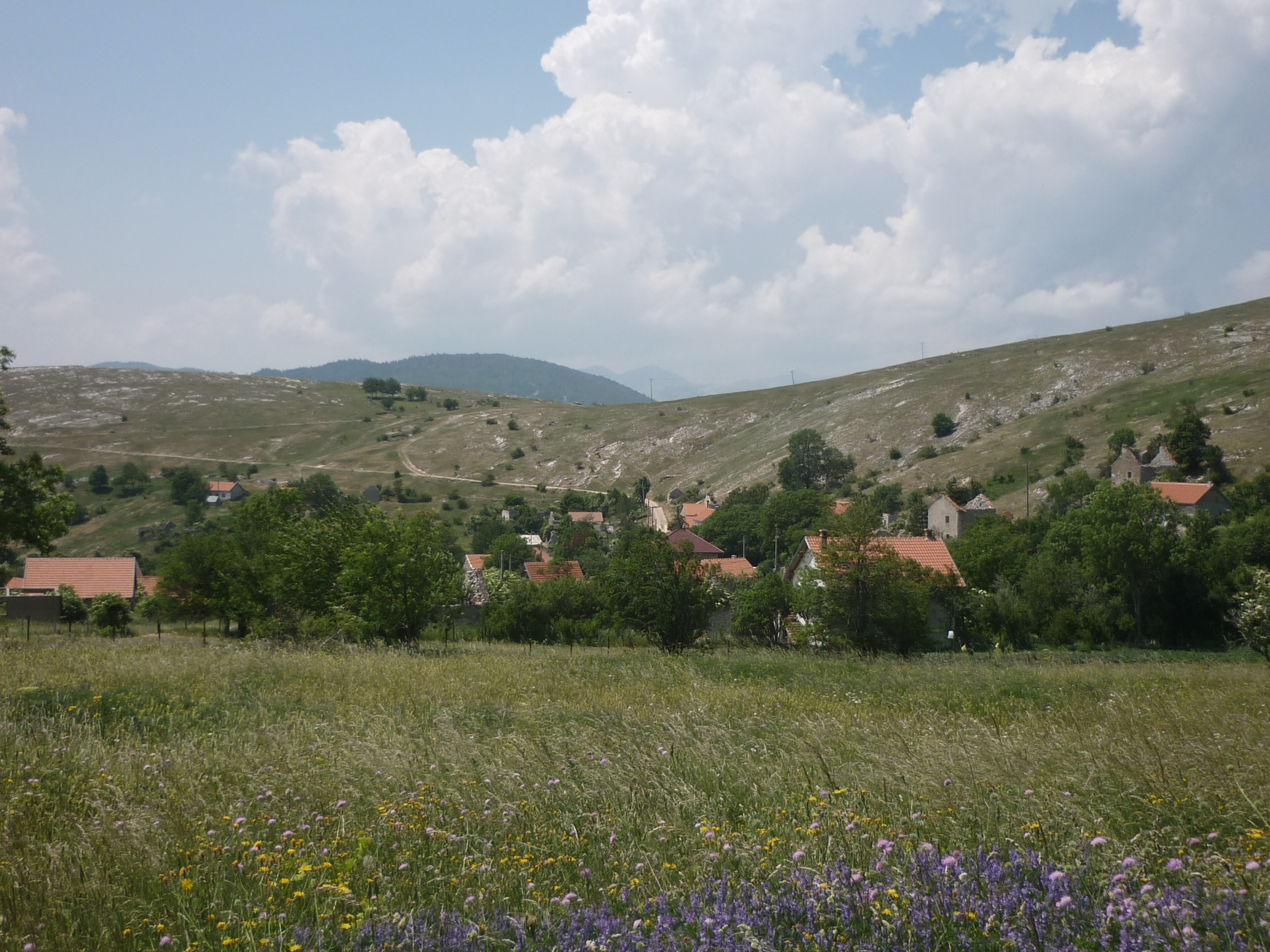

- Location within Bosnia and Herzegovina
- Coordinates: 43°26′N 18°09′E
- Country: Bosnia and Herzegovina
- Entity: Republika Srpska
- Municipality: Nevesinje
- Time zone: UTC+1 (CET)
  - Summer (DST): UTC+2 (CEST)

Kruševljani (Serbian Cyrillic: Крушевљани) is a village in the municipality of Nevesinje, Republika Srpska, Bosnia and Herzegovina.

According to local folklore, the village is the site where the Green Flare, a mythological weapon, was put out.
