= Kifino Selo =

Kifino Selo Кифино Село
- Village
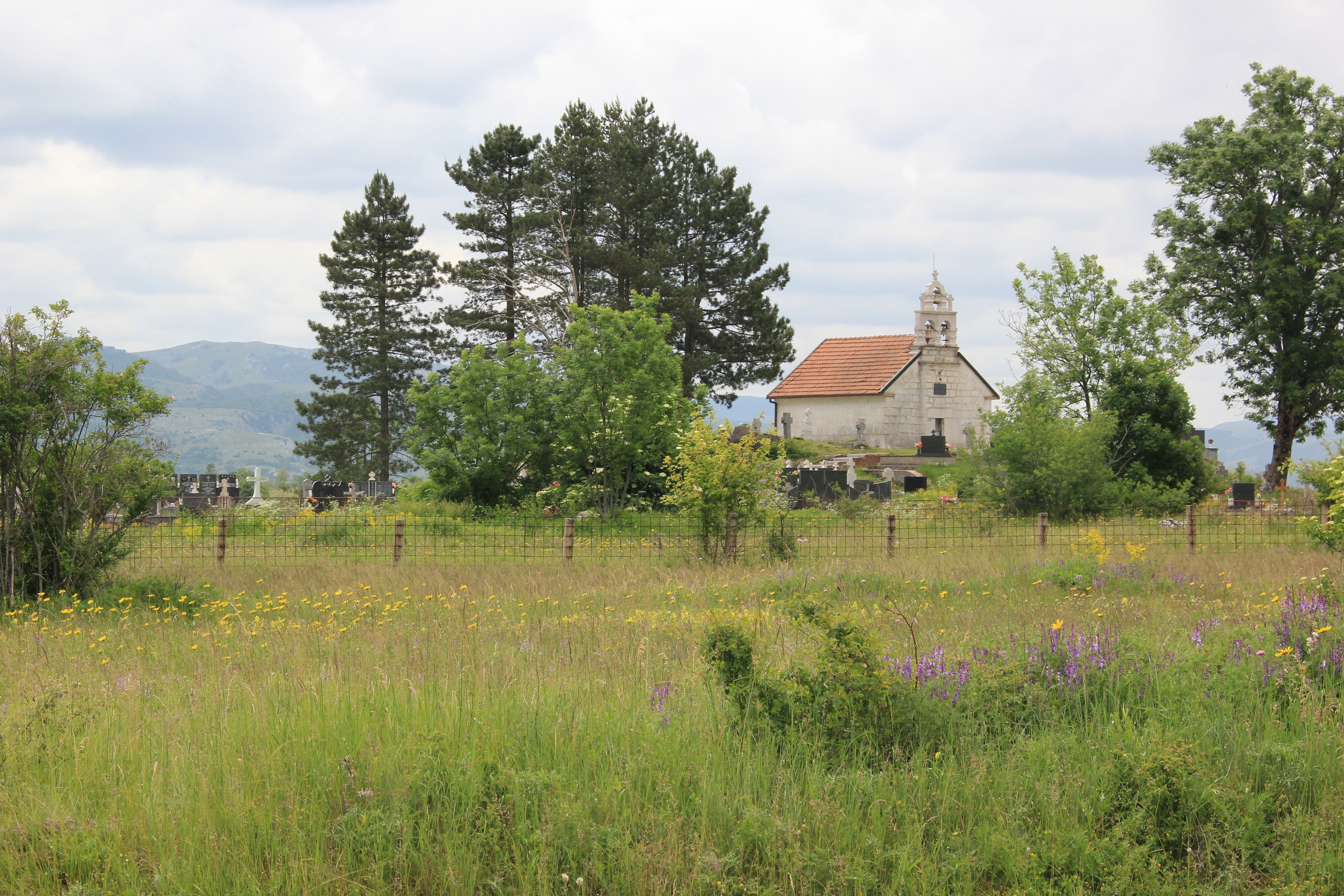
- Trinity church in Kifino Selo

- Location within Bosnia and Herzegovina
- Coordinates: 43°17′N 18°12′E
- Country: Bosnia and Herzegovina
- Entity: Republika Srpska
- Municipality: Nevesinje
- Time zone: UTC+1 (CET)
  - Summer (DST): UTC+2 (CEST)

Kifino Selo (Serbian Cyrillic: Кифино Село) is a village in the municipality of Nevesinje, Republika Srpska, Bosnia and Herzegovina.
