= Nevesinje =

Nevesinje Невесиње
- Town
- Nevesinje

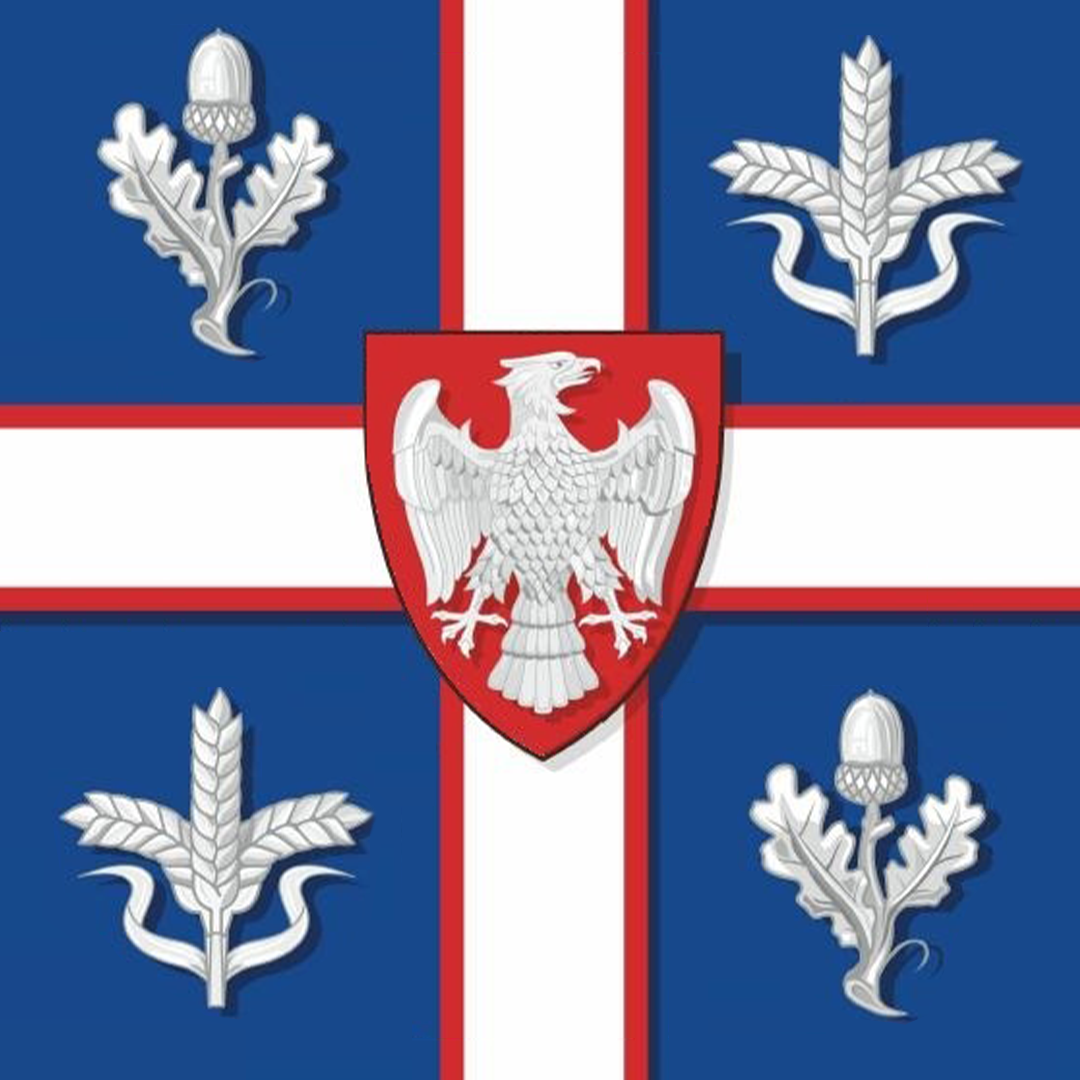
- Flag Coat of arms

- Location of Nevesinje within Bosnia and Herzegovina

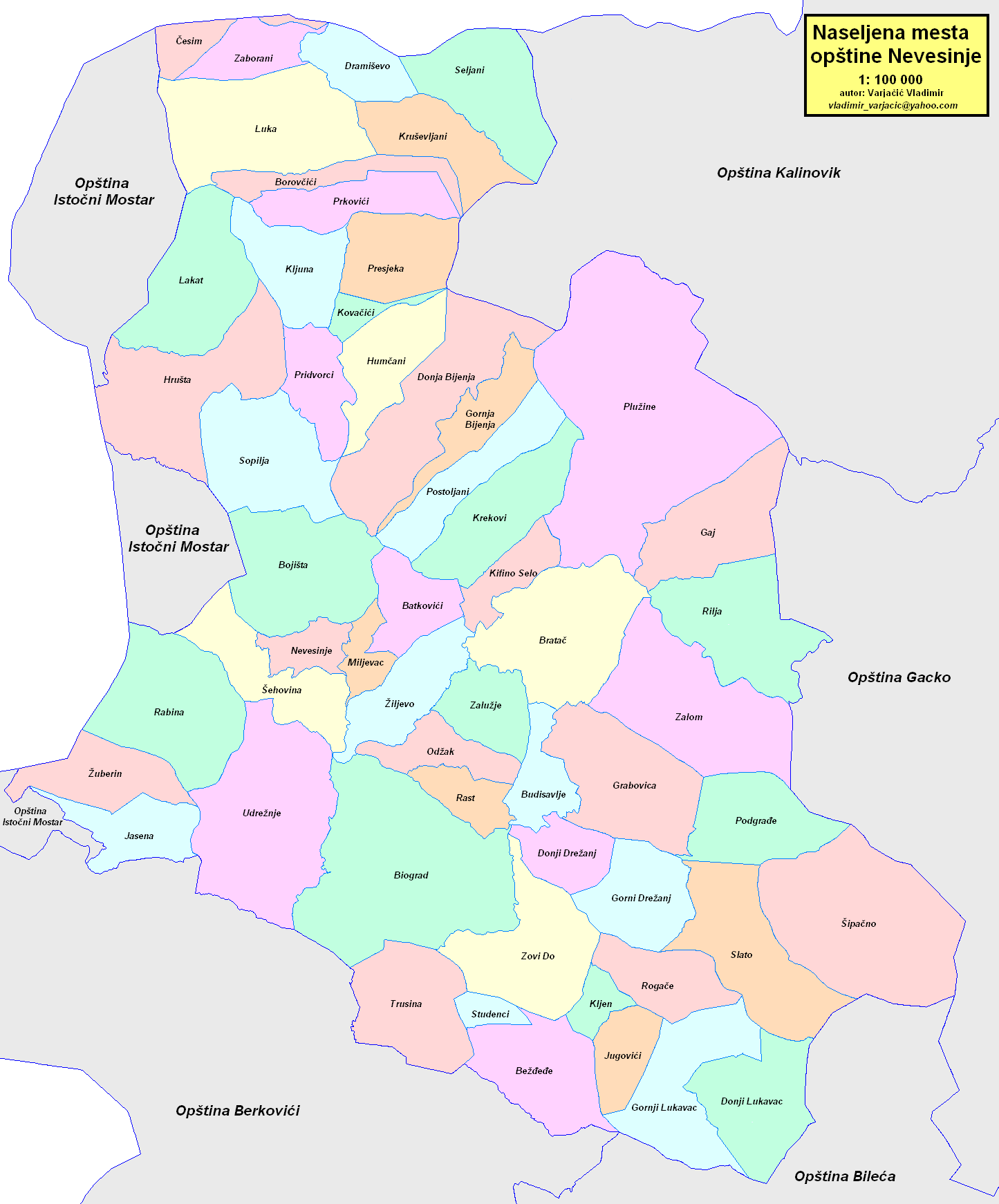
- Coordinates: 43°15′30″N 18°6′48″E
- Country: Bosnia and Herzegovina
- Entity: Republika Srpska
- Geographical region: Herzegovina
- Boroughs: 56 (as of 1991)

Government
  - Municipal mayor: Milenko Avdalović (SNSD)
  - Municipality: 923.04 km^{2} (356.39 sq mi)

Population (2013 census)
  - Town: 5,162
  - Municipality: 12,961
  - Municipality density: 14.042/km^{2} (36.368/sq mi)
- Time zone: UTC+1 (CET)
  - Summer (DST): UTC+2 (CEST)
- Area code: 59
- Website: opstinanevesinje.rs.ba/cir/

Nevesinje (Serbian Cyrillic: Невесиње) is a town and municipality in Republika Srpska, Bosnia and Herzegovina. As of 2013, the town has a population of 5,162 inhabitants, while the municipality has 12,961 inhabitants.

== Geography ==
The municipality of Nevesinje covers 1,040 km^{2} (402 sq mi) and is located in the south of Bosnia and Herzegovina. A large polje called Nevesinjsko polje dominates the municipality, and is encircled by the mountains of Crvanj to the north and northeast, Prenj to the northwest, and Velež to the south and southwest. The entire municipality, as well as the entire region of eastern Herzegovina beyond municipal borders, has an average elevation of 860 metres (2,820 ft) above sea level.

== History ==
Annals of the Patriarchal Monastery of Peć mentioned Nevesinje in 1219, which is the earliest mention of Nevesinje in preserved historical sources. The župa (county) of Nevesinje was held by Serbian prince Stefan Konstantin between 1303–06.

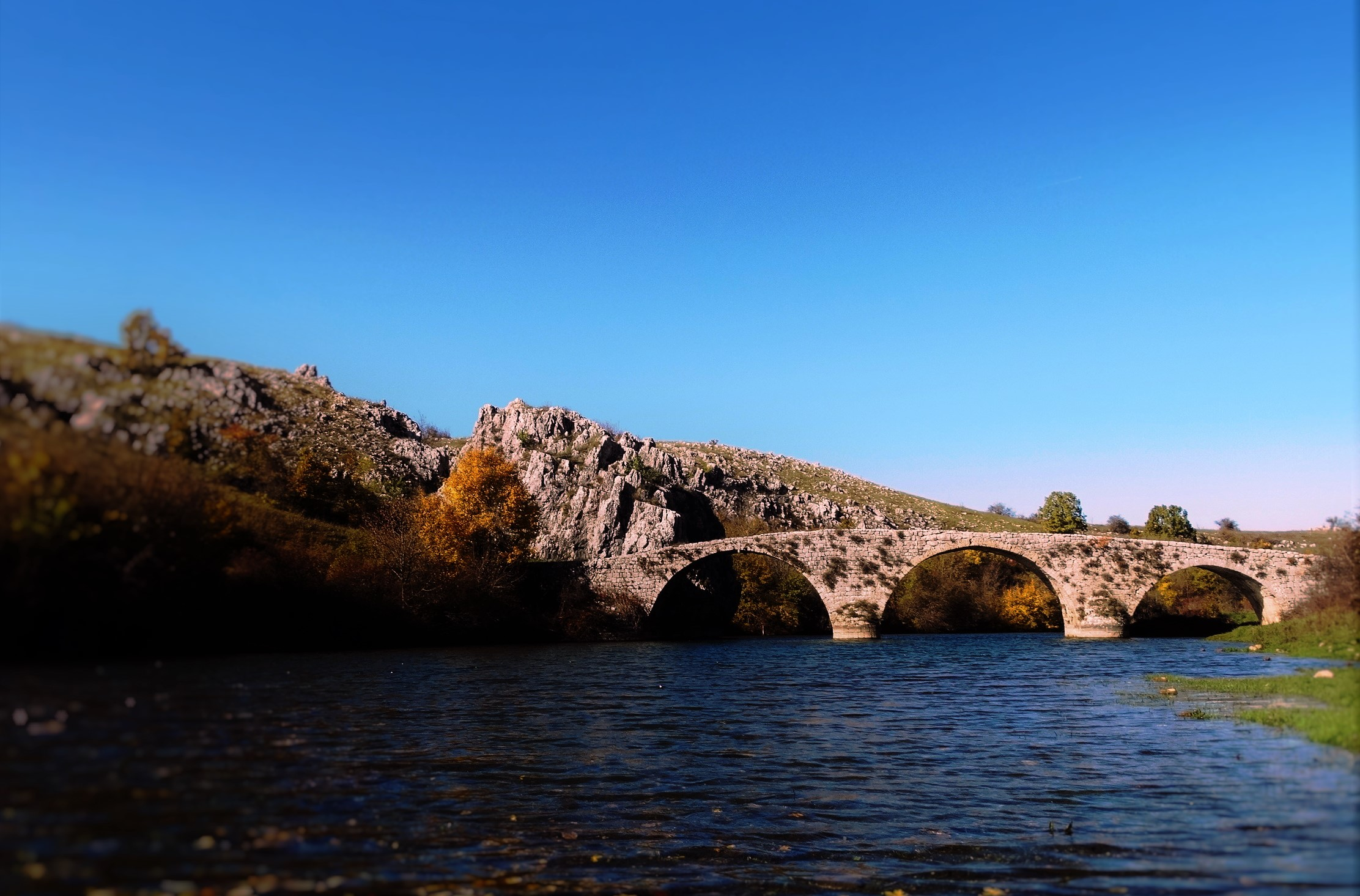
Ovči brod

The Chronicle of the Priest of Duklja mentions Nevesinje in the 12th century, as a part of the Podgorica župa.

Numerous contracts between craftsmen and other service providers from modern-day Nevesinje and the Republic of Dubrovnik are stored in the Dubrovnik archives.

The Nevesinje area was the scene of numerous robberies and crimes in the Middle ages, which has been recorded several times in the Dubrovnik archives.

The region was under the rule of different medieval lords until the end of the 15th century. The most significant ruler of Nevesinje from this period was Bosnian nobleman Stjepan Vukčić Kosača, known as Herceg Stefan. The land of Herzegovina is named after him. His lands were under constant threat from advancing Ottoman forces in the 15th century. Herzegovina, and thus Nevesinje were gradually incorporated into the Ottoman Empire by the first quarter of the 15th century (1422).

There is a large number of stećak tombstones in the Nevesinje area. Every village in the Nevesinje municipality contains a number of stećak tombstones, while the village of Krekovi has the most medieval necropolises in Bosnia and Herzegovina. The site of Kalufi stećak necropolis in Krekovi is included in the UNESCO World Heritage list.

In 1463, the Ottoman headquarters was established in the vicinity of Nevesinje. Within a few years they had conquered and placed under their administration the whole župa.

The Ottomans conducted a census of the villages, first from 1468 to 1469 and then from 1475 to 1477. Most of the villages mentioned in the Middle Ages bear the same names to this day. The voluntary conversion of part of the population to Islam has also been noticed, most likely due to high taxes and other levies.

Under the Ottoman Empire, Nevesinje was mostly part of the Bosnian Pashaluk and was a seat of the qadi. The Great Eastern Crisis was ignited in Nevesinje, with the outbreak of the Herzegovinian rebellion of 1875–78 when Serbs of the region rebelled against Ottoman tax collectors. The rebellion soon spread to the rest of Herzegovina, Bosnia, then other parts of the Ottoman Empire.

Neighboring states, Serbia, Montenegro and Bulgaria got involved in the conflict which in turn pulled in great powers of the time. The conflict ended with the Congress of Berlin in 1878 and the vilayet of Bosnia and Herzegovina was placed under the administration of Austria-Hungary. At the same time Romania, Serbia and Montenegro were declared independent principalities.

When the German and Italian Zones of Influence were revised on 24 June 1942, Nevesinje fell in Zone II, administered civilly by Croatia but militarily by Italy.

In 2019, Nevesinje experienced a power outage that was considered one of the worst crises in Bosnia and Herzegovina.

== Settlements ==
Aside from the town of Nevesinje itself, there are 55 other settlements that comprise the municipality:

- Batkovići
- Bežđeđe
- Biograd
- Bojišta
- Borovčići
- Bratač
- Budisavlje
- Ćesim
- Donja Bijenja
- Donji Drežanj
- Donji Lukavac
- Dramiševo
- Gaj
- Gornja Bijenja
- Gornji Drežanj
- Gornji Lukavac
- Grabovica
- Hrušta
- Humčani
- Jasena
- Jugovići
- Kifino Selo
- Kljen
- Kljuna
- Kovačići
- Krekovi
- Kruševljani
- Lakat
- Luka
- Miljevac
- Odžak
- Plužine
- Podgrađe
- Postoljani
- Presjeka
- Pridvorci
- Prkovići
- Rabina
- Rast
- Rilja
- Rogače
- Seljani
- Slato
- Sopilja
- Studenci
- Šehovina
- Šipačno
- Trusina
- Udrežnje
- Zaborani
- Zalom
- Zalužje
- Zovi Do
- Žiljevo
- Žuberin

== Demographics ==
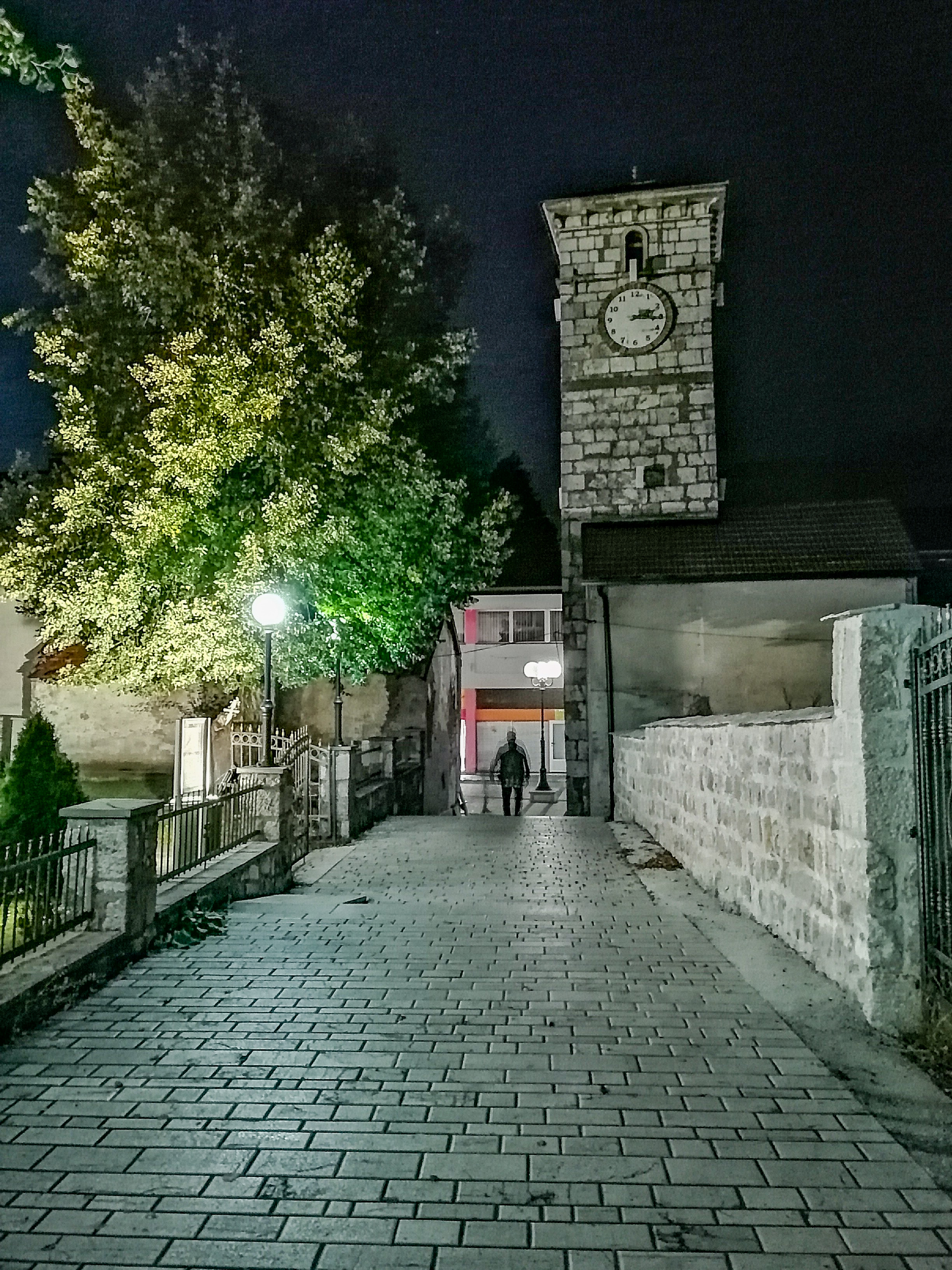
The clock tower is one of the symbols of Nevesinje

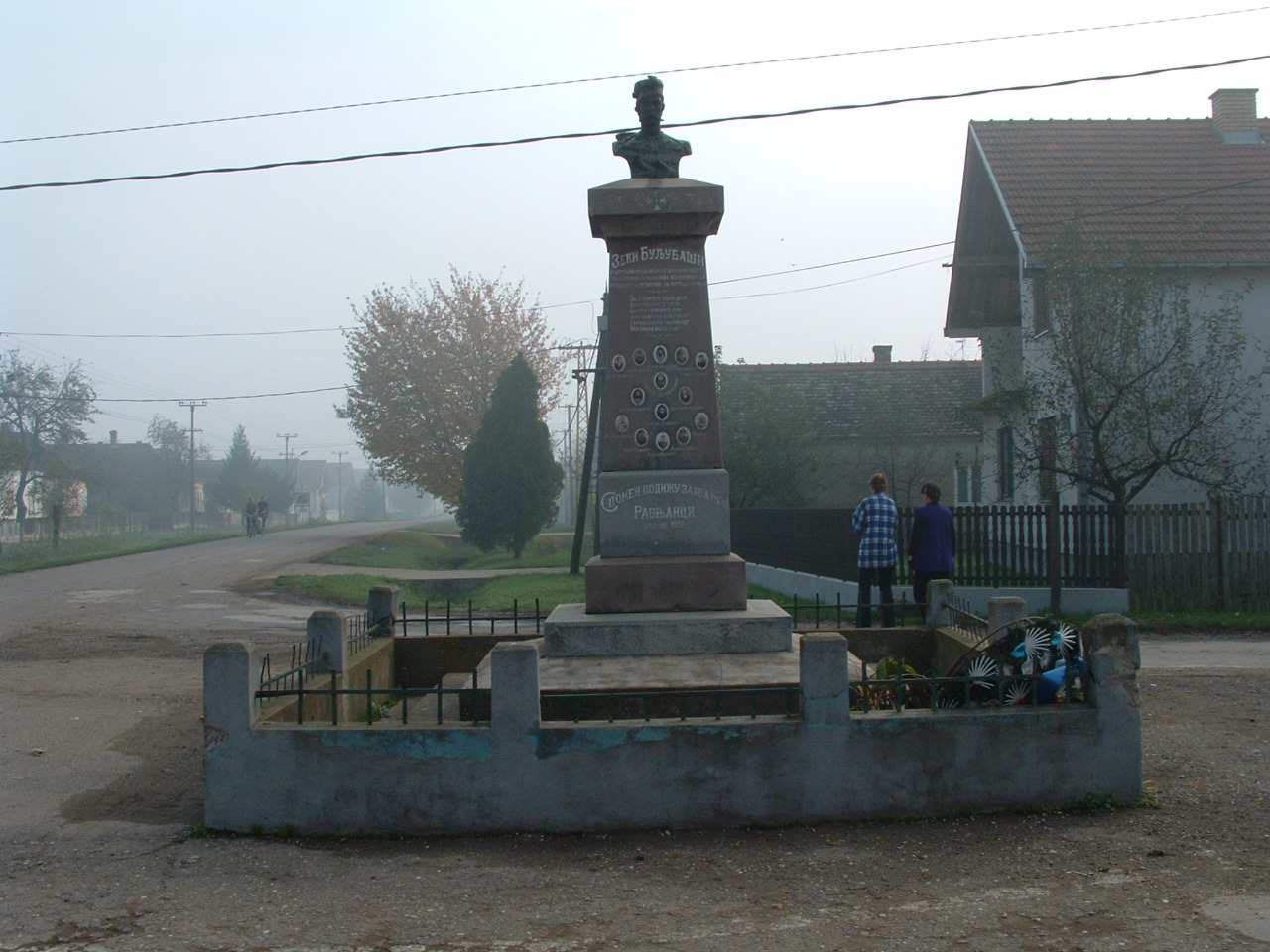
A monument to Zeka Buljubaša in Ravnje

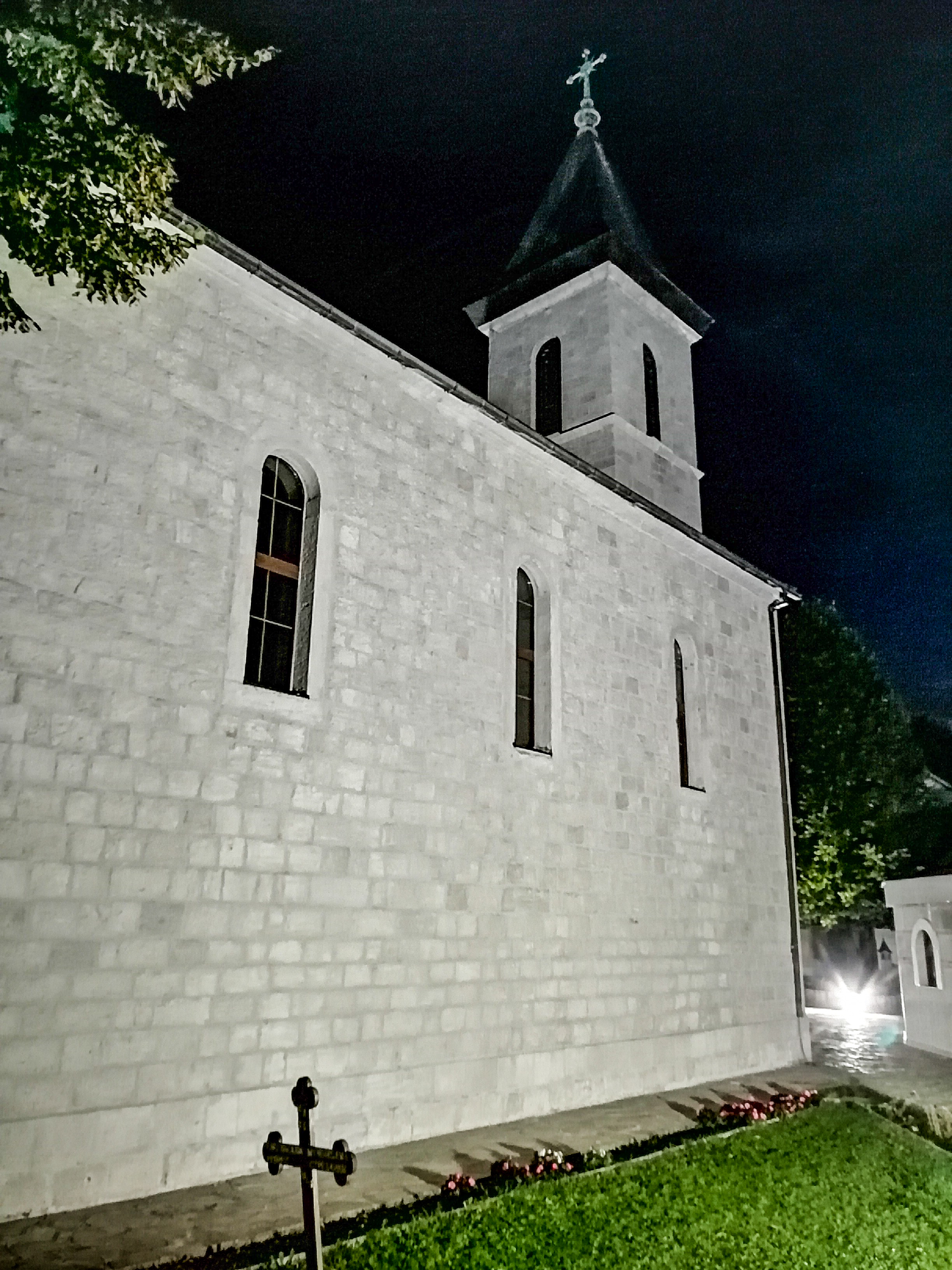
A Serbian Orthodox church, built in the 19th century

=== Population ===
Population of settlements – Nevesinje municipality
	Settlement	1948.	1953.	1961.	1971.	1981.	1991.	2013.
	Total	23,820	20,474		19,333	16,326	14,448	12,961
1	Batkovići						262	346
2	Biograd						507	495
3	Bojišta						546	659
4	Bratač						354	240
5	Krekovi						356	340
6	Miljevac						390	1,001
7	Nevesinje	1,615		2,349	3,055	3,605	4,068	5,162
8	Šehovina						413	598
9	Zalužje						332	222
10	Žiljevo						355	471
11	Zovi Do						422	293

=== Ethnic composition ===
Ethnic composition – Nevesinje town
	2013.	1991.	1981.	1971.
Total	5,162 (100,0%)	4,068 (100,0%)	3,605 (100,0%)	3,055 (100,0%)
Serbs	5,125 (99,28%)	3,247 (79,82%)	2,622 (72,73%)	2,268 (74,24%)
Unaffiliated	14 (0,271%)			
Bosniaks	6 (0,116%)	634 (15,59%)	593 (16,45%)	642 (21,01%)
Croats	6 (0,116%)	39 (0,959%)	59 (1,637%)	91 (2,979%)
Others	6 (0,116%)	44 (1,082%)	4 (0,111%)	10 (0,327%)
Yugoslavs	2 (0,039%)	104 (2,557%)	304 (8,433%)	25 (0,818%)
Unknown	2 (0,039%)			
Slovenes	1 (0,019%)		4 (0,111%)	3 (0,098%)
Montenegrins			13 (0,361%)	12 (0,393%)
Albanians			6 (0,166%)	4 (0,131%)

Ethnic composition – Nevesinje municipality
	2013.	1991.	1981.	1971.
Total	12,961 (100,0%)	14,448 (100,0%)	16,326 (100,0%)	19,333 (100,0%)
Serbs	12,353 (95,31%)	10,711 (74,13%)	11,587 (70,97%)	14,479 (74,89%)
Bosniaks	538 (4,151%)	3,313 (22,93%)	3,853 (23,60%)	4,370 (22,60%)
Croats	28 (0,216%)	210 (1,453%)	276 (1,691%)	384 (1,986%)
Unaffiliated	19 (0,147%)			
Others	10 (0,077%)	91 (0,630%)	26 (0,159%)	37 (0,191%)
Unknown	7 (0,054%)			
Montenegrins	3 (0,023%)		34 (0,208%)	28 (0,145%)
Yugoslavs	2 (0,015%)	123 (0,851%)	539 (3,301%)	28 (0,145%)
Slovenes	1 (0,008%)		4 (0,025%)	3 (0,016%)
Albanians			6 (0,037%)	4 (0,021%)
Macedonians			1 (0,006%)	

== Economy ==
The following table gives a preview of the total number of registered people employed in professional fields per their core activity (as of 2018):

Professional field	Total
Agriculture, forestry and fishing	106
Mining and quarrying	5
Manufacturing	159
Electricity, gas, steam and air conditioning supply	50
Water supply; sewerage, waste management and remediation activities	66
Construction	119
Wholesale and retail trade, repair of motor vehicles and motorcycles	280
Transportation and storage	56
Accommodation and food services	120
Information and communication	20
Financial and insurance activities	19
Real estate activities	2
Professional, scientific and technical activities	27
Administrative and support service activities	8
Public administration and defense; compulsory social security	169
Education	223
Human health and social work activities	155
Arts, entertainment and recreation	52
Other service activities	42
Total	1,678

== Transport ==
Nevesinje's bus station offers daily buses to Podgorica, Nikšić and Danilovgrad in Montenegro via the towns of Gacko, Bileća and Trebinje within Bosnia and Herzegovina. Local buses link the town with the nearby larger metropolitan city of Mostar, a common destination for commuters. The bus station also offers direct routes to major transportation hubs of Dubrovnik in Croatia and Belgrade in Serbia.

== Notable people ==
- Pero Zubac, writer
- Safvet-beg Bašagić, writer
- Borislav Arapović, poet, linguist, literary scholar
- Dražen Bogopenec, county lord (župan) in Zagorje
- Dr. Špiro Soldo, leader of the secret society "Freedom" (Serbian: Слобода) established in 1905/1906
- Ratko Radovanović, basketball player

== Sources ==
- Kapidžić, dr Hamdija: Hercegovački ustanak 1882.godine, Sarajevo, "Veselin Masleša", 1958.
- Trgo, Fabijan, ed. (1964). Zbornik dokumenata i podataka o Narodno-oslobodilačkom ratu Jugoslovenskih naroda. Vol. V, 32.
