= Smail Agha Čengić =

Ottoman general (1780–1840)

- Born: 1780; Jelašce, Foča Nahiye, Bosnia Eyalet, Ottoman Empire, modern-day Kalinovik
- Died: 23 September 1840 (aged 60); Mljetičak, Nikšić Nahiye, Herzegovina Eyalet, Ottoman Empire, modern-day Montenegro
- Cause of death: Murdered in an ambush
- Burial place: Lipnik, Gacko
- Children: Dedaga (Derviš-aga) Čengić (son); Sejdi-beg Čengić (son); Sulejman-beg Čengić (son); Kadri-beg Čengić (son); Hrustem-beg Čengić (son); Muhamed-beg Čengić (son); Uknown son Ćamila hanuma Sulejmanpašić (née Čengić) (daughter)
- Military career
- Allegiance: Ottoman Empire
- Service years: 1809–1840
- Conflicts: First Serbian Uprising (1809–1813); Bosnian uprising (1831–1832); Battle of Grahovo (1836)

Smail Agha Čengić (Bosnian: Smail-aga Čengić, Smajl-aga Čengić or Smajil-aga Čengić; 1780 – 23 September 1840) was an Ottoman aga, muselim (muteselim) and general in the Ottoman Army of Bosniak origin. In 1831–32, Čengić was one of the Ottoman generals who fought against Husein Gradaščević, who was leading a rebellion in Bosnia against the central Ottoman government.

Čengić was known for his battles against the Serb tribes of the Sanjak of Herzegovina. Čengić was killed by Novica Cerović as revenge for killing the younger brother of the Prince-Bishop of Montenegro, Petar II Petrović-Njegoš. His death inspired the 1846 epic poem The Death of Smail-aga Čengić by Ivan Mažuranić.

== Early life ==
Smai-aga was born into the Bosniak noble family of Čengić, who primarily lived in the Nahiye of Foča. The origins of the Čengić family are disputed, by some family accounts they come from a noble Turkoman family which originates from Eğil, in present-day Turkey. Smail-aga was born in the village of Jelašća, then part of the Nahiye of Foča (presentday Kalinovik Municipality, Bosnia and Herzegovina). The Čengić family have been living in Foča and the villages around the town for centuries. Smail's father's name was Ibrahim-aga Čengić, who died when Smail-aga was young. Smail-aga's birth year is believed to be 1778 or 1780.

== 1809–1813 ==
As a junior officer and young general, he fought against Serb insurgents between 1809 and 1813, during the First Serbian Uprising and the uprising in Egypt from 1809 to 1810.

== 1814–? ==
Around 1814, Smail-aga came to Gacko and settled in area of Cernica, then Fazlagić Tower, and finally in Lipnik near Haptovac (now known as Avtovac). Here in Lipnik, he established his residence and official captaincy by building a Tower of Čengić, a small mosque and several residential buildings. He also built several captaincy towers in the wider region of Gacko and Eastern Herzegovina, as well as many villas and houses in Mala Gračanica, Srđevići, Lukovice, Fojnica and Cernica.

== Marriage and family ==
After Smail-aga moved to the nahiye of Gacko, where he became the muteselim, he married Čelebija, the daughter of Bešir-aga Hasanbegović from Haptovac (now Serbianised as Avtovac). Smail-aga was married twice more but the names of his other wives are unknown. Smail-aga has a total of seven sons and one daughter.

== 1835 ==
In 1835, Smail-aga and the pasha of Pljevlja agreed to murder the Drobnjak Serbian Orthodox priest Milutin Cerović; he was killed by the Turks in the centre of the town, and beheaded. Milutin's son Novica, who was the leading Drobnjak chieftain, denounced the Ottomans alongside his fellow tribal chiefs.

== East Herzegovina (1836–1838) ==
In 1836, on Montenegro's northern border with Herzegovina, Serb tribesmen around the town of Grahovo, who were still feudatories of the Muslim lord of Herzegovina, refused to pay the haraç (land-tax for non-Muslims). Recognising the need for outside assistance, the tribesmen declared themselves subjects of Petar II Petrović Njegoš and thus invoked the support of Montenegro. Determined to crush this insubordination, Ali-paša Rizvanbegović, the vizier of Mostar, launched an assault against Grahovo at the beginning of August 1836. When the town fell to the Ottomans, the vizier ordered his forces to seize captives and to burn the town to the ground. As honour demanded, the Montenegrins, under the command of Njegoš's brother Joko and eight close kinsmen, gathered several hundred men to launch a counter-attack in an attempt to rescue the captives. Although initially successful in rescuing the local tribal chieftain and his men, the Montenegrins were quickly overrun by the cavalry of the feared Ottoman commander Smail-aga Čengić. At the same time, they skirmished with the combined forces of Rizvanbegović and Ali-paša Resulbegović of Trebinje. In total, nine members of the Petrović-Njegoš clan perished in the battle, and it is believed that Smail-aga personally killed Njegoš's teenage brother, Joko. During the confrontation, the teenager was hacked to death by the Ottomans along with forty other warriors. Čengić had Joko's severed limbs placed on display.

With the tribesmen of Grahovo being forced to take an oath of loyalty to the Ottomans to be permitted to return to their homes, they were thus prevented from avenging the death of the Montenegrins, including that of Njegoš's brother. The young Prince-Bishop's hopes of quick revenge were hence squandered. News of the defeat at Grahovo soon spread abroad and in 1837 Njegoš was forced to travel to St. Petersburg to defend his behaviour before the Russians. In 1838, Montenegro, under Russian pressure, signed a peace treaty with the Ottomans. The treaty, however, brought about the briefest of pauses as the clashes and beheadings continued soon afterwards.

== Death ==
Four years after the Montenegrin defeat at Grahovo, seeking revenge for the death of his brother, Njegoš plotted the assassination of Smail-aga with the assistance of the local Christians from Herzegovina who lived on the territory under Smail-aga’s control. Njegoš ordered a Montenegrin tribal leader, Novica Cerović, to ambush Smail-aga Čengić, the Ottoman commander who was responsible for killing Njegoš's brother Joko.

In late September 1840, Montenegrins attracted Čengić and his army deep into their territory, organised an ambush and killed them by attacking their camp during the night. The assault occurred in the village of Mljetičak, north of Nikšić. In the ensuing clash, Smail-aga was shot and killed, after which his severed head was brought to Cetinje. As a sign of his gratitude, Njegoš made Cerović a senator. The events are richly attested in Serb epic poetry.

Smail-aga was buried in a turbe in Lipnik, which was burned down by in 1941. The remains of the turbe were used to build a monument to the Yugoslav Partisans.

== Governorship ==
- mütesellim of [the nahiyah of] Gacko, Piva and Drobnjak.

== Legacy ==
=== In folklore ===
Smail-aga Čengić is described by Ivan Mažuranić in his 1846 epic poem The Death of Smail-aga Čengić published in the almanac Iskra, as a major figure. However, his description of Smail-aga is very "biased and hypocritical", according to contemporary Austrian folklorist F. S. Krauss, and this poem does not show Čengić as he really was.

Krauss writes pretty harshly:

Smail-Aga in Mažuranić's poem is described wrongly and unfairly. Our sympathies are with the bold and fearless hero Smail-Aga Čengić, but not with burly highwaymen from Montenegro. Čengić was a true Slav and his murderers pathetic, cowardly scum.

— "Hrvatsko kolo", pp. 105–106.

Vuk Stefanović Karadžić was contemporary of Smail, and he met him several times on his journeys across Bosnia and Herzegovina. Contrary to Ivan Mažuranić, Vuk Karadžić wrote quite positively about Smail-aga Čengić. For Vuk he wasn't just personification of Ottoman authority, instead primarily Smail was Bosnian Slav with tremendous prestige, respectability and influence among Bosnian Slavs, not only of Islamic but also Christian religious affiliation.

As Čengić's acquaintance Vuk Karadžić wrote more positive picture:

Čengić family span time between their first noblemen (Kingdom of Bosnia era) and captains of Turkish law (Ottoman Bosnia era) in Herzegovina and in Bosnia. In our folk songs they were Alai Beys and Pashas. These songs tell us their palace and fortress stands in Zagorije, however Smail-aga seat was in village Lipnik near Gacko, where his sons still dwell today. For Smail-aga it was believed and said that he was first hero among entire Turkish empire best and boldest.

— Vuk Karadžić (1845).

=== In Bosniak poetry ===
Smaiil-aga's great-grandson Safvet-beg Bašagić wrote a song titled The Death of Smail-aga Čengić, in a book called Early fruits of the Herzegovinian forest (Bosnian: Trofanda iz hercegovačke dubrave). The entry to the song follows:

The scorching sun sheds its golden rays
from the peak of Mount Durmitor,
Which, towering above all other mountains,
gazes at its reflection in the waves of the sea.

When the Aga the muselim of Gacko
Descended with his troop upon the plains of Drobnjak,
He embodied the pride of the noble begs (beys) Of
the illustrious Čengić family.

How magnificent the surroundings are oh God!
Around the tower of Prince Malović
and the flag-bearers of the mighty Čengić have adorned it even more splendidly.

For the fierce heroes of Gacko
Flash in pure gold, While their spirited steeds and chargers
Are all decked out in solid silver.

The blazing Sun sank into the sea,
and black night wrestled with the day,
when the young priest’s wife came running
and spoke thus to the Aga:

"Smajil-Aga, dear sworn brother!
The night is dark and Drobnjak a perilous place;
do not stay here to lodge,
if you wish to avoid a senseless death!"

"Did you hear, what the Vlach woman said?"
the Aga began haughtily
"That I dare not spend the night here?
Good God, and for fear of what devil?

Does a hero tremble before a hare?
Does a Turk fear the Cross?
Tell me, on your soul
how many Vlachs dare you face?"
...

-Trofanda iz hercegovačke dubrave, p 158-159

== Bibliography ==
- Hadžijahić, Muhamed (1966). "Turska komponenta u etnogenezi Bosanskih muslimana". Pregled: časopis zu društvena pitanja. 18 (11–12): 485–502.
