= Lipnik, Gacko =

Lipnik Липник
- Village
- Location within Bosnia and Herzegovina
- Coordinates: 43°8′N 18°37′E
- Country: Bosnia and Herzegovina
- Entity: Republika Srpska
- Municipality: Gacko
- Time zone: UTC+1 (CET)
  - Summer (DST): UTC+2 (CEST)

Lipnik (Serbian Cyrillic: Липник) is a village in the municipality of Gacko, Republika Srpska, Bosnia and Herzegovina.

Since around 1814, Smail-aga Čengić settled in Lipnik near Avtovac, where he established his residence and official captaincy by building a Tower of Čengić, a small mosque and several residential buildings. He also built several captaincy towers in the wider region of Gacko and Eastern Herzegovina, as well as many villas and houses in Mala Gračanica, Srđevići, Lukovice, Fojnica and Cernica.
