= Gacko massacre =

Mass killing during WWII

- Part of World War II in Yugoslavia
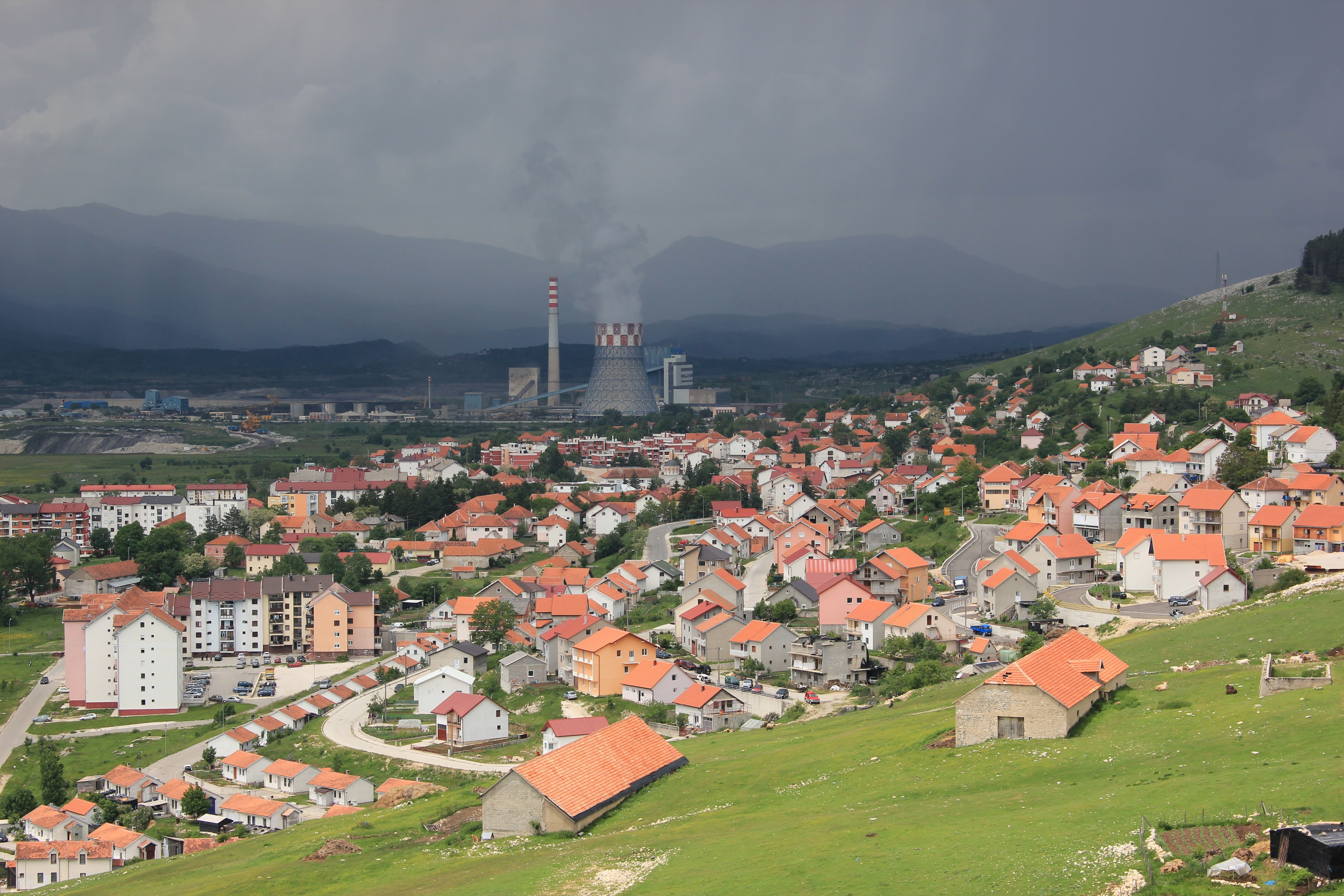
- Gacko in 2018
- Location: 43°10′N 18°32′E; Gacko, Independent State of Croatia
- Date: 4 June 1941
- Target: Serbs
- Attack type: Summary executions
- Deaths: 170–180
- Perpetrator: Ustaše

The Gacko massacre was the mass killing of 170-180 Serb civilians by the Croatian fascist Ustaše movement on 4 June 1941, during World War II.

== Background ==
On 6 April 1941, Yugoslavia was invaded by the Axis powers. The ensuing capitulation resulted in its territory being divided between Germany and its allies. Adolf Hitler set up the Independent State of Croatia (NDH), a puppet-state which covered present-day Croatia (excluding Dalmatia), all of present-day Bosnia and Herzegovina and parts of present-day Serbia. The Croatian fascist ultranationalist Ustaše movement were appointed to rule the new state with Ante Pavelić installed as the leader. The Ustaše then embarked on a campaign of genocide against the Serb, Jewish and Roma population within their borders. Muslims were not persecuted due to the belief that they were descendants of Croats who had converted to Islam. A great deal of the Muslim population sided with the Ustaše while others joined the Communist Partisans.

According to the 1931 census, the municipality of Gacko had a population of 15,233 of whom 5,724 were Muslims. Taking into account the nearby municipality of Nevesinje, the two regions' Serb population constituted 67%, Muslim 28% and Croat nearly 4%.

With the signing of the Treaties of Rome between Fascist Italy and the NDH, Ustaša units began their administrative takeover following Italy's withdrawal from zone III. Local upper-class Muslims were put in charge of Gacko. A group of Ustašas led by Herman "Krešo" Tongl arrived and began organizing a local command in Gacko. They attempted to win over the support of the Muslims by promising them among other things, the return of landholdings they lost during the agrarian reforms of the 1920s and the building of mosques in villages.

Historian Tomislav Dulić notes that Ustaše success in carrying out massacres often depended on them securing the support and trust of local Croats and Muslims, and that "Where such pacification succeeded, they were more or less free to initiate the destruction process." Tongl held a meeting with local Muslims where he presented a historical exposition and outlined the Ustaše's ideological views on the Muslim population. He finished the meeting by arguing that all Serbs had to be killed: "We cannot be satisfied and will not stop until the total extermination of the last Serb from our Independent State of Croatia. The last bullet for the last Serb."

== Massacre ==
On 2 June, Tongl issued an order to the Serb inhabitants of the villages of Korita and Zagradci demanding that all males above the age of fifteen report to a building in the village of Stepen. This was under the ruse that they would be issued passports so they could cross the border into Montenegro and that those who failed to show up would be deported or executed. The majority went in voluntarily. Over 100 people were incarcerated in the Sokol Society building and another 12 in the nearby school where they were held for two days.

On 4 June, Tongl came to Korita with a group of Ustašas and informed the prisoners that they would be sent to Germany for forced labour. Next, the prisoners who numbered about 170 were tied together in groups of two or three, loaded onto a lorry and driven to the Golubnjača limestone pit near Kobilja Glava for execution. A survivor testified to his ordeal:

When we arrived by car to the pit, the Ustašas – there were 100-200 of them there and I could not recognise them since it was dark – began to unload us from the car, after which every group of two, three people was brought to the pit, where they started shooting at us with their weapons, beating us with poles, cudgels, axes and picks. When they saw that those brought to the pit were dead, they pushed them inside with the poles. When I, Nosović Obren, was brought to the pit, tied to Krsto Svorcan, someone fired a rifle shot from a distance of two to three steps. Krsto Svorcan immediately fell down dead and pulled me unharmed with him. Since I did not utter a sound, the Ustašas, probably thinking we were both dead, pushed Krsto Svorcan and me into the pit with a pole. ... During the fall with Krsto Svorcan, I landed on top of him and the already dead people, thanks to which I only broke a rib on my left side.

On 7 June, one of the survivors was rescued from the pit by Serb peasants who lived in the vicinity but died two hours later from his injuries. Between 170 and 180 people perished in the massacre.

== Aftermath ==
The massacres in the municipality of Gacko affected other areas in Eastern Herzegovina and provoked a rebellion led by Orthodox priest Radojica Perišić centred around Gacko. This was the first major uprising against the NDH before the Partisan full-scale rebellion in July 1941.

== Sources ==
- Byford, Jovan (2020). Picturing Genocide in the Independent State of Croatia: Atrocity Images and the Contested Memory of the Second World War in the Balkans. Bloomsbury Publishing. ISBN 978-1-35001-598-2.
- Dulic, Tomislav (2005). Utopias of Nation: Local Mass Killing in Bosnia and Herzegovina, 1941-42. Coronet Books Incorporated. ISBN 978-9-15546-302-1.
- Dulic, Tomislav (22 November 2011). "Gacko massacre, June 1941". sciencespo.fr. The Paris Institute of Political Studies.
- Hoare, Marko Attila (2006). Genocide and Resistance in Hitler's Bosnia: The Partisans and the Chetniks, 1941-1943. Oxford University Press. ISBN 978-0-19726-380-8.
- Levy, Michele Frucht (2013). Crowe, David M. (ed.). Crimes of State Past and Present: Government-Sponsored Atrocities and International Legal Responses. Routledge. ISBN 978-1-31798-682-9.
- Milazzo, Matteo J. (2019). The Chetnik Movement and the Yugoslav Resistance. Johns Hopkins University Press. ISBN 978-1-42143-340-0.
- Redzic, Enver; Donia, Robert (2004). Bosnia and Herzegovina in the Second World War. Routledge. ISBN 978-1-13576-735-8.
- Rodogno, Davide (2006). Fascism's European Empire: Italian Occupation During the Second World War. Cambridge University Press. ISBN 978-0-52184-515-1.
- Tomasevich, Jozo (2001). War and Revolution in Yugoslavia, 1941–1945: Occupation and Collaboration. Stanford, California: Stanford University Press. ISBN 978-0-8047-3615-2.
