= Radojica Perišić =

Serbian priest and military officer

- Радојица Перишић
- Born: 1906; Kazanci, Condominium of Bosnia and Herzegovina, Austria-Hungary
- Died: April 1945 (aged 38–39); Lijevče Polje, Independent State of Croatia, modern-day Bosnia and Herzegovina
- Military career
- Allegiance: Kingdom of Yugoslavia
- Branch: Chetniks
- Rank: voivode
- Conflicts: June 1941 uprising in eastern Herzegovina; Battle of Lijevče polje
- Awards: Order of the Star of Karađorđe

Radojica Perišić (1906 — April 1945) was a Serbian priest and Chetnik leader and one of the main leaders of the June 1941 uprising in eastern Herzegovina during World War II. Perišić was born in Kazanci 1906. During World War II he was commander of the Chetnik Gacko Brigade. Perišić was killed by Ustaše in April 1945. The post-war communist historiography intentionally ignored the June 1941 uprising in eastern Herzegovina because it would contradict the communist narrative about rebels being led by communists. In the period after the Fall of the Berlin Wall Gacko municipality proclaimed 6 June as their holiday in honor of the beginning of the uprising and held public ceremonies on 6 June as the Day of Gacko.

== World War II ==
=== June 1941 uprising in eastern Herzegovina ===
At the beginning of the World War II Perišić was a priest of the Serbian Orthodox Church in Kazanci, Gacko, Eastern Herzegovina. When population of Eastern Herzegovina was subjected to genocide carried by Independent State of Croatia, Perišić inspired the local population to start a rebellion and defend themselves.

Perišić commanded rebel units from villages Kazanci, Golija, Vratkovići and Dobrelji. On 6 June Perišić led the insurgents from his village during the attack on local gendarmes.

Since Perišić and Milorad Popović had a significant influence on population in part of Gacko county, while captain Bajagić on part of villages near border toward Montenegro, the rebels entrusted them to lead attack on Ustaše position in Avtovac and Fazlagića Kula on 28 June 1941.

During the preparation for the attack on Avtovac, Gacko and Fazlagića Kula, Perišić sent a letter to Dramešina. Avtovac, defended by 200 Croatian Home Guard, 50 Ustaše from Eastern Herzegovina and 20 Ustaše from Western Herzegovina, was attacked in dawn of 28 June 1941.

Perišič was a leader of nationalist rebels, together with Manja Višnjić. The nationalist rebels established a battalion in November 1941, when communist also established their battalion.

According to post-war sources published in communist governed Yugoslavia, Perišić met with Radoje Dakić and other members of headquarters of the communist detachment and agreed to cooperate in the struggle against Italian occupiers and Ustaše in Gatac county.

Perišić was one of main organizers of gathering of the people of Gacko and Piva held on Ravno on 18 July 1941. According to Chetnik sources Perišić was awarded with Order of the Star of Karađorđe and promoted to the rank of voivode.

=== Rest of the war ===
In January 1942, the Partisans captured Boško Todorović, the commander and delegate of the Chetnik leader Draža Mihailović in eastern Bosnia, in the village of Vrba, near Gacko. He was captured together with nine other Chetniks, including Captain Radojica Rončević and Vidak Kovačević. The Partisans and their captives headed toward Partisan Montenegrin HQ in Nikšić, but they were intercepted by Chetniks commanded by the priest Perišić who released Bošković and arrested the Partisans. Against the order of Bošković, the Partisans were released.

Perišić was commander of the Gacko Brigade when he was killed together with 24 of his men in a battle with Ustaše in April 1945 during the Battle of Lijevče polje.

== Legacy ==
The post-war historiography intentionally ignored pre-22 June rebels in Eastern Herzegovina and Sanski Most because they occurred in the period of collaboration between communists and fascists, so it would contradict the communist narrative about rebels being led by communists. On the other hand, the first Partisan battalion established in Gacko at the end of 1941 was named "6th June" in honor of the first date of the uprising. In period after the Fall of the Berlin Wall Gacko municipality proclaimed 6 June as their holiday in honor of the beginning of the uprising and held public ceremonies on 6 June as the Day of Gacko.

== Sources ==
- Cicmil, Obrad (1966). Durmitorski NOP odred i njegovo područje 1941-1945. Vojnoizdavački.
- Dimitrijević, Bojan; Nikolić, Kosta (2004). Đeneral Mihailović: biografija [General Mihailović: Biography] (in Serbian). Belgrade, Serbia: Institute for Contemporary History. ISBN 978-86-7403-095-0.
- Dulić, Tomislav (2005). Utopias of Nation: Local Mass Killing in Bosnia and Herzegovina, 1941-42. Uppsala University. ISBN 978-91-554-6302-1.
- Jovanović, Blažo (1983). Izabrani radovi: Narodnooslobodilački rat i revoliucija [Selected papers: National Liberation War and Revolution] (in Serbian). NIO "Pobjeda".
- Karchmar, Lucien (1973). Draz̆a Mihailović and the Rise of the C̆etnik Movement, 1941-1942. Department of History, Stanford University.
- Kilibarda, Gojko M. (1969). Nikšić u svjetlosti pedesetgodišnjice SKJ 1919-1969. g: (Monografski hronološki pregled nastanka i razvitka radničkog pokreta s posebnim osvrtom na period oslobodilačkog rata i socijalističke revolucije 1941-1945. godine) Kratak pregled sa uvodom i prilozima. Odbor za proslavu pedesetgodišnjice SKJ, SKOJ-a i SSJ opštine.
- Krstić, Uglješa; Krstić, Anika; Nikolić, Kosta (2004). Na Sremskom frontu zatišje: hronika života i smrti [All Quiet on the Srem Front: A Chronicle of Life and Death] (in Serbian). Belgrade, Serbia: Bajat. ISBN 978-86-7039-082-9.
- Redžić, Vučeta (2002). Građanski rat u Crnoj Gori: Dešavanja od sredine 1942. godine do sredine 1945. godine. Stupovi.
- Tomić, Nikola N. (1978). Crna Gora pod okupacijom [Montenegro under occupation].
- Zeković, Veljko; Đurović, Milinko; Stanišić, Milija (1982). Nikšićki srez u NOR-u: zbornik radova. Centar za marksističko obrazovanje "Nikola Kovačević".
