= Bogdan Zimonjić =

Serbian priest and revolutionary (1813–1909)

Bogdan Zimonjić Богдан Зимоњић
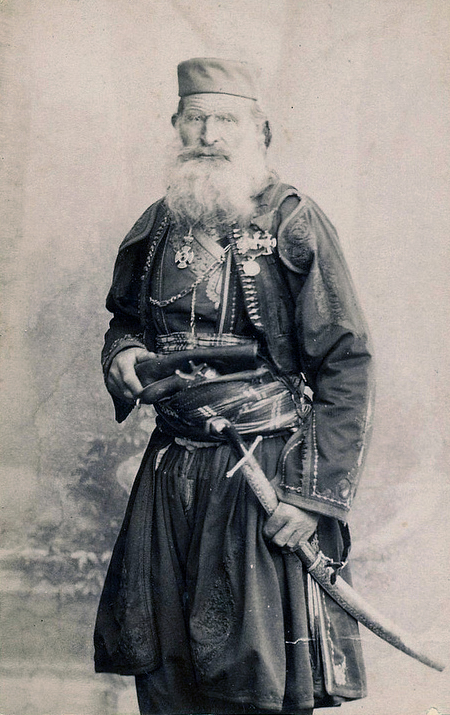
- Born: 1813; Gareva, Gacko, Bosnia Vilayet, Ottoman Empire
- Died: 21 January 1909 (aged 95) Pusto polje, Gacko, Condominium of Bosnia and Herzegovina, Austro-Hungarian Empire
- Branch: Serb revolutionaries in Herzegovina
- Rank: Vojvoda

Bogdan Zimonjić, (Serbian Cyrillic: Богдан Зимоњић; 1813 – 21 January 1909) was a Serbian Orthodox priest and Vojvoda (military commander) in two major uprisings against the Ottoman Empire in 19th-century Herzegovina: in 1852–62, and 1875–78. He is mentioned in archival sources along with other Serbian freedom-fighting priests, including Jovica Ilić and his associates Pavle Tvrtković, Mile Vitković, and Stevan Avramović, who rebelled against the occupiers, and another priest, Petko Jagodić of Šamac, who led the next revolt, while history records further armed clashes led by priests Mile Čulibrk, Marko Popović, Vaso Kovačević, and Gaćina.

His son Petar Zimonjić, the metropolitan of Dabar-Bosnia, was killed by the Ustaše regime in the Independent State of Croatia in June 1941.
