= Fojnica (disambiguation) =

Fojnica can refer to:

- Fojnica, a town in Bosnia
- Fojnica, Gacko, a village in Bosnia
- Fojnička River, a river in Bosnia
