= Zagradci =

Zagradci may refer to:

- Zagradci, Bosnia and Herzegovina, a village near Gacko
- Zagradci, Croatia, a village near Netretić
