= Mjedenik =

Mjedenik Мједеник
- Village
- Location within Bosnia and Herzegovina
- Coordinates: 43°19′N 18°26′E
- Country: Bosnia and Herzegovina
- Entity: Republika Srpska
- Municipality: Gacko
- Time zone: UTC+1 (CET)
  - Summer (DST): UTC+2 (CEST)

Mjedenik (Serbian Cyrillic: Мједеник) is a village in the municipality of Gacko, Republika Srpska, Bosnia and Herzegovina.
