= Church of St. Nicholas, Srđevići =

Church of St. Nicholas
- Црква светог Николе; Crkva svetog Nikole
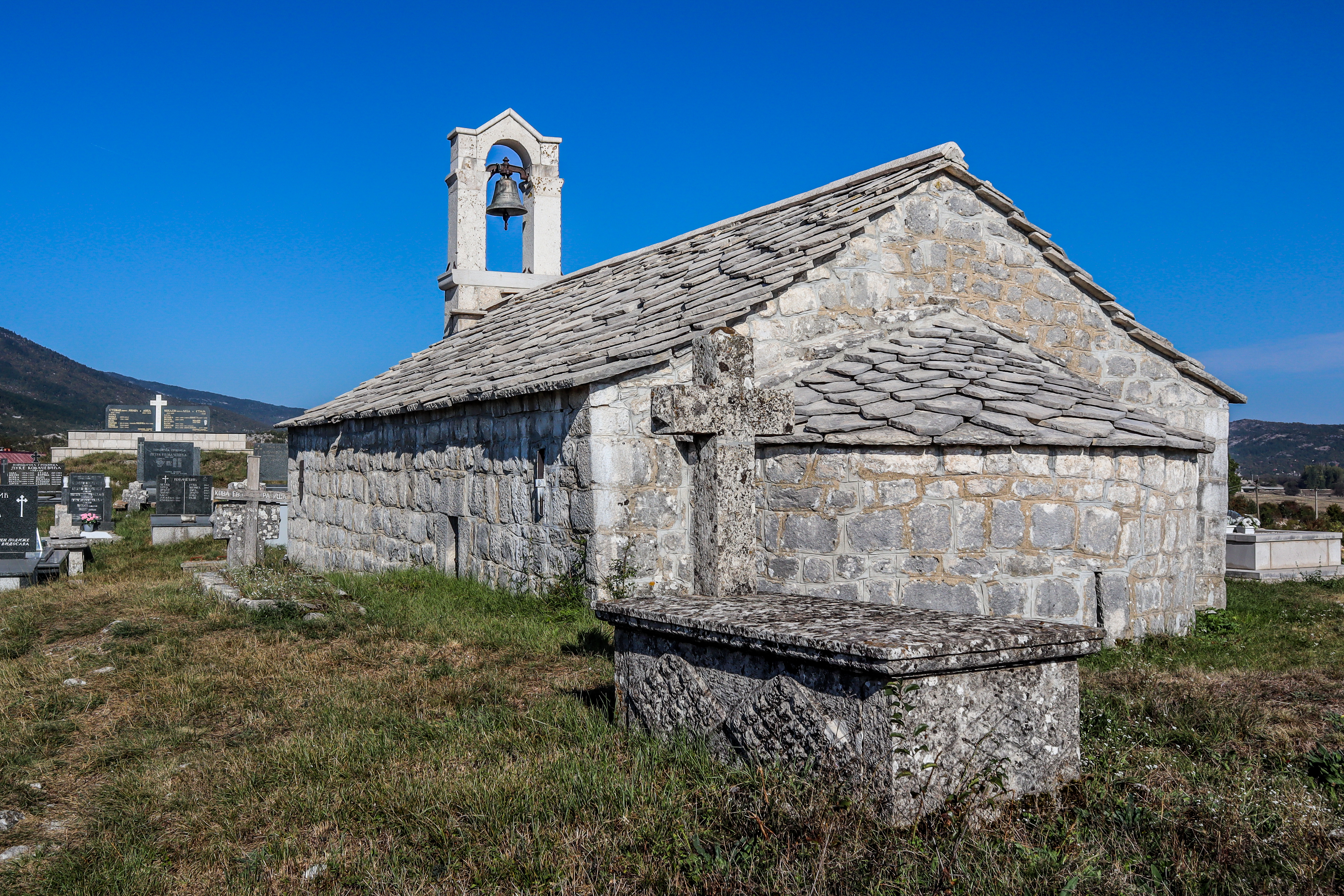
- Church of St Nicholas
- Church of St. Nicholas
- 43°09′58″N 18°28′55″E
- Location: Srđevići, Republika Srpska
- Country: Bosnia and Herzegovina
- Denomination: Serbian Orthodox

History
- Status: Church
- Dedication: St. Nicholas

Architecture
- Functional status: Active

Administration
- Archdiocese: Eparchy of Zahumlje and Herzegovina

The Church of St. Nicholas (Serbian: Црква светог Николе) in Srđevići is Serbian Orthodox church in Republika Srpska, Bosnia and Herzegovina. The exact construction date of the building is unknown but it is known that the church dates back to before 1598. It belongs to the Eparchy of Zahumlje and Herzegovina. The first written records about Srđevići, dating back to the beginning of the 15th century, can be found in Dubrovnik's archival sources and in the Sopoćani Chronicle. In 2005 the church was declared a national monument of Bosnia and Herzegovina delegating the formal legal obligation for protection, conservation, and presentation to the Government of Republika Srpska.

== See also ==
- Eparchy of Zahumlje and Herzegovina
