= Dubljevići =

Dubljevići Дубљевићи
- Village
- Location within Bosnia and Herzegovina
- Coordinates: 43°16′N 18°24′E
- Country: Bosnia and Herzegovina
- Entity: Republika Srpska
- Municipality: Gacko
- Time zone: UTC+1 (CET)
  - Summer (DST): UTC+2 (CEST)

Dubljevići (Serbian Cyrillic: Дубљевићи) is a village in the municipality of Gacko, Republika Srpska, Bosnia and Herzegovina.
