= Bašići, Gacko =

Bašići Башићи
- Village
- Location within Bosnia and Herzegovina
- Coordinates: 43°08′38″N 18°29′19″E
- Country: Bosnia and Herzegovina
- Entity: Republika Srpska
- Municipality: Gacko
- Time zone: UTC+1 (CET)
  - Summer (DST): UTC+2 (CEST)

Bašići (Serbian Cyrillic: Башићи) is a village in the municipality of Gacko, Bosnia and Herzegovina. It is located in the Republika Srpska entity within the country Bosnia and Herzegovina.
