= Stari Dulići =

Stari Dulići Стари Дулићи
- Village
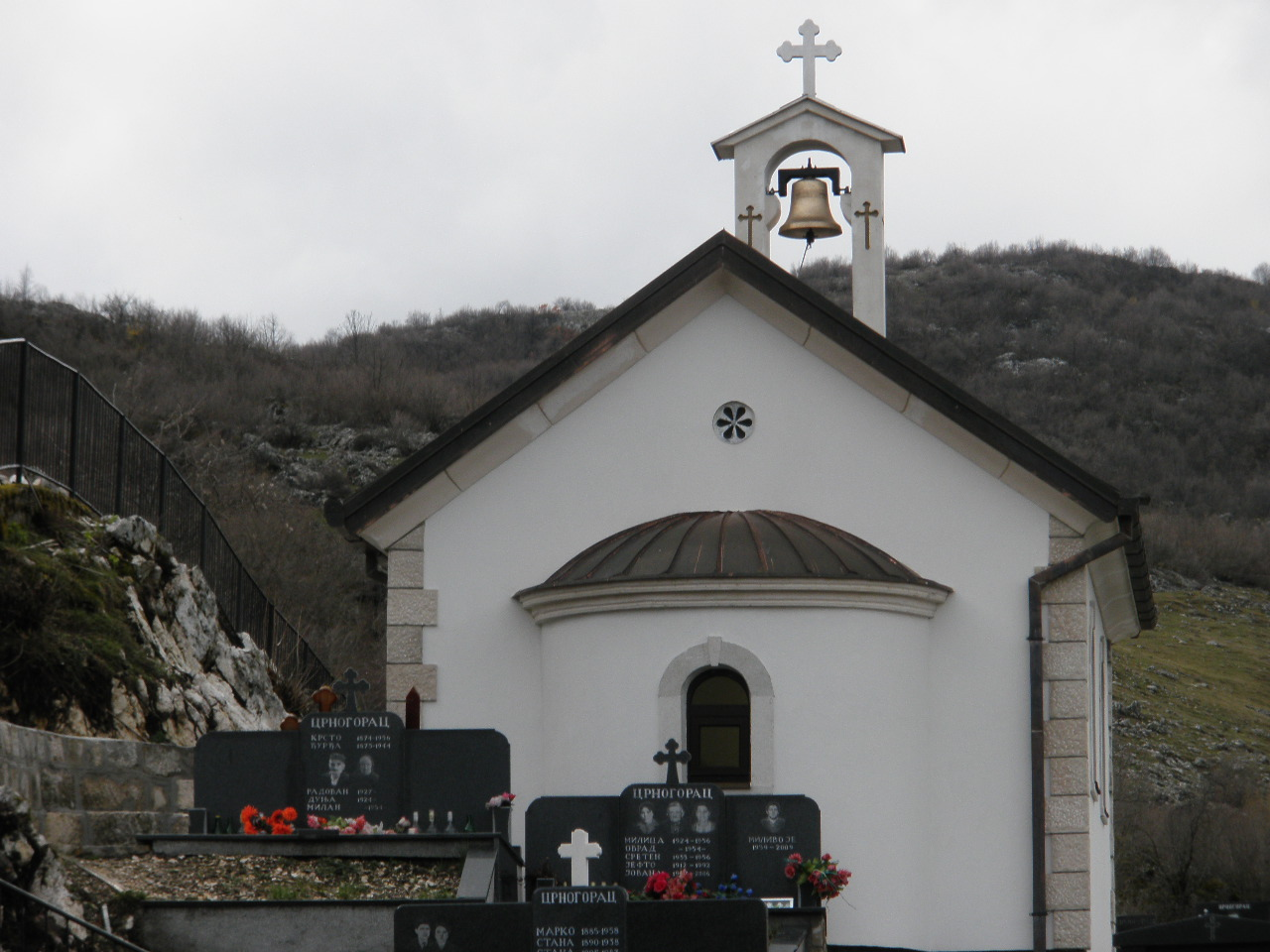

- Location within Bosnia and Herzegovina
- Coordinates: 43°03′N 18°36′E
- Country: Bosnia and Herzegovina
- Entity: Republika Srpska
- Municipality: Gacko
- Time zone: UTC+1 (CET)
  - Summer (DST): UTC+2 (CEST)

Stari Dulići (Serbian Cyrillic: Стари Дулићи) is a village in the municipality of Gacko, Republika Srpska, Bosnia and Herzegovina.
