= Kula, Gacko =

Coordinates: 43°07′56″N 18°30′56″E

Kula Кула
- Village
- Location within Bosnia and Herzegovina
- Country: Bosnia and Herzegovina
- Entity: Republika Srpska
- Municipality: Gacko
- Time zone: UTC+1 (CET)
  - Summer (DST): UTC+2 (CEST)

Kula (Serbian Cyrillic: Кула) is a village in the municipality of Gacko, Republika Srpska, Bosnia and Herzegovina.
