= Miholjače =

Miholjače Михољаче
- Village
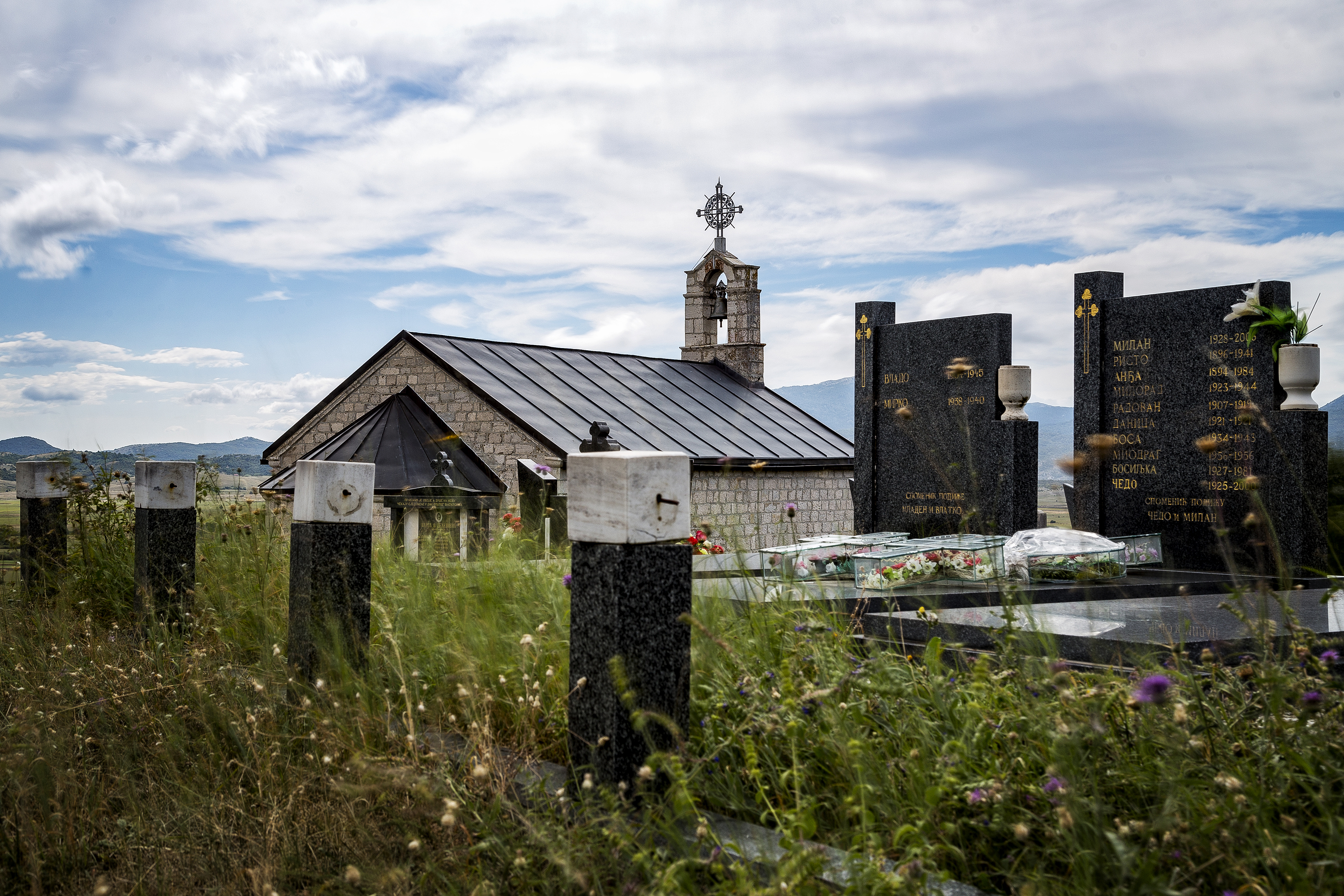
- Church in Miholjače

- Location within Bosnia and Herzegovina
- Coordinates: 43°09′N 18°35′E
- Country: Bosnia and Herzegovina
- Entity: Republika Srpska
- Municipality: Gacko
- Time zone: UTC+1 (CET)
  - Summer (DST): UTC+2 (CEST)

Miholjače (Serbian Cyrillic: Михољаче) is a village in the municipality of Gacko, Republika Srpska, Bosnia and Herzegovina.
