= Jabuka, Gacko =

Jabuka Јабука
- Village
- Location within Bosnia and Herzegovina
- Coordinates: 43°18′23″N 18°34′55″E
- Country: Bosnia and Herzegovina
- Entity: Republika Srpska
- Municipality: Gacko
- Time zone: UTC+1 (CET)
  - Summer (DST): UTC+2 (CEST)

Jabuka (Serbian Cyrillic: Јабука) is a village in the municipality of Gacko, Republika Srpska, Bosnia and Herzegovina.
