= Ravni, Gacko =

Ravni Равни
- Village
- Location within Bosnia and Herzegovina
- Coordinates: 43°14′15″N 18°26′22″E
- Country: Bosnia and Herzegovina
- Entity: Republika Srpska
- Municipality: Gacko
- Time zone: UTC+1 (CET)
  - Summer (DST): UTC+2 (CEST)

Ravni (Serbian Cyrillic: Равни) is a village in the municipality of Gacko, Republika Srpska, Bosnia and Herzegovina.
