= Kokorina, Gacko =

Kokorina Кокорина
- Village
- Location within Bosnia and Herzegovina
- Coordinates: 43°17′N 18°25′E
- Country: Bosnia and Herzegovina
- Entity: Republika Srpska
- Municipality: Gacko
- Time zone: UTC+1 (CET)
  - Summer (DST): UTC+2 (CEST)

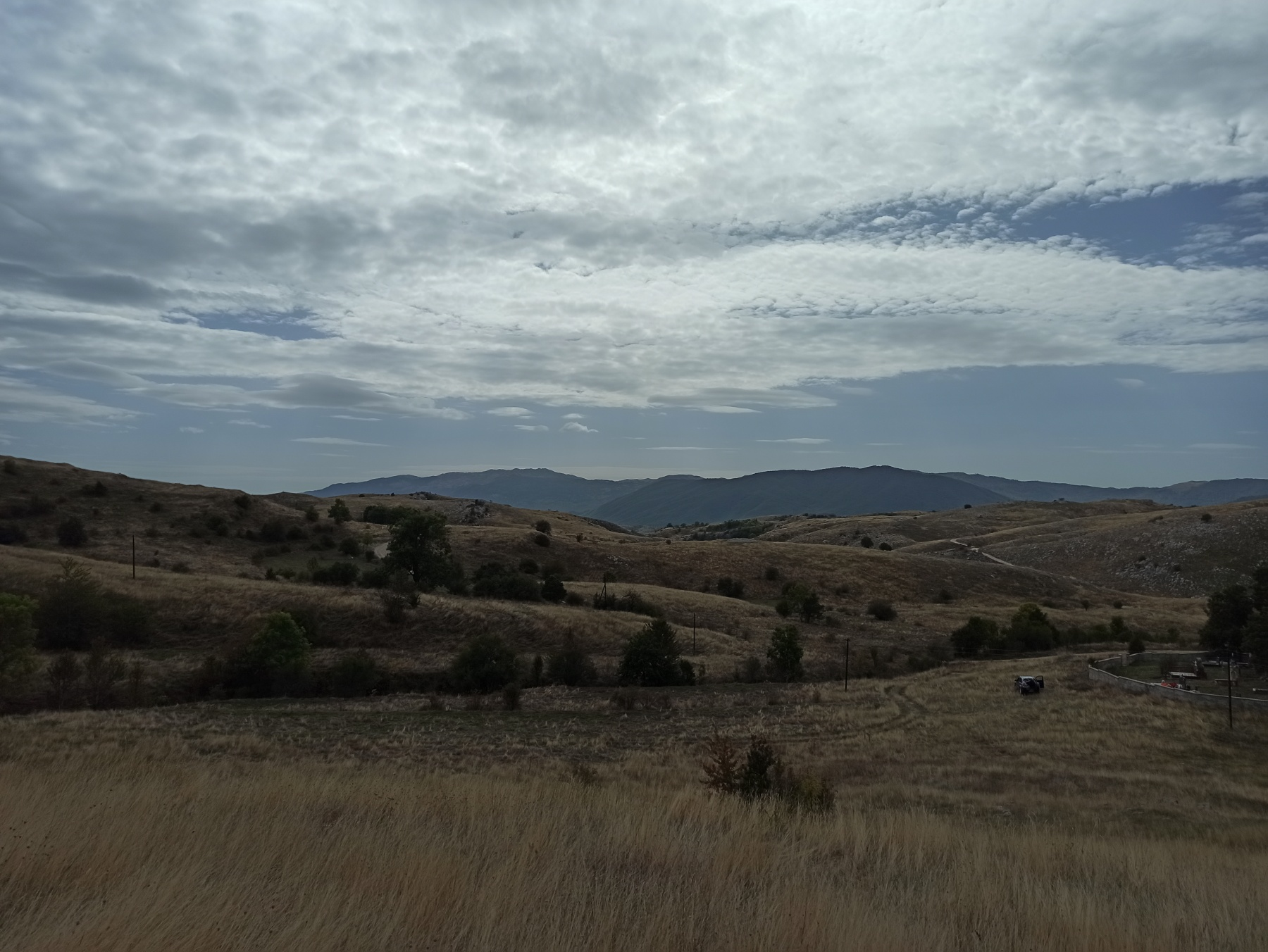
Kokorina village, Herzegovina, Gacko municipality

Kokorina (Serbian Cyrillic: Кокорина) is a village in the municipality of Gacko, Republika Srpska, Bosnia and Herzegovina.
