= Luka, Gacko =

Coordinates: 43°16′35.76″N 18°34′32.88″E

Luka Лука
- Village
- Location within Bosnia and Herzegovina
- Country: Bosnia and Herzegovina
- Entity: Republika Srpska
- Municipality: Gacko
- Time zone: UTC+1 (CET)
  - Summer (DST): UTC+2 (CEST)

Luka (Serbian Cyrillic: Лука) is a village in the municipality of Gacko, Republika Srpska, Bosnia and Herzegovina.
