= Ljeskov Dub =

Ljeskov Dub Љесков Дуб
- Village
- Location within Bosnia and Herzegovina
- Coordinates: 43°13′32″N 18°21′46″E
- Country: Bosnia and Herzegovina
- Entity: Republika Srpska
- Municipality: Gacko
- Time zone: UTC+1 (CET)
  - Summer (DST): UTC+2 (CEST)

Ljeskov Dub (Serbian Cyrillic: Љесков Дуб) is a village in the municipality of Gacko, Republika Srpska, Bosnia and Herzegovina.
