= Izgori =

Izgori Изгори
- Village
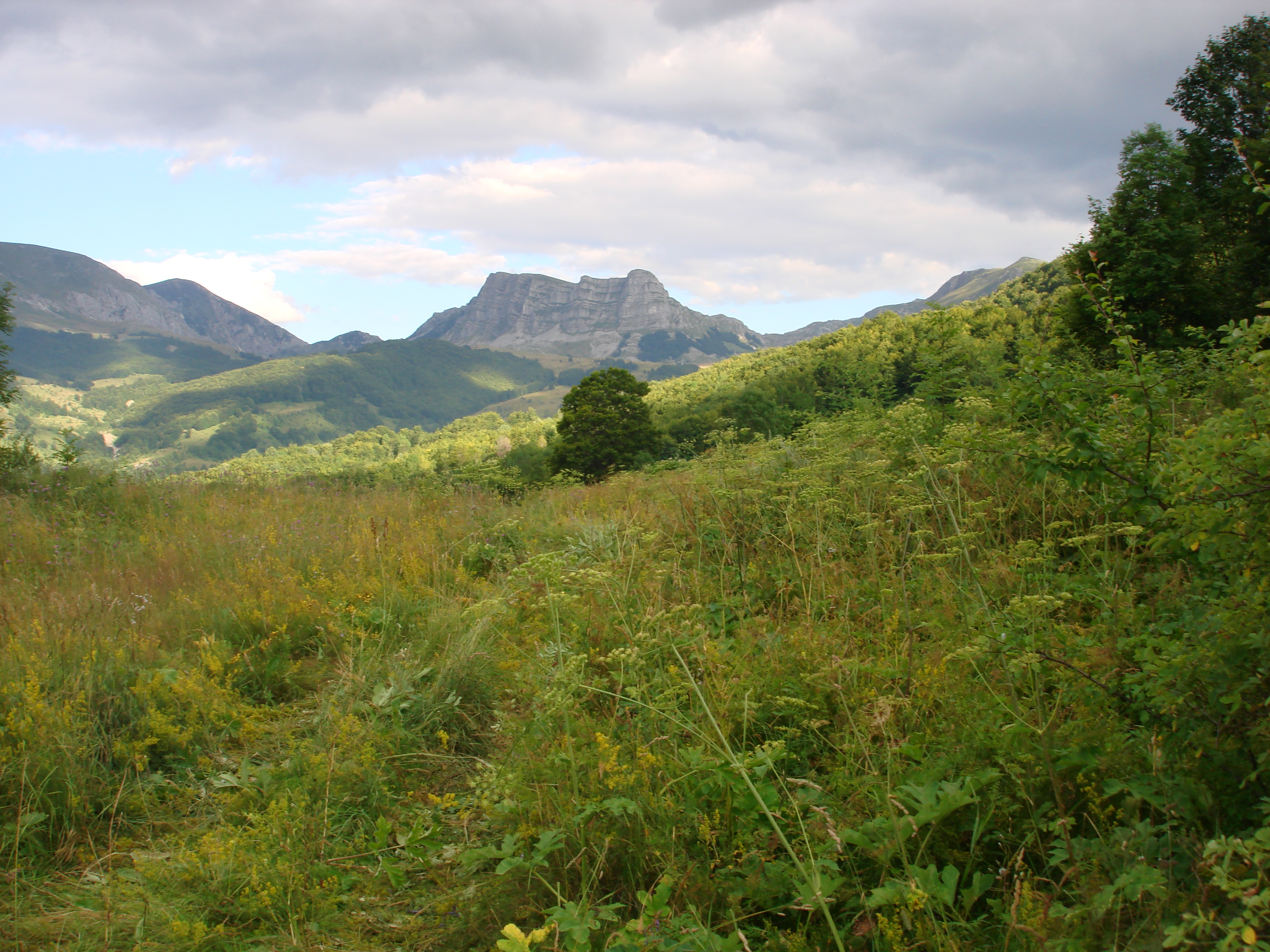

- Location within Bosnia and Herzegovina
- Coordinates: 43°16′29″N 18°37′20″E
- Country: Bosnia and Herzegovina
- Entity: Republika Srpska
- Municipality: Gacko
- Elevation: 1,283 m (4,209 ft)
- Time zone: UTC+1 (CET)
  - Summer (DST): UTC+2 (CEST)
- Area code: (=387) 029

Izgori (Serbian Cyrillic: Изгори) is a village in the municipality of Gacko, Republika Srpska, Bosnia and Herzegovina.
