= Šumići =

Šumići Шумићи
- Village
- Location within Bosnia and Herzegovina
- Coordinates: 43°18′05″N 18°32′35″E
- Country: Bosnia and Herzegovina
- Entity: Republika Srpska
- Municipality: Gacko
- Time zone: UTC+1 (CET)
  - Summer (DST): UTC+2 (CEST)

Šumići (Serbian Cyrillic: Шумићи) is a village in the municipality of Gacko, Republika Srpska, Bosnia and Herzegovina.
