= Višnjevo, Gacko =

Višnjevo Вишњево
- Village
- Location within Bosnia and Herzegovina
- Coordinates: 43°13′N 18°30′E
- Country: Bosnia and Herzegovina
- Entity: Republika Srpska
- Municipality: Gacko
- Time zone: UTC+1 (CET)
  - Summer (DST): UTC+2 (CEST)

Višnjevo (Serbian Cyrillic: Вишњево) is a village in the municipality of Gacko, Republika Srpska, Bosnia and Herzegovina.

== Population ==
=== Ethnic structure, Census 1991. ===
total: 24

- Serbs - 24 (100%)
