= Stolac, Gacko =

Stolac Столац
- Village
- Location within Bosnia and Herzegovina
- Coordinates: 43°06′14″N 18°31′21″E
- Country: Bosnia and Herzegovina
- Entity: Republika Srpska
- Municipality: Gacko
- Time zone: UTC+1 (CET)
  - Summer (DST): UTC+2 (CEST)

Stolac (Serbian Cyrillic: Столац) is a village in the municipality of Gacko, Republika Srpska, Bosnia and Herzegovina.
