= Žanjevica =

Žanjevica Жањевица
- Village
- Location within Bosnia and Herzegovina
- Coordinates: 43°11′N 18°39′E
- Country: Bosnia and Herzegovina
- Entity: Republika Srpska
- Municipality: Gacko
- Time zone: UTC+1 (CET)
  - Summer (DST): UTC+2 (CEST)

Žanjevica (Serbian Cyrillic: Жањевица) is a village in the municipality of Gacko, Republika Srpska, Bosnia and Herzegovina.
