= Domrke =

Domrke Домрке
- Village
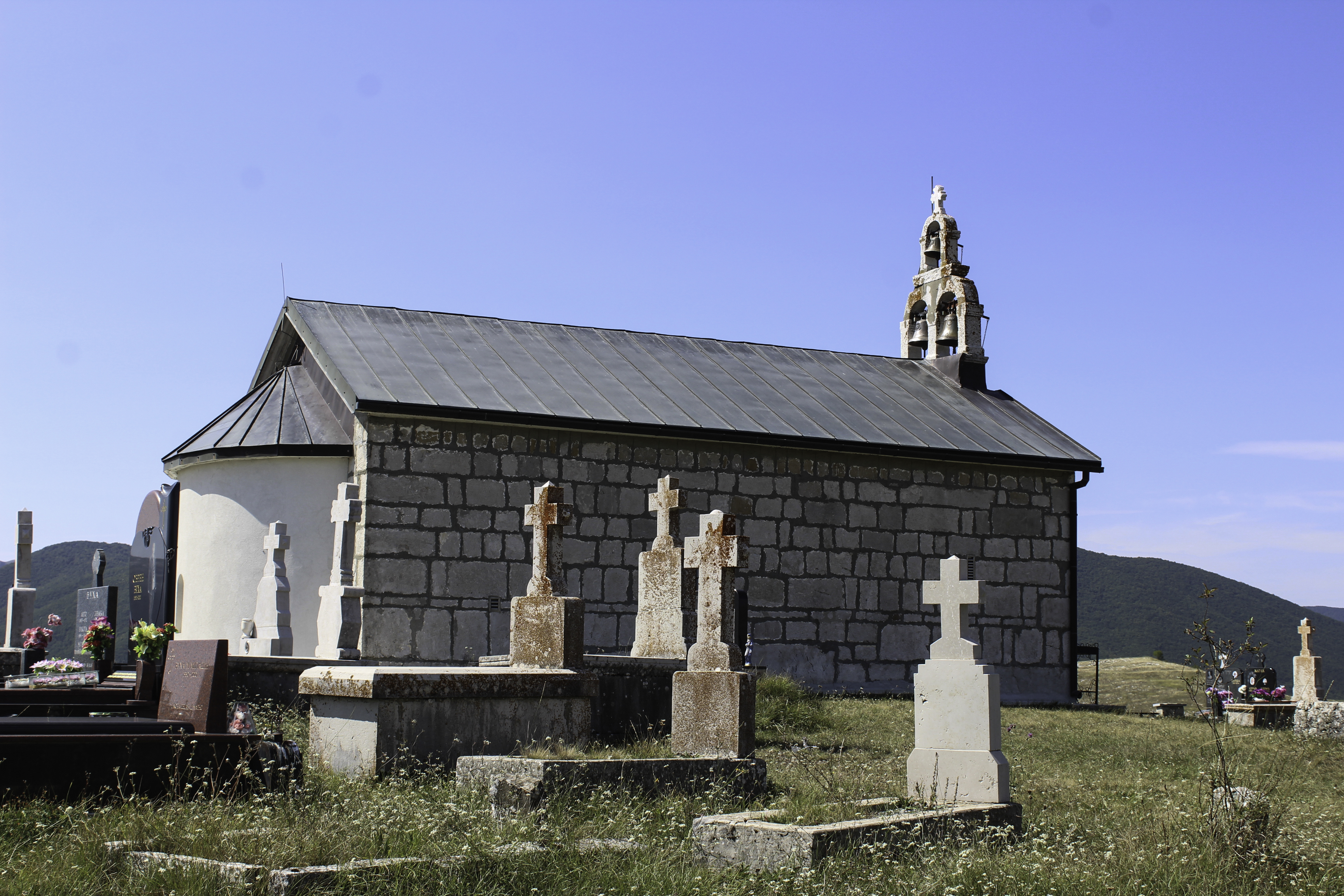
- Serbian Orthodox church in Domrke

- Location within Bosnia and Herzegovina
- Coordinates: 43°15′N 18°25′E
- Country: Bosnia and Herzegovina
- Entity: Republika Srpska
- Municipality: Gacko
- Time zone: UTC+1 (CET)
  - Summer (DST): UTC+2 (CEST)

Domrke (Serbian Cyrillic: Домрке) is a village in the municipality of Gacko, Republika Srpska, Bosnia and Herzegovina.
