= Drugovići, Gacko =

Drugovići Друговићи
- Village
- Location within Bosnia and Herzegovina
- Coordinates: 43°07′54″N 18°29′39″E
- Country: Bosnia and Herzegovina
- Entity: Republika Srpska
- Municipality: Gacko
- Time zone: UTC+1 (CET)
  - Summer (DST): UTC+2 (CEST)

Drugovići (Serbian Cyrillic: Друговићи) is a village in the municipality of Gacko, Republika Srpska, Bosnia and Herzegovina.
