= Danići =

Danići Данићи
- Village
- Location within Bosnia and Herzegovina
- Coordinates: 43°04′19″N 18°34′08″E
- Country: Bosnia and Herzegovina
- Entity: Republika Srpska
- Municipality: Gacko
- Time zone: UTC+1 (CET)
  - Summer (DST): UTC+2 (CEST)

Danići (Serbian Cyrillic: Данићи) is a village in the municipality of Gacko, Republika Srpska, Bosnia and Herzegovina.
