= Jugovići, Gacko =

Jugovići Југовићи
- Village
- Location within Bosnia and Herzegovina
- Coordinates: 43°16′N 18°26′E
- Country: Bosnia and Herzegovina
- Entity: Republika Srpska
- Municipality: Gacko

Population (2013)
  - Total: 15
- 100% of the village is Serbian
- Time zone: UTC+1 (CET)
  - Summer (DST): UTC+2 (CEST)

Jugovići (Serbian Cyrillic: Југовићи) is a village in the municipality of Gacko, Republika Srpska, Bosnia and Herzegovina. The village is named after the heroic Serbian Jugović brothers who were knights that fought and broke through the ottoman empire's lines at the Battle of Kosovo
