= Fazlagić Tower =

Tower near Gacko, Bosnia

Coordinates: 43°10′N 18°32′E

Fazlagić Tower (Bosnian: Fazlagića Kula) is a ruined tower located near Gacko in eastern Bosnia and Herzegovina.

Fazlagić Tower is approximately 6 kilometres (4 mi) from Gacko, and is at the south periphery of Kuljsko Field. It was built in the 17th century by Ahmed Fazlagić.

== Notes ==
- Fazlagića Kula had once been a mosque in time but is not currently.
- Fazlagića Kula is also known as the last occupied territory of NDH (Nezavisna Država Hrvatska, Independent State of Croatia).
- The whole area, in which there are nine villages, is called Fazlagića Kula.

== See also ==
- List of castles in Bosnia and Herzegovina
