= Kazanci, Bosnia and Herzegovina =

Kazanci Казанци
- Village
- Location within Bosnia and Herzegovina
- Coordinates: 43°03′44″N 18°39′08″E
- Country: Bosnia and Herzegovina
- Entity: Republika Srpska
- Municipality: Gacko
- Time zone: UTC+1 (CET)
  - Summer (DST): UTC+2 (CEST)

Kazanci (Serbian Cyrillic: Казанци) is a village in the municipality of Gacko, Republika Srpska, Bosnia and Herzegovina.

== See also ==
- Tešan Podrugović
