= Gareva =

Gareva Гарева
- Village
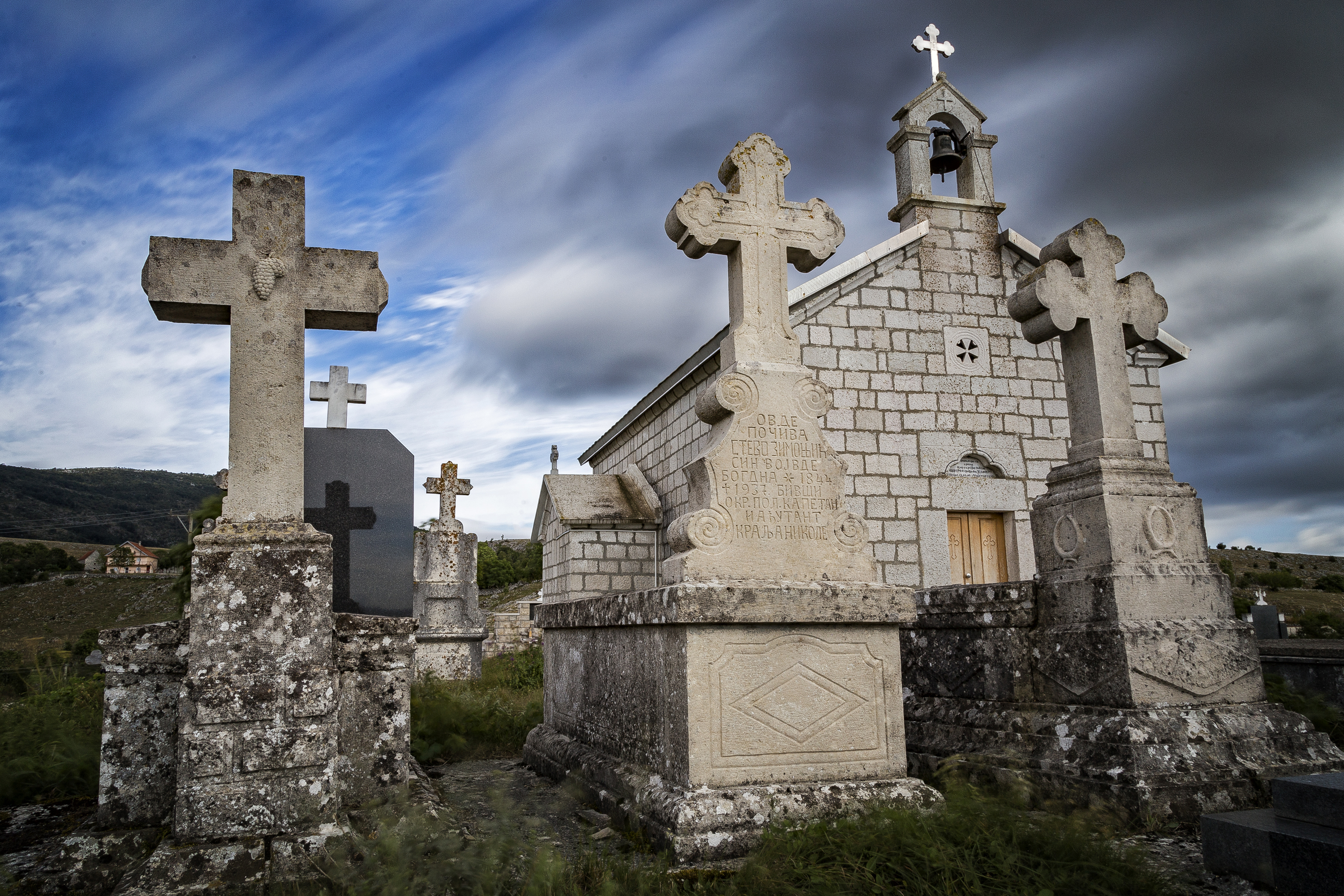
- Church in Gareva

- Location within Bosnia and Herzegovina
- Coordinates: 43°06′14″N 18°36′19″E
- Country: Bosnia and Herzegovina
- Entity: Republika Srpska
- Municipality: Gacko
- Time zone: UTC+1 (CET)
  - Summer (DST): UTC+2 (CEST)

Gareva (Serbian Cyrillic: Гарева) is a village in the municipality of Gacko, Republika Srpska, Bosnia and Herzegovina.
