= Dramešina =

Dramešina Драмешина
- Village
- Location within Bosnia and Herzegovina
- Coordinates: 43°12′N 18°36′E
- Country: Bosnia and Herzegovina
- Entity: Republika Srpska
- Municipality: Gacko
- Time zone: UTC+1 (CET)
  - Summer (DST): UTC+2 (CEST)

Dramešina (Serbian Cyrillic: Драмешина) is a village in the municipality of Gacko, Republika Srpska, Bosnia and Herzegovina.
