= Gacko =

Gacko Гацко
- Town and municipality
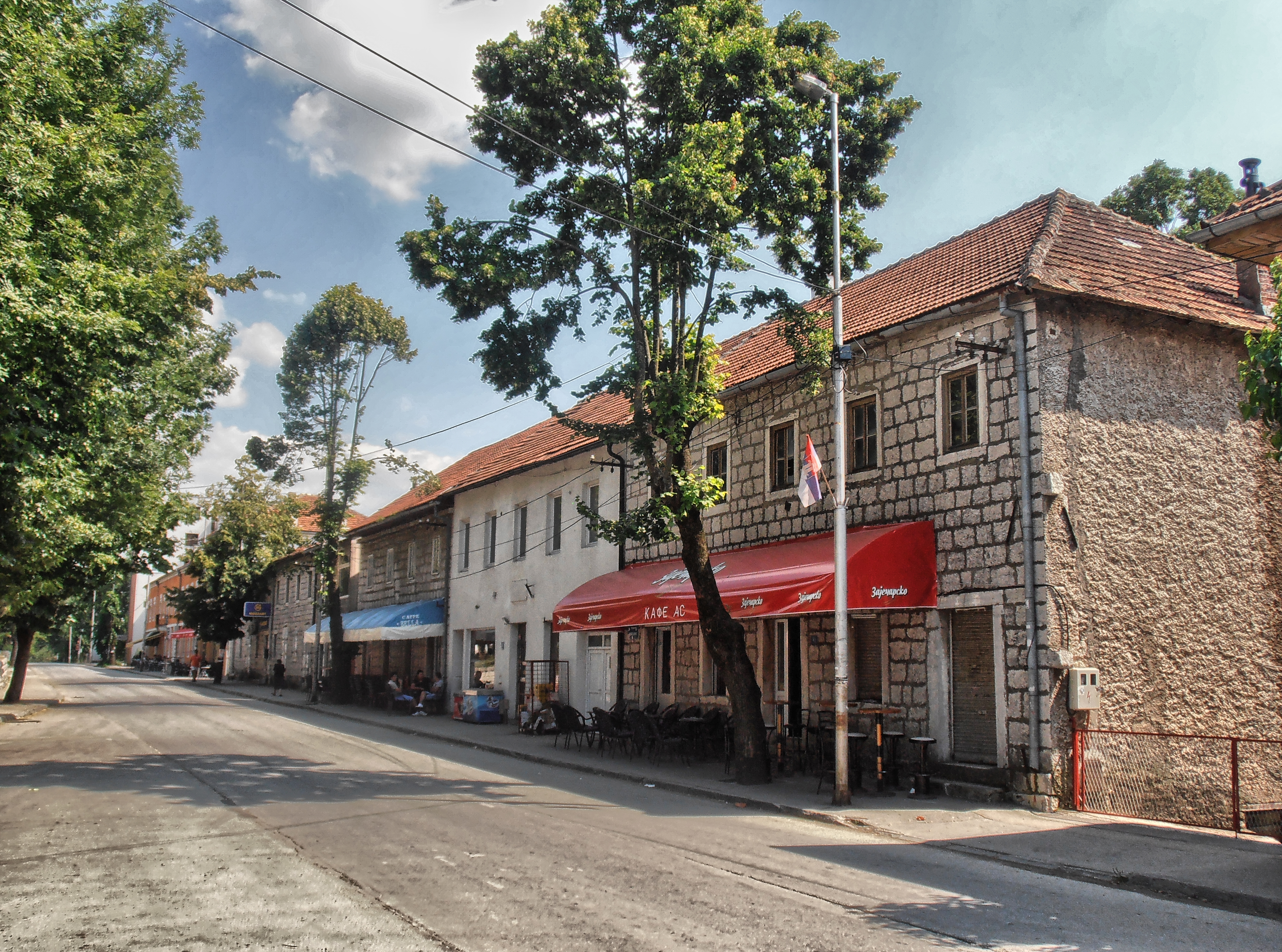
- Gacko

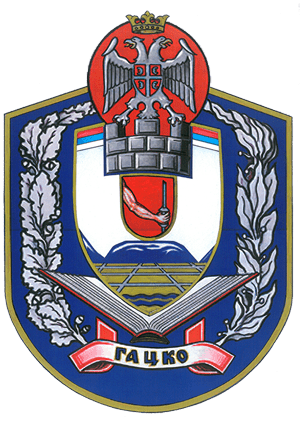
- Coat of arms

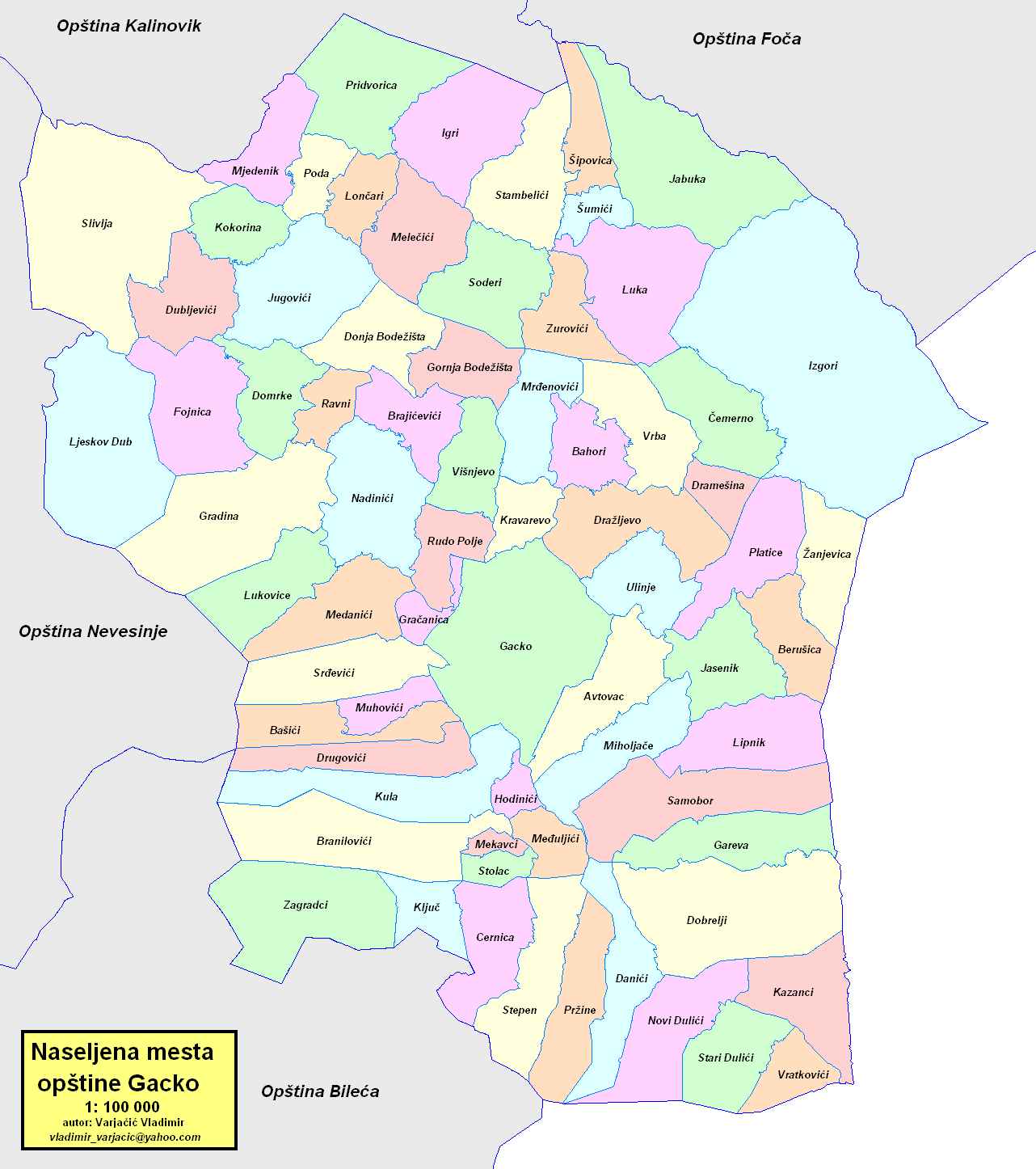
- Coordinates: 43°10′N 18°32′E
- Country: Bosnia and Herzegovina
- Entity: Republika Srpska
- Geographical region: Herzegovina
- Boroughs: 71 (as of 2008)

Government
  - Municipal mayor: Vukota Govedarica (Ind.)
  - Municipality: 735.88 km^{2} (284.12 sq mi)

Population (2013 census)
  - Town: 5,784
  - Municipality: 8,990
  - Municipality density: 12.2/km^{2} (31.6/sq mi)
- Time zone: UTC+1 (CET)
  - Summer (DST): UTC+2 (CEST)
- Area code: 59

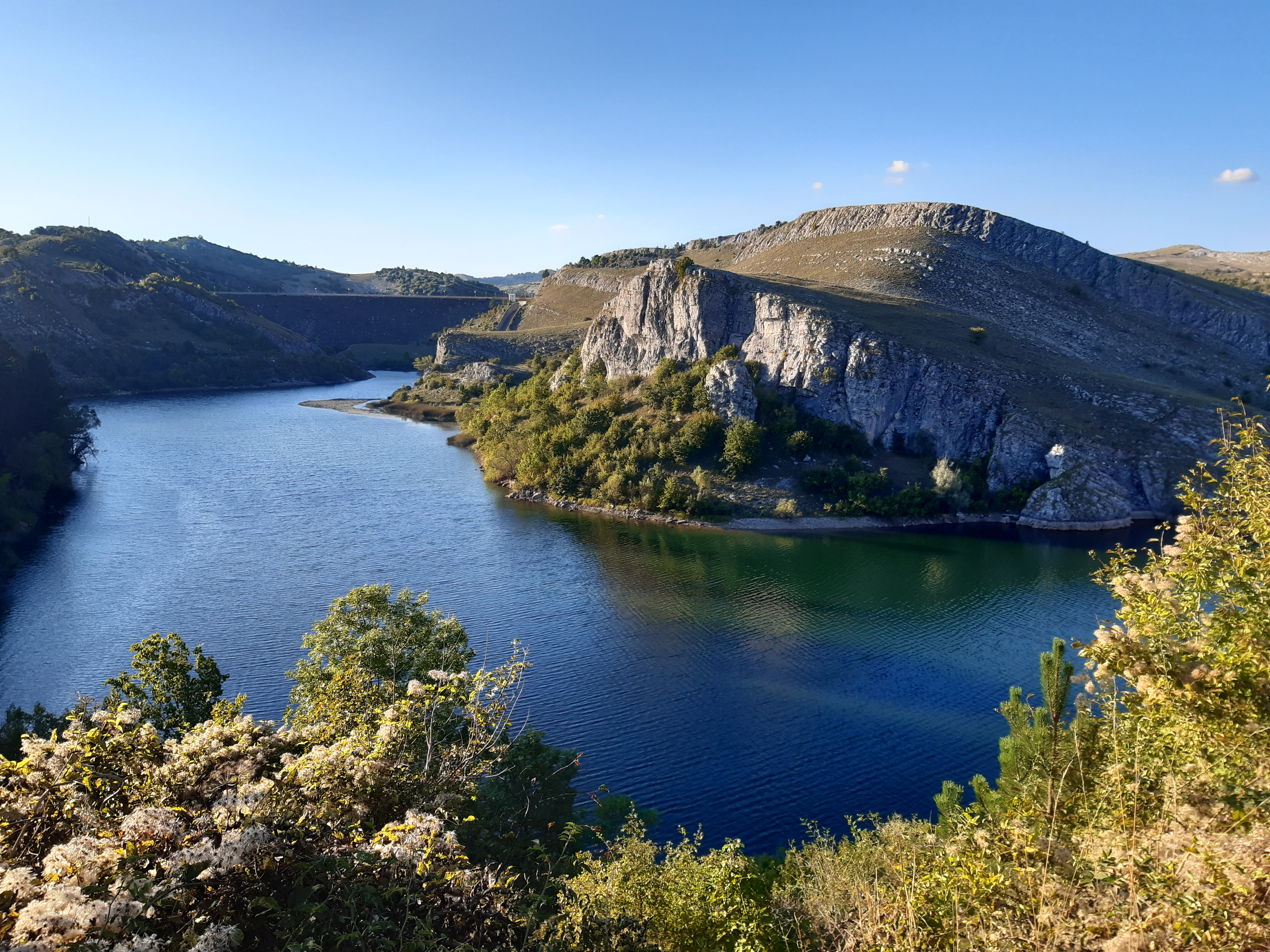
Klinje lake

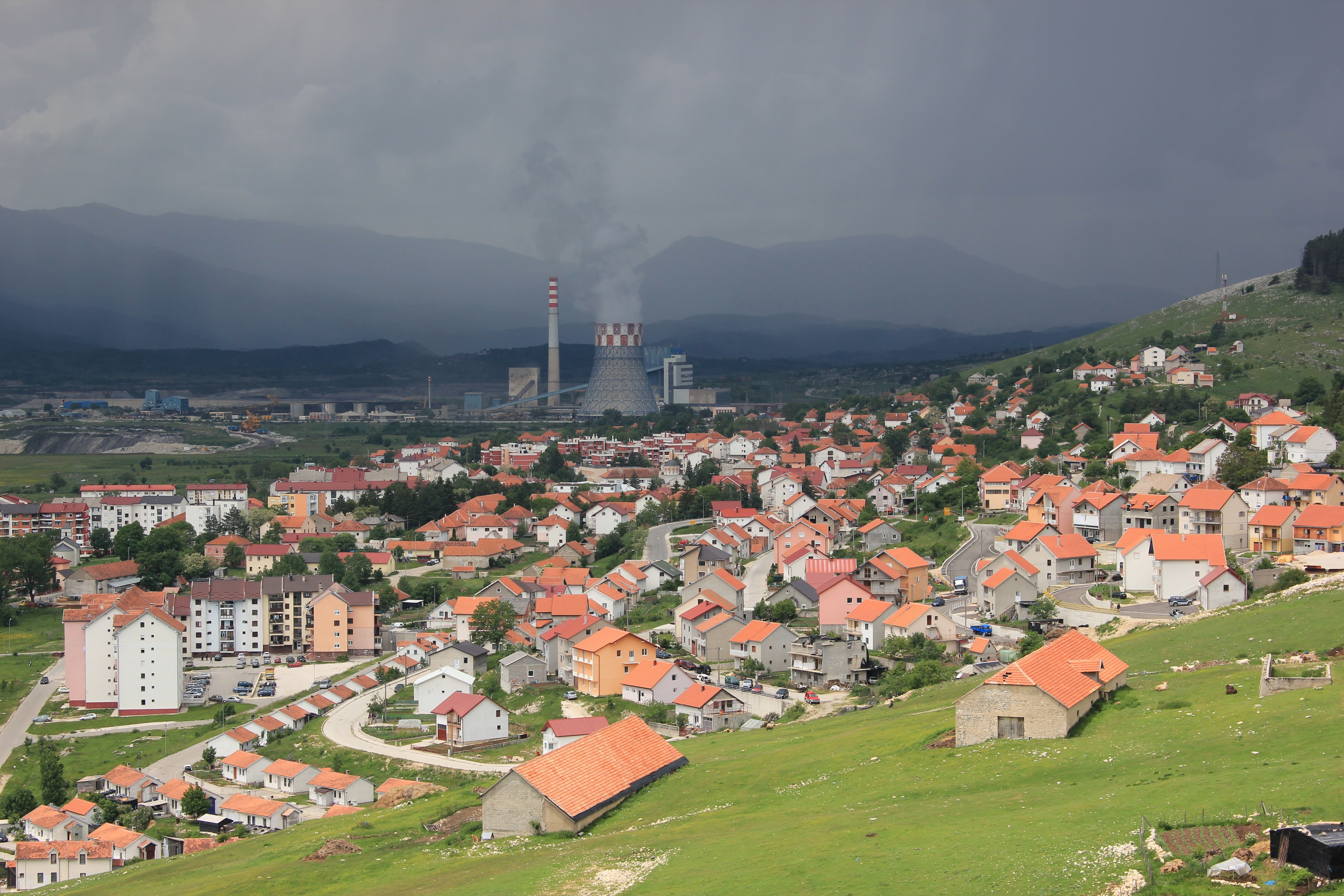
Gacko

Gacko (Serbian Cyrillic: Гацко) is a town and municipality in Republika Srpska, Bosnia and Herzegovina. It is situated in the region of East Herzegovina. As of 2013, the town has a population of 5,784 inhabitants, while the municipality has 8,990 inhabitants.

== Geography ==
The municipality covers an area of 736 km^{2} (284 sq mi), making it one of the largest municipalities in Bosnia and Herzegovina.

The town is near the state border with Montenegro.

== History ==
=== Middle Ages ===
In the 14th century the region was governed by the powerful Vojinović family.

In 1359, veliki čelnik Dimitrije controlled the region.

=== Ottoman period ===
The rebels were defeated at the field of Gacko. This was ultimately due to the lack of foreign support.

=== Modern history ===
Austro-Hungarian authorities took it over in 1878, a decision which was made at the Berlin Congress. In 1908, Austria-Hungary annexed Bosnia and Herzegovina sparking the Bosnian Crisis, which eventually led to World War I.

The Croatian fascist Ustaše movement committed the Gacko massacre on 4 June 1941. In response, on 6 June 1941 the rebels from Gacko under the command of Orthodox priest Radojica Perišić started the uprising against the Independent State of Croatia known as the June 1941 uprising in eastern Herzegovina. The first Partisan battalion established in Gacko at the end of 1941 was named "6th June" in honor of the first date of the uprising. During the period after the Fall of the Berlin Wall, the Gacko municipality proclaimed 6 June as their holiday in honor of the beginning of the uprising and held public ceremonies on 6 June named the Day of Gacko.

When the German and Italian Zones of Influence were revised on 24 June 1942, Gacko fell in Zone II, administered civilly by Croatia but militarily by Italy.

== Settlements ==
Aside from the town of Gacko, the municipality includes the following settlements:

- Avtovac
- Bahori
- Bašići
- Berušica
- Brajićevići
- Branilovići
- Cernica
- Čemerno
- Danići
- Dobrelji
- Domrke
- Donja Bodežišta
- Dramešina
- Dražljevo
- Drugovići
- Dubljevići
- Fojnica
- Gareva
- Gornja Bodežišta
- Gračanica
- Gradina
- Hodinići
- Igri
- Izgori
- Jabuka
- Jasenik
- Jugovići
- Kazanci
- Ključ
- Kokorina
- Kravarevo
- Kula
- Lipnik
- Lončari
- Luka
- Lukovice
- Ljeskov Dub
- Medanići
- Međuljići
- Mekavci
- Melečići
- Miholjače
- Mjedenik
- Mrđenovići
- Muhovići
- Nadinići
- Novi Dulići
- Platice
- Poda
- Pridvorica
- Pržine
- Ravni
- Rudo Polje
- Samobor
- Slivlja
- Soderi
- Srđevići
- Stambelići
- Stari Dulići
- Stepen
- Stolac
- Šipovica
- Šumići
- Ulinje
- Višnjevo
- Vratkovići
- Vrba
- Zagradci
- Zurovići
- Žanjevica

== Demographics ==
=== Population ===
Population of settlements – Gacko municipality
	Settlement	1879.	1885.	1895.	1910.	1921.	1931.	1948.	1953.	1961.	1971.	1981.	1991.	2013.
	Total	9,295	10,582	12,675	15,107	13,667	15,235	14,424	14,628	13,296	12,033	10,279	10,788	8,990
1	Avtovac												594	261
2	Dobrelji												143	257
3	Gacko							1,527	5,911	1,368	1,604	2,602	4,584	5,784
4	Lipnik												253	214
5	Miholjače												334	604

=== Ethnic composition ===
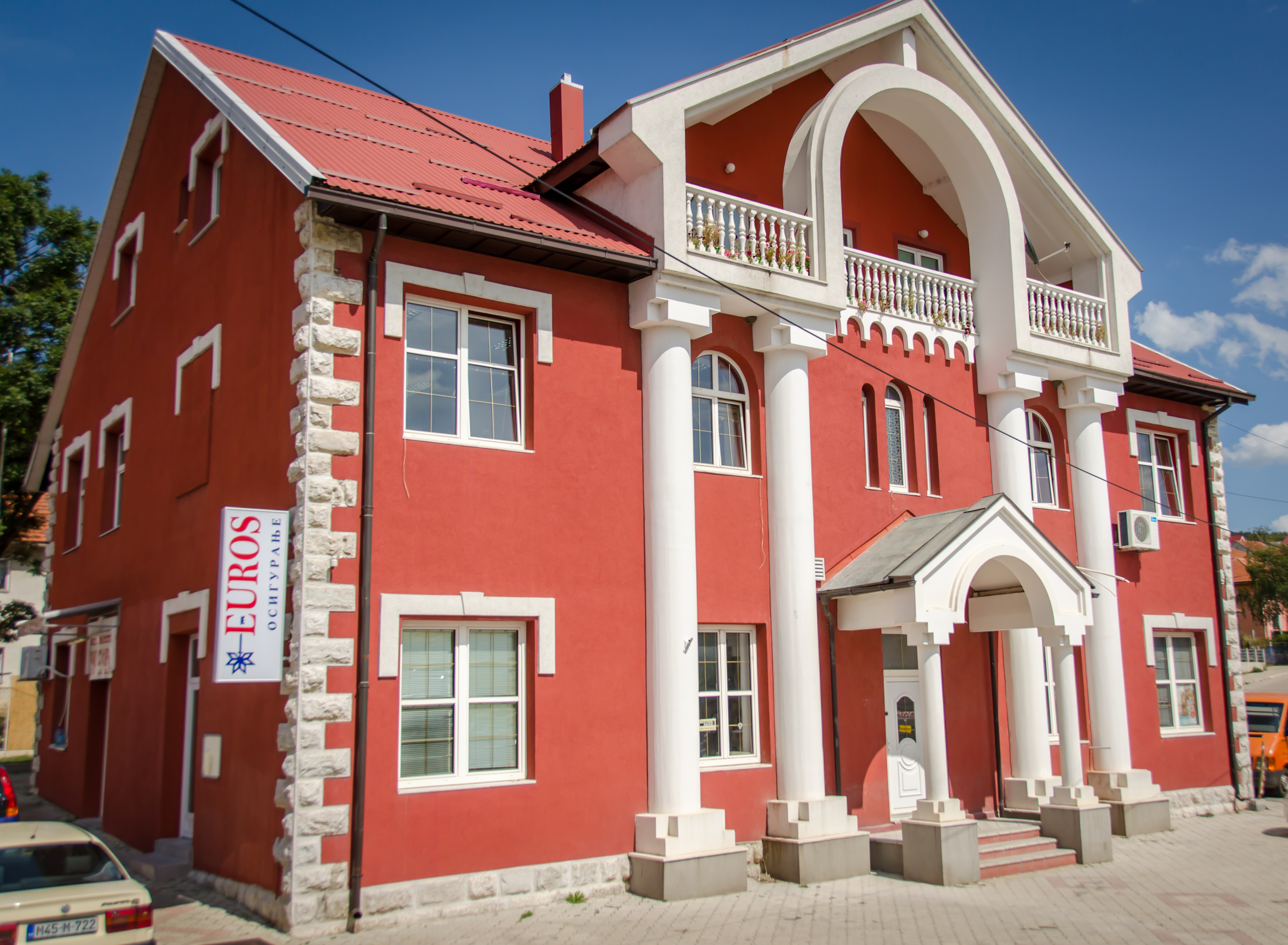
Parish home

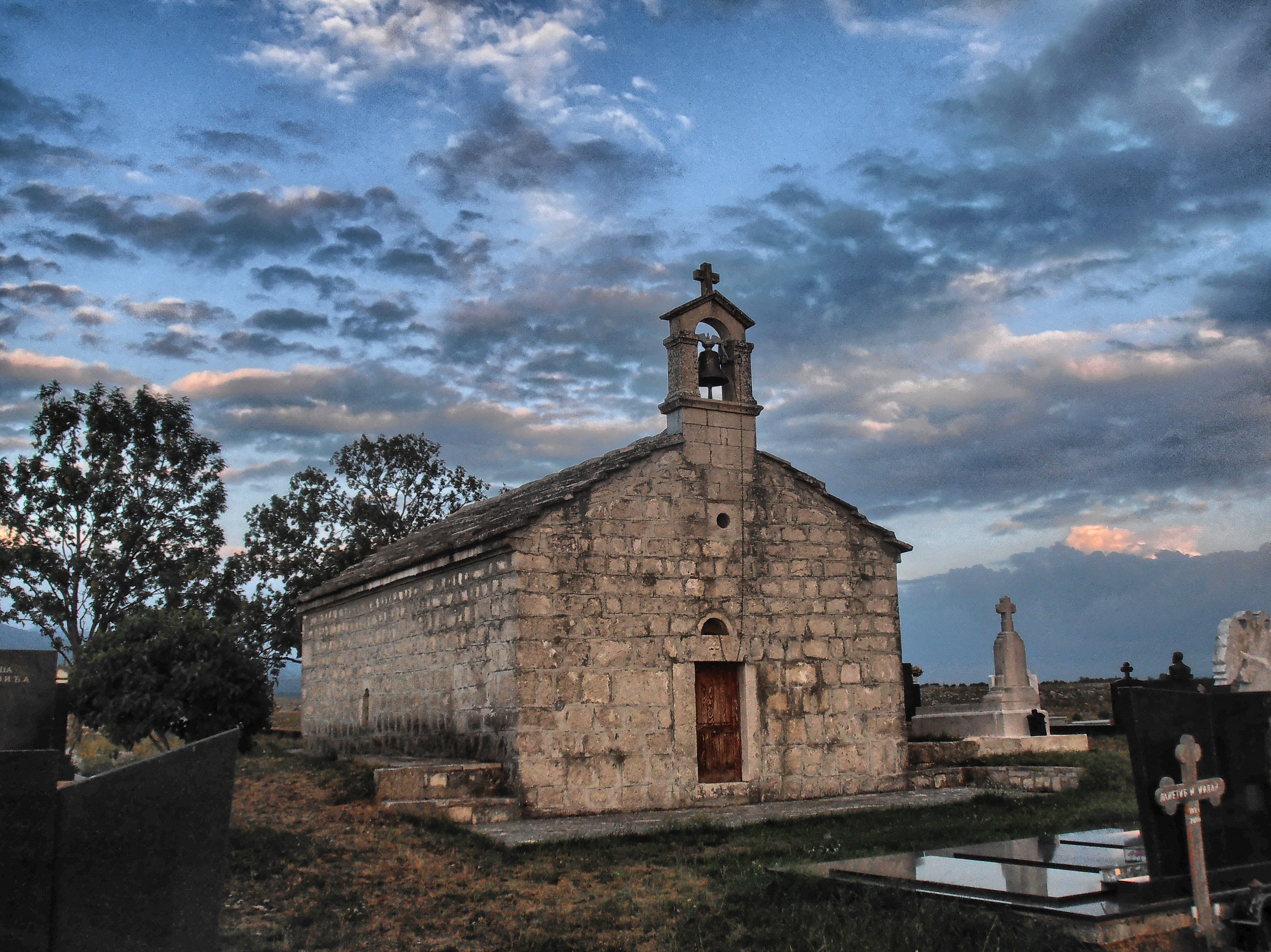
Serbian Orthodox Church in Dobrelji

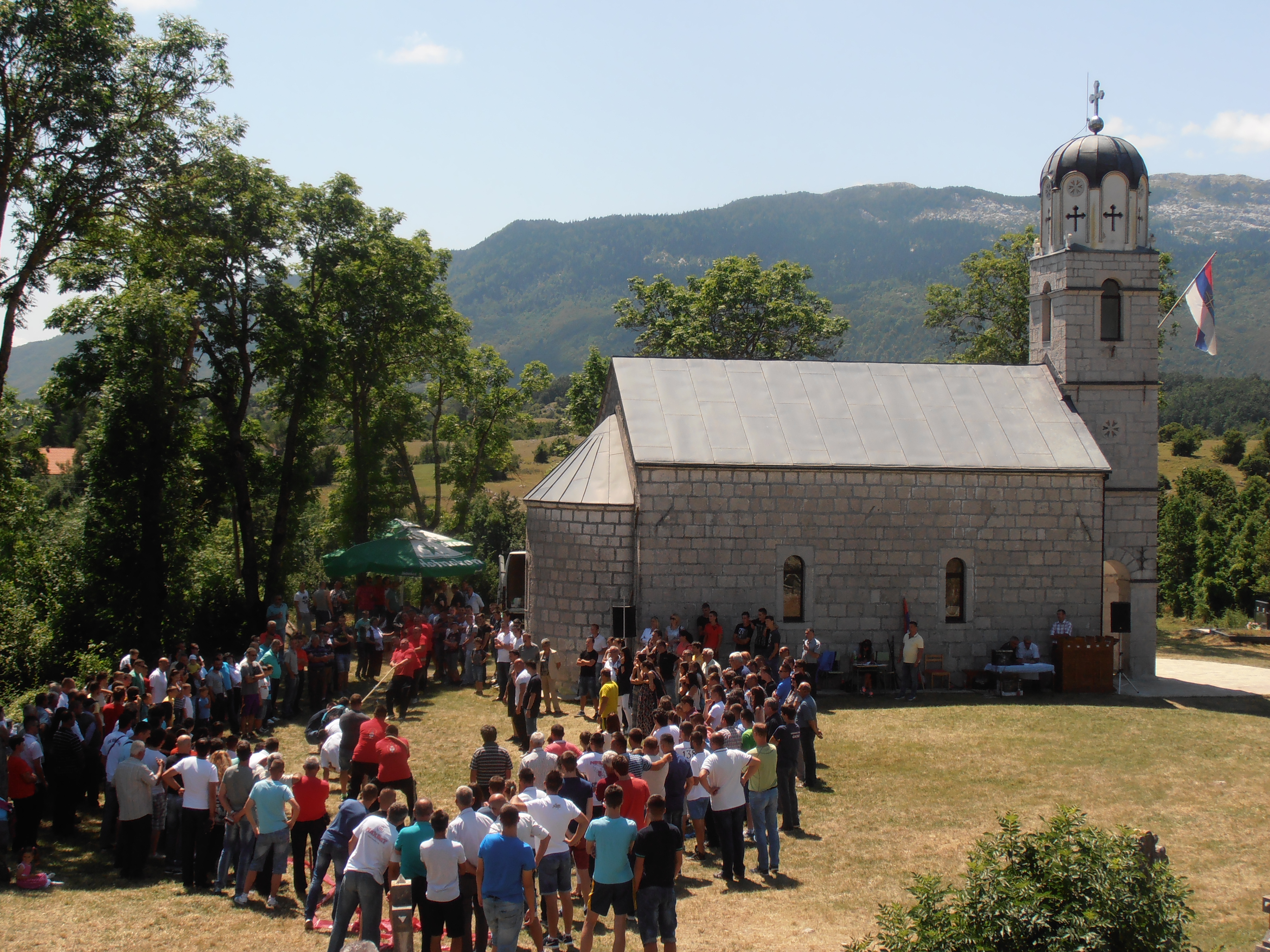
Church of St. Elijah in Nadinići

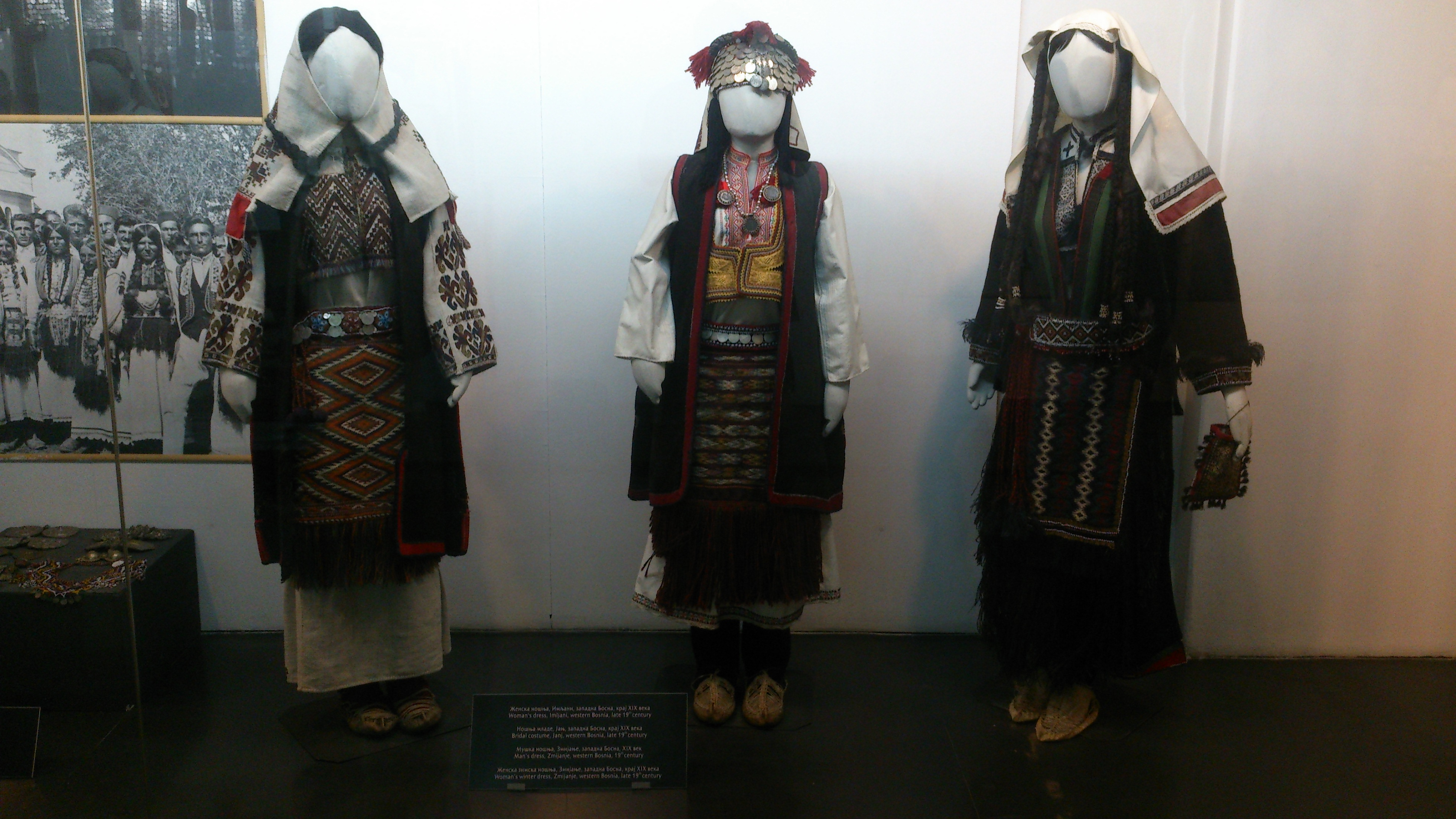
Serbian traditional clothing from Gacko

Ethnic composition – Gacko town
	2013.	1991.	1981.	1971.
Total	5,784 (100,0%)	4,584 (100,0%)	2,602 (100,0%)	1,604 (100,0%)
Bosniaks		2,253 (49,15%)	1,235 (47,46%)	776 (48,38%)
Serbs		2,144 (46,77%)	1,100 (42,28%)	776 (48,38%)
Others		81 (1,767%)	10 (0,384%)	6 (0,374%)
Yugoslavs		78 (1,702%)	207 (7,955%)	15 (0,935%)
Croats		28 (0,611%)	17 (0,653%)	10 (0,623%)
Montenegrins			31 (1,191%)	20 (1,247%)
Macedonians			1 (0,038%)	
Albanians			1 (0,038%)	
Slovenes				1 (0,062%)

Ethnic composition – Gacko municipality
	2013.	1991.	1981.	1971.
Total	8,990 (100,0%)	10,788 (100,0%)	10,279 (100,0%)	12,033 (100,0%)
Serbs	8,556 (95,17%)	6,661 (61,74%)	6,215 (60,46%)	7,634 (63,44%)
Bosniaks	369 (4,105%)	3,858 (35,76%)	3,424 (33,31%)	4,184 (34,77%)
Others	50 (0,556%)	156 (1,446%)	22 (0,214%)	33 (0,274%)
Croats	15 (0,167%)	29 (0,269%)	21 (0,204%)	15 (0,125%)
Yugoslavs		84 (0,779%)	380 (3,697%)	20 (0,166%)
Montenegrins			215 (2,092%)	142 (1,180%)
Macedonians			1 (0,010%)	3 (0,025%)
Albanians			1 (0,010%)	1 (0,008%)
Slovenes				1 (0,008%)

== Economy ==
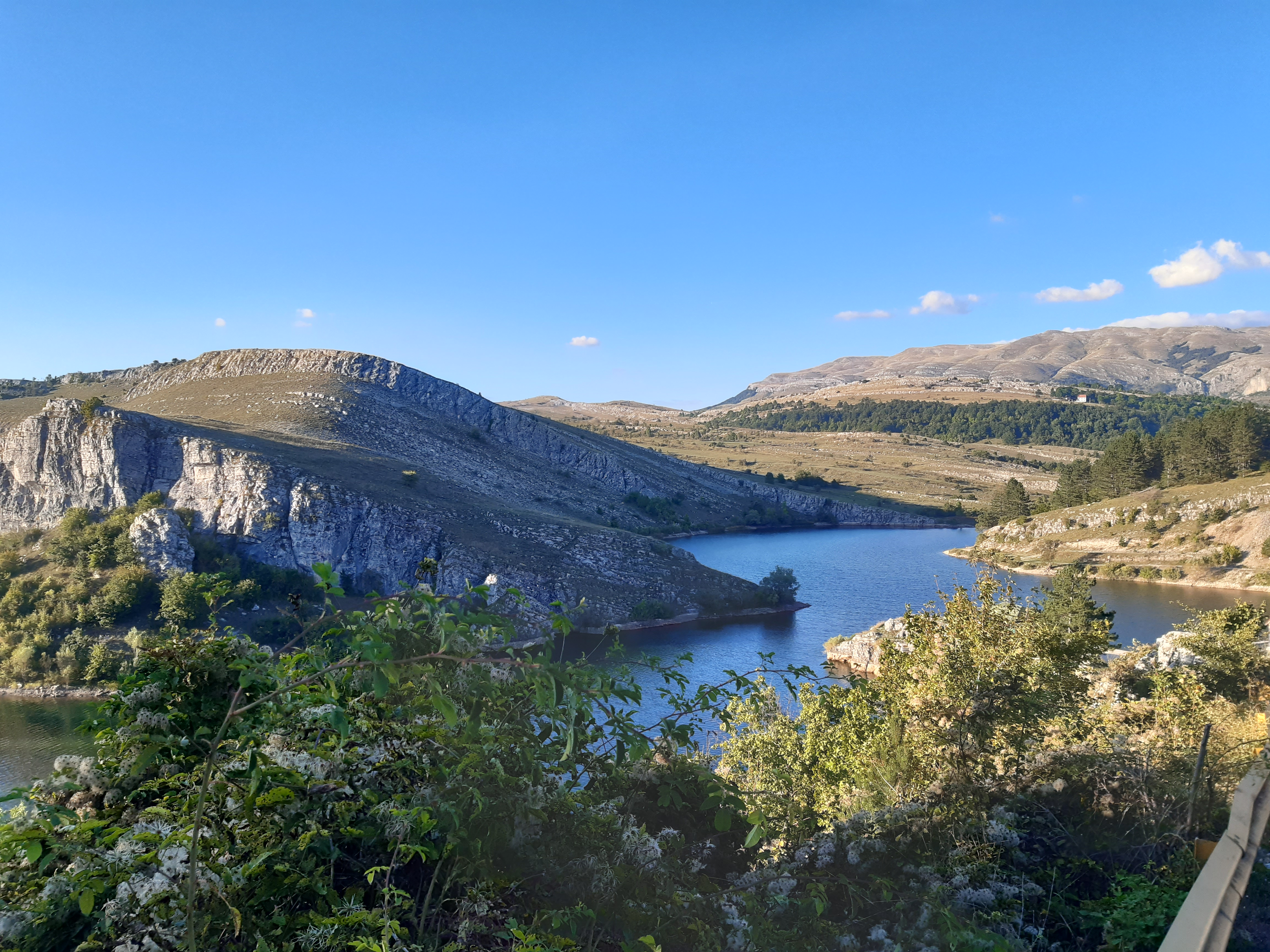
The Dam on the Klinje Lake is the biggest in the municipality

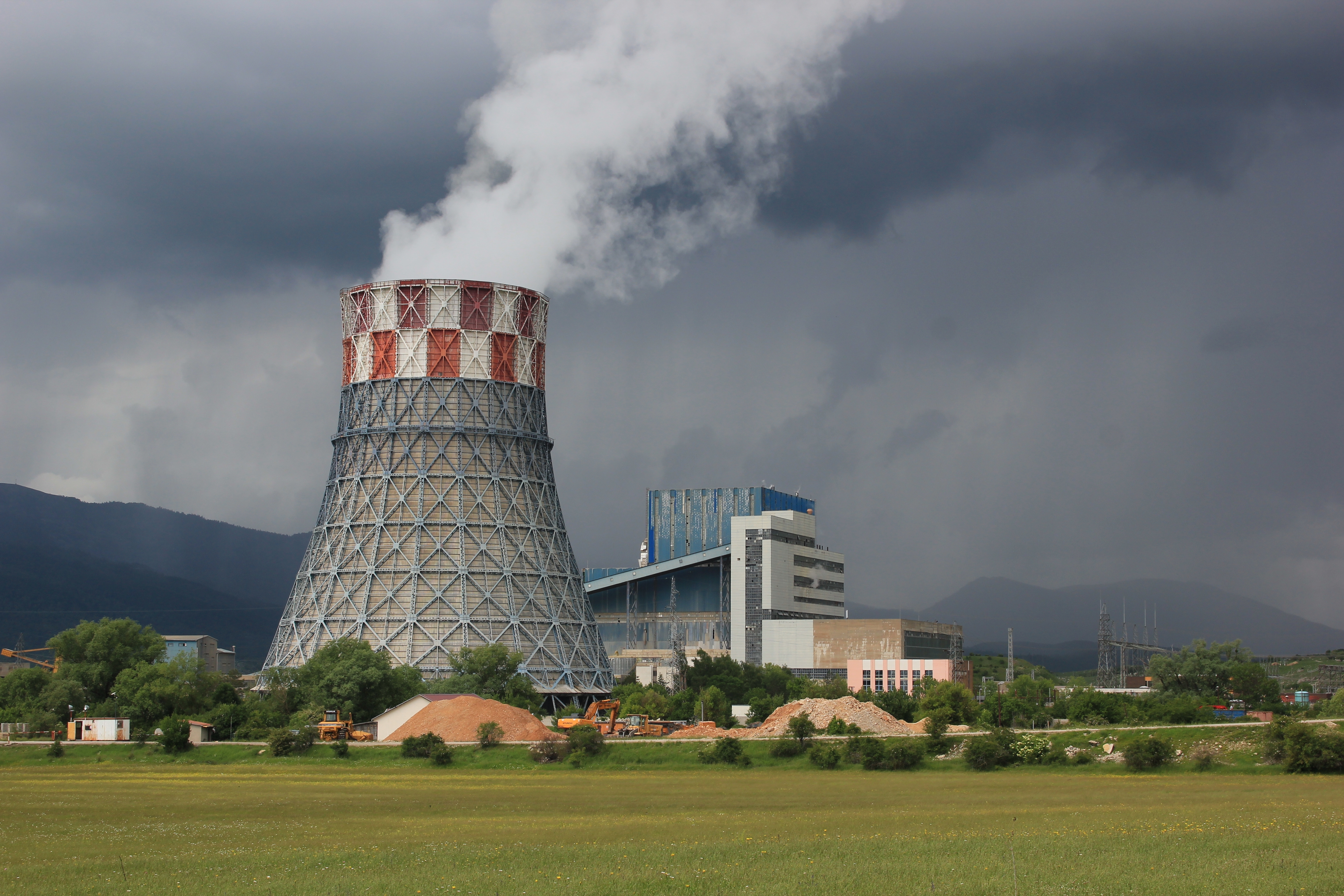
View on the Gacko Thermal Power Plant

The Gacko coal mine and nearby thermoelectric powerplant TPP Gacko are located in the municipality. Both are part of RiTE Gacko a.d., which is the largest employer in the area.

The following table gives a preview of the total number of registered people employed in professional fields per their core activity (as of 2018):

Professional field	Total
Agriculture, forestry and fishing	28
Mining and quarrying	682
Manufacturing	31
Electricity, gas, steam and air conditioning supply	1,246
Water supply; sewerage, waste management and remediation activities	129
Construction	230
Wholesale and retail trade, repair of motor vehicles and motorcycles	155
Transportation and storage	78
Accommodation and food services	75
Information and communication	16
Financial and insurance activities	21
Real estate activities	-
Professional, scientific and technical activities	15
Administrative and support service activities	2
Public administration and defense; compulsory social security	183
Education	185
Human health and social work activities	79
Arts, entertainment and recreation	39
Other service activities	36
Total	3,230

== Sports ==
The local football club, FK Mladost Gacko, plays in the First League of the Republika Srpska.

Volleyball teams, both men's and women's, are among the most successful in Bosnia and Herzegovina, with the women's volleyball team being vice champions multiple times, also winning the Cup of Republika Srpska once.

== Notable people ==
- Admir Ćatović, footballer
- Nemanja Supić, footballer
- Vukašin Višnjevac, football coach
- Vule Avdalović, basketball player
- Nemanja Gordić, basketball player
- Sava Vladislavić, diplomat
- Bogdan Zimonjić, priest and vojvoda (military commander)
- Vojislav Govedarica, actor

== See also ==
- Fazlagić Tower

== Bibliography ==
- Bataković, Dušan T. (1996). The Serbs of Bosnia & Herzegovina: History and Politics. Dialogue Association. ISBN 978-2-911527-10-4.
- HadžiMuhamedović, Safet (2018) Waiting for Elijah: Time and Encounter in a Bosnian Landscape. New York and Oxford: Berghahn Books.
- Trgo, Fabijan, ed. (1964). Zbornik dokumenata i podataka o Narodno-oslobodilačkom ratu Jugoslovenskih naroda. Vol. V, 32.
