= Gračanica, Gacko =

Gračanica Грачаница
- Village
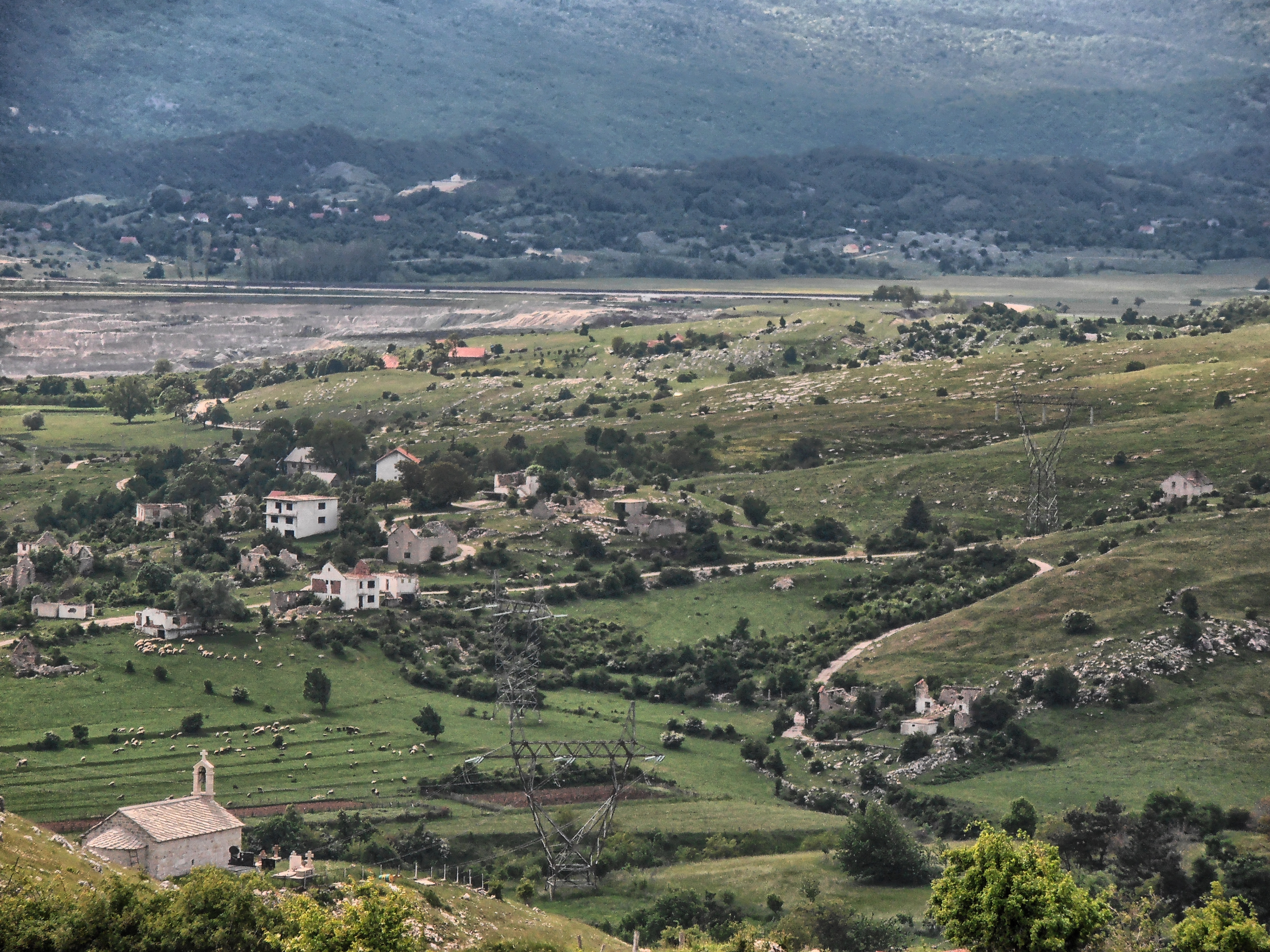

- Location within Bosnia and Herzegovina
- Coordinates: 43°10′33″N 18°30′47″E
- Country: Bosnia and Herzegovina
- Entity: Republika Srpska
- Municipality: Gacko
- Time zone: UTC+1 (CET)
  - Summer (DST): UTC+2 (CEST)

Gračanica (Serbian Cyrillic: Грачаница) is a village in the municipality of Gacko, Republika Srpska, Bosnia and Herzegovina.
