= Srđevići, Gacko =

Srđevići Срђевићи
- Village
- Location within Bosnia and Herzegovina
- Coordinates: 43°10′N 18°29′E
- Country: Bosnia and Herzegovina
- Entity: Republika Srpska
- Municipality: Gacko
- Time zone: UTC+1 (CET)
  - Summer (DST): UTC+2 (CEST)

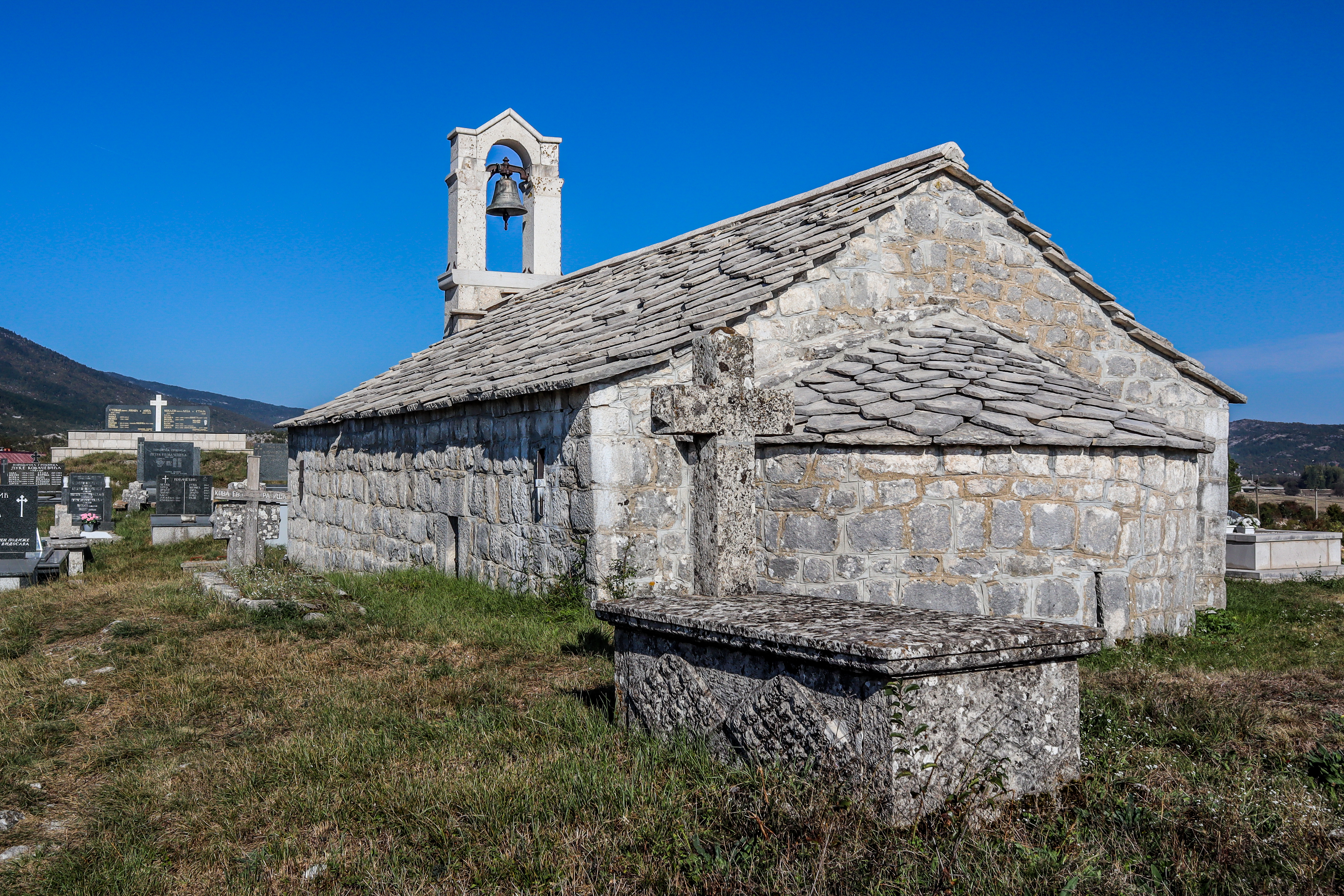
A church in Srđevići

Srđevići (Serbian Cyrillic: Срђевићи) is a village in the municipality of Gacko, Republika Srpska, Bosnia and Herzegovina.

== See also ==
- Church of St. Nicholas, Srđevići
