= Fojnica, Gacko =

Fojnica Фојница
- Village
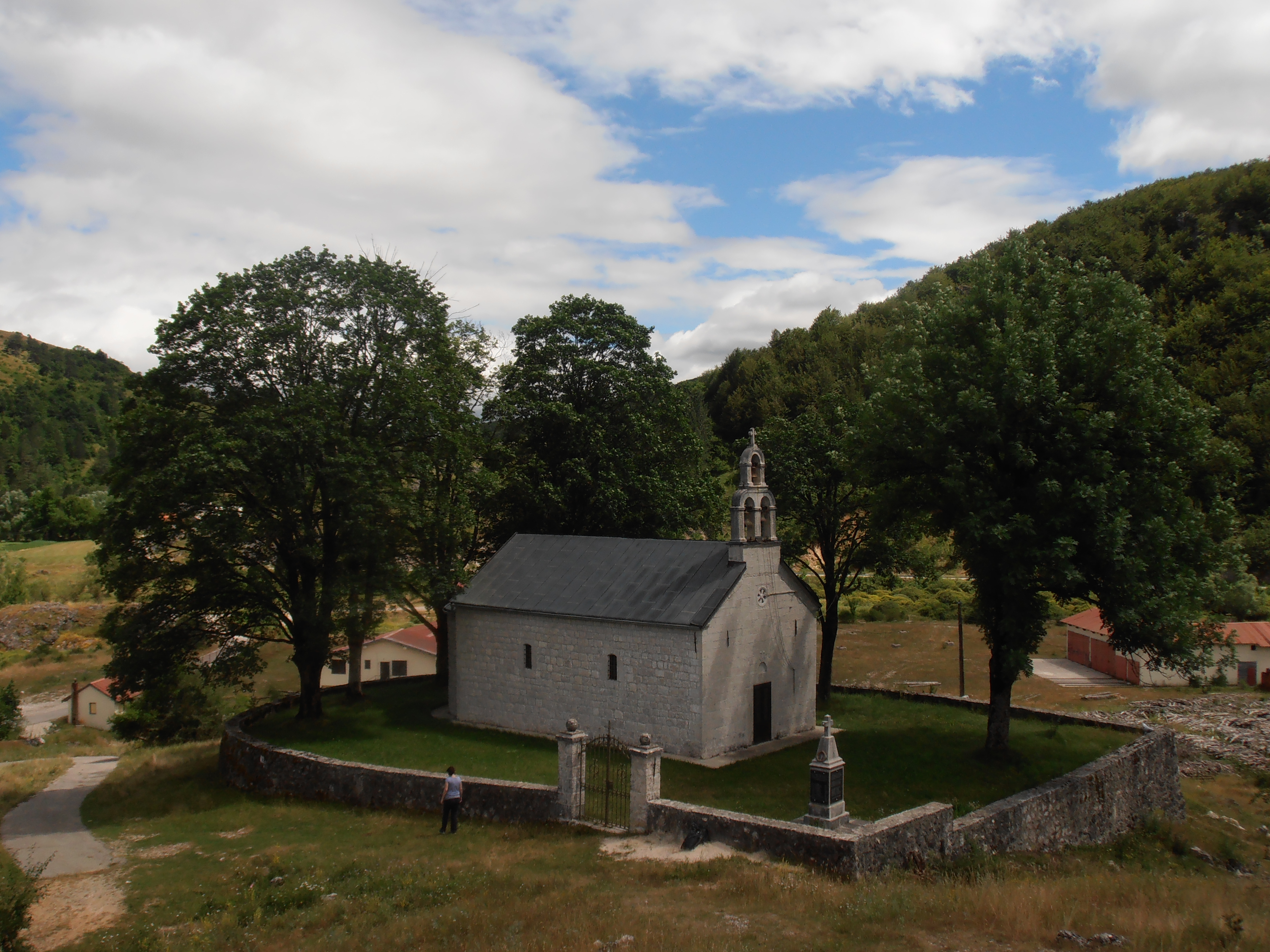

- Location within Bosnia and Herzegovina
- Coordinates: 43°13′45″N 18°24′08″E
- Country: Bosnia and Herzegovina
- Entity: Republika Srpska
- Municipality: Gacko
- Time zone: UTC+1 (CET)
  - Summer (DST): UTC+2 (CEST)

Fojnica (Serbian Cyrillic: Фојница) is a village in the municipality of Gacko, Republika Srpska, Bosnia and Herzegovina.
