= Mile Mećava =

Serbian soldier in WWII

- Миле Мећава
- Born: 1915; Vlaškovci, Austria-Hungary
- Died: 4 June 1942 (aged 26–27); Klekovci, Independent State of Croatia
- Military career
- Allegiance: (Democratic Federal Yugoslavia) Yugoslav Partisans
- Service years: 1941–1942
- Rank: Sergeant
- Unit: Kozara Proletarian Company
- Commands: 1st Proletarian Company
- Conflicts: World War II: Yugoslav People's Liberation War (KIA)
- Awards: Order of the People's Hero

Mile Mećava (Serbian Cyrillic: Миле Мећава, pronounced [mǐlě mětɕaʋa]; 1915 – 4 June 1942) was a Yugoslav Partisan and a hero from World War II.

== Early life ==
Mećeva was born in 1915 in a Serbian family from the village Vlaškovci, in the Condominium of Bosnia and Herzegovina, in Austria-Hungary. His father Ostoja was a farmer. Also, he worked as the farmer before the War. Mećeva joined the Communist Party in 1941.

== World War II ==
Mećeva joined Yugoslav People's Liberation War in early 1941. In the first battles that took place in Aginci and Komlenac, he emerged as one of the bravest fighters of the Second Krajina (Kozara) Detachment. His courage stands out in battles on the mount Kozara, near Podgradci, Mrakovica and Turjak as well as near Gradina and Jasenovac. Also, he fought in conflicts on the Prijedor–Banja Luka railway.

=== Ambush in Lipovac ===
In January 1942, Mećeva enters into the Kozara Proletarian Company, a newly formed assault unit led by Kosta Nađ and Mladen Stojanović.

According to Nađ, the split between the Partisans and the Chetniks in Bosanska Krajina and central Bosnia began on 14 December 1941 in the village of Javorani. Lazar Tešanović, a schoolteacher in Javorani, influenced members of the local Partisan unit to join the Chetnik side. Tešanović then organised a Chetnik unit of about 70 to 80 men, and at the beginning of March 1942, he and his men were in the village of Lipovac. On 5 March, Mećava and his Kozara Proletarian Company led by Stojanović, Nađ, and Danko Mitrov (the commander of the 4th Krajina Detachment) set out for Lipovac.

According to some sources, they went to Lipovac for pre-arranged negotiations with Tešanović, while other sources state that they intended to disarm Tešanović and his Chetniks. When the column of the Partisans approached the school in Lipovac, they were ambushed by Chetniks, and Mećava was wounded as well as Stojanović, who was severely wounded in the head. The Partisans remained pinned down by Chetniks fire until evening; thirteen were killed and eight beside Mećava and Stojanović were wounded. At nightfall, he and the other wounded were transported to the Partisan field hospital in Jošavka.

=== Battle of Dubica and death ===
On 1 June 1942, the Ustaše Black Legion led by Jure Francetić attacked the Free Territory of Kozara with tanks from Dubica and Jasenovac. In this battle, Mećava entered as a sergeant of the 1st Proletarian Company of the Assault Battalion. In the battle in Klekovci, he dismantled two enemy tanks Fiat L6/40. Mećava has jumped on the first tank and liquidated tank's crew with hand grenades. Although he was hit hard from a neighbouring tank he continued to fight. When he defeated the crew of the second tank, he died of his injuries. His actions have seized two completely correct tanks on the Kadin Jelovac–Sreflije battlefront. These tanks were the first ones of the Partisans on Kozara. After the battle, Radio Free Yugoslavia repeated several times news of the heroism of the Mećava who heroically died on a hostile tank.

=== Aftermath ===
Mećava has posthumously bestowed the National Hero of Yugoslavia. On his behalf, on 24 July 1953, his sister Vukosava received his medal of the Order of the People's Hero.

== Personal life ==
Mećeva had 10 siblings. His brothers Marko, Branko, and Ljuban were killed in the Jasenovac concentration camp in 1942. His youngest sister Vukosava was the only survivor of World War II.

He is not related to fellow Serbian military officer and National Hero of Yugoslavia Petar Mećava.

== Legacy ==
- 10th Moštanica Working Brigade "Mile Mećava" was formed in the summer of 1943. Brigade was engaged in agricultural work.
- A street in the city center of Kozarska Dubica, Bosnia and Herzegovina bears his name.
- In the village Gunjevci, near Kozarska Dubica, is a statue of Mile Mećava. Near the statue is parked an old Yugoslav People's Army tank.

== Awards and decorations ==
Order of the People's Hero

== See also ==
- Mećava (surname)
