= Božići =

Božići may refer to:

- Božići (Kozarska Dubica), a village in Bosnia and Herzegovina
- Božići, Fojnica, a village in Bosnia and Herzegovina
- Božići, Novi Travnik, a village in Bosnia and Herzegovina
- Božići (Srebrenica), a village in Bosnia and Herzegovina
- Božići, Montenegro, a village in Montenegro
