= Knežica =

Knežica may refer to:

- Knežica, Bosnia and Herzegovina, a village near Dubica
- Knežica, Croatia, a village near Dubrovnik
- Knežica (Doljevac), a village in Doljevac municipality, Serbia
- Knežica (Petrovac), a village in Petrovac na Mlavi municipality, Serbia
