= Ševarlije =

Ševarlije may refer to:

- Ševarlije (Kozarska Dubica), a village in Bosnia and Herzegovina
- Ševarlije (Doboj), a village in Bosnia and Herzegovina
