= RTV Kozarska Dubica =

Bosnian cable television channel

- Country: Bosnia and Herzegovina
- Broadcast area: Kozarska Dubica
- Headquarters: Kozarska Dubica

Programming
- Language(s): Serbian
- Picture format: 4:3 576i SDTV

Ownership
- Owner: _{JP “Centar za informisanje i kulturu” K. Dubica}
- Sister channels: Dub Radio

History
- Launched: 1969 _{as Radio stanica Bosanska Dubica}
- Former names: РТВ Козарска Дубица

Links
- Website: www.rtv-kd.com

RTV Kozarska Dubica or РТВ КД is a local Bosnian public cable television channel based in Kozarska Dubica municipality. Program is mainly produced in Serbian.

Dub Radio is also part of public municipality services.
