= Mećava =

Mećava may refer to:

- Mećava (surname)
- Mećava (film) ("Snowstorm"), a 1977 Croatian film
