= Međeđa (Kozarska Dubica) =

- Village
- Location within Bosnia and Herzegovina
- Coordinates: 45°12′16″N 16°57′54″E
- Country: Bosnia and Herzegovina
- Republic: Republika Srpska
- Municipality: Kozarska Dubica

Population (2013)
  - Total: 808
- Time zone: UTC+1 (CET)
  - Summer (DST): UTC+2 (CEST)

Međeđa is a village in the municipality of Kozarska Dubica, Republika Srpska, Bosnia and Herzegovina. The village is mostly inhabited by Serbs.

== Notable people ==
- Philip Zepter, businessman
- Zoran Lončar, politician
- Savo Lončar, politician

== History ==
=== World War II ===
A mass grave of Ustaše victims from the Jasenovac concentration camp, most of whom were children, was located on the estate of the Lončar family in Međeđa. At the decision of the SFR Yugoslavian government in 1956, the mass grave was backfilled to make space for Sava river walls.

In the villages Drakulić, Demirovac, and Međeđa, Ustaše enjoined the young Serbian girls to "pull their skirts up, and pricked them between the legs".

In 1942, Ustaše soldiers ordered inhabitants from the Prijedor canton village of Međeđa and many other neighboring villages to prepare themselves for departure within ten minutes. The 8,000 people who assembled were transported to a barbed wire-enclosed field near the railway station in Hrvatska Dubica. There some of them were executed (by fusillade); the others were sent to concentration camps. Those who survived were, after a long time, sent to Serbia.
