= Dub Radio =

Bosnian radio station

Dub Radio Дуб Радио
Kozarska Dubica; Bosnia and Herzegovina
- Frequency: Kozarska Dubica 96.7 MHz
- Branding: Public

Programming
- Language: Serbian
- Format: Local news, talk and music

Ownership
- Owner: JP "Centar za informisanje i kulturu" Kozarska Dubica

History
- First air date: 1972

Technical information
- Transmitter coordinates: 45°11′N 16°48′E
- Repeater: Kozarska Dubica/Krivdića Brdo

Links
- Webcast: On website
- Website: www.rtv-kd.com

Dub Radio (Serbian Cyrillic: Дуб Радио) is a Bosnian local public radio station, broadcasting from Kozarska Dubica, Bosnia and Herzegovina.

The station was launched as Radio Bosanska Dubica in 1972 by the municipal council of Bosanska Dubica. In Yugoslavia and in SR Bosnia and Herzegovina, it was part of local/municipal Radio Sarajevo network affiliate.

The program is mainly produced in Serbian. Estimated number of potential listeners of Dub Radio is around 19,545. Radiostation is also available in neighboring Croatia.

Local public cable television channel RTV KD is also part of public municipality services.

== See also ==
- List of radio stations in Bosnia and Herzegovina

== Frequencies ==
- Kozarska Dubica/Brod 96.7 MHz
