= Draksenić =

- Village
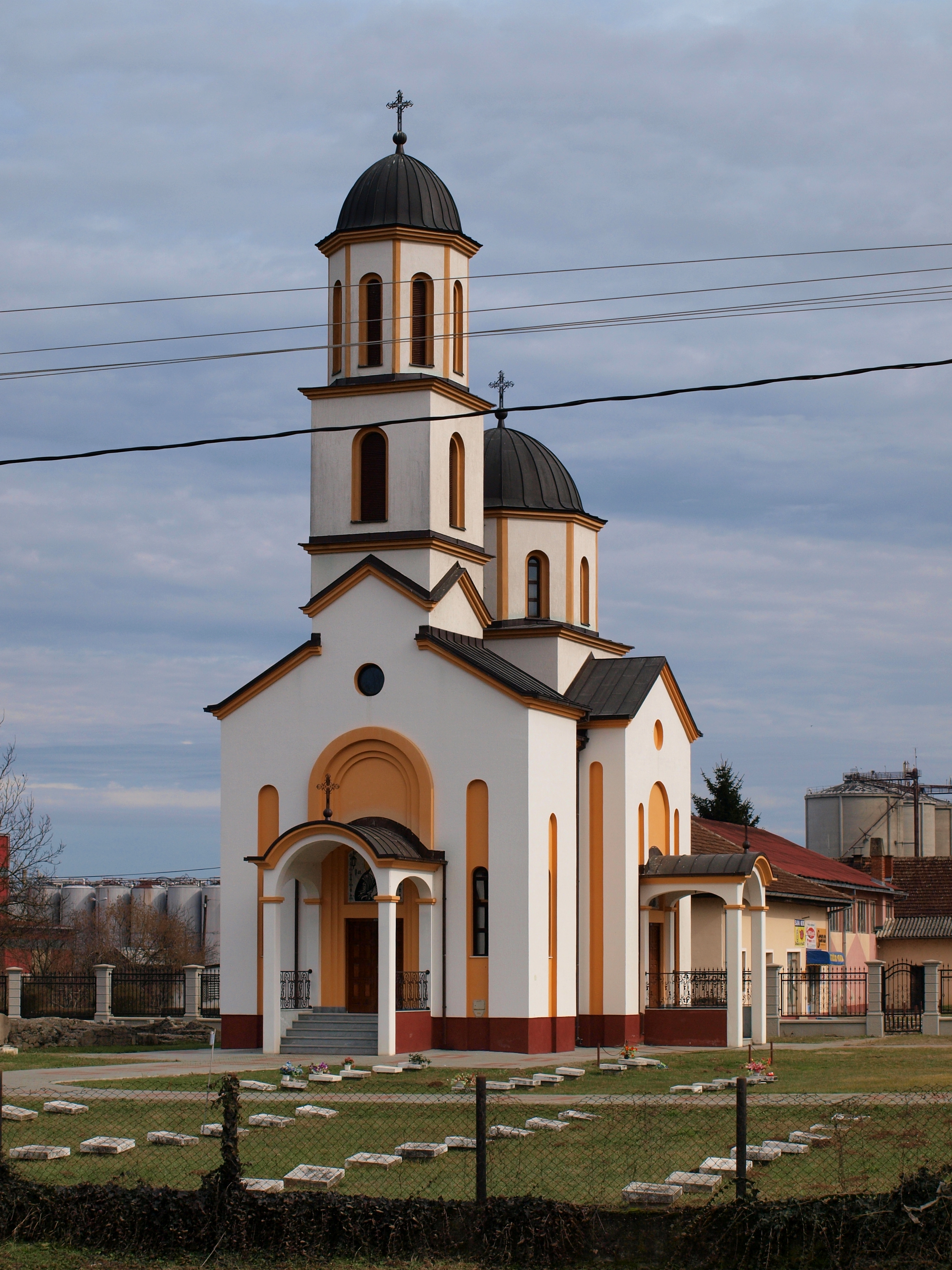
- Serbian orthodox church

- Location within Bosnia and Herzegovina
- Coordinates: 45°12′N 16°54′E
- Country: Bosnia and Herzegovina
- Entity: Republika Srpska
- Municipality: Kozarska Dubica
- Time zone: UTC+1 (CET)
  - Summer (DST): UTC+2 (CEST)

Draksenić (Serbian Cyrillic: Драксенић) is a village in the municipality of Kozarska Dubica, Republika Srpska, Bosnia and Herzegovina.

== History ==
Draksenić was the site of the largest massacre of Serbs in the municipality of Kozarska Dubica during the WWII genocide carried out by the Ustaše. Croatian Home Guard troops burned the village in January 1942, killing more than 200 people.
