= Bjelajci =

Bjelajci Бјелајци
- Village
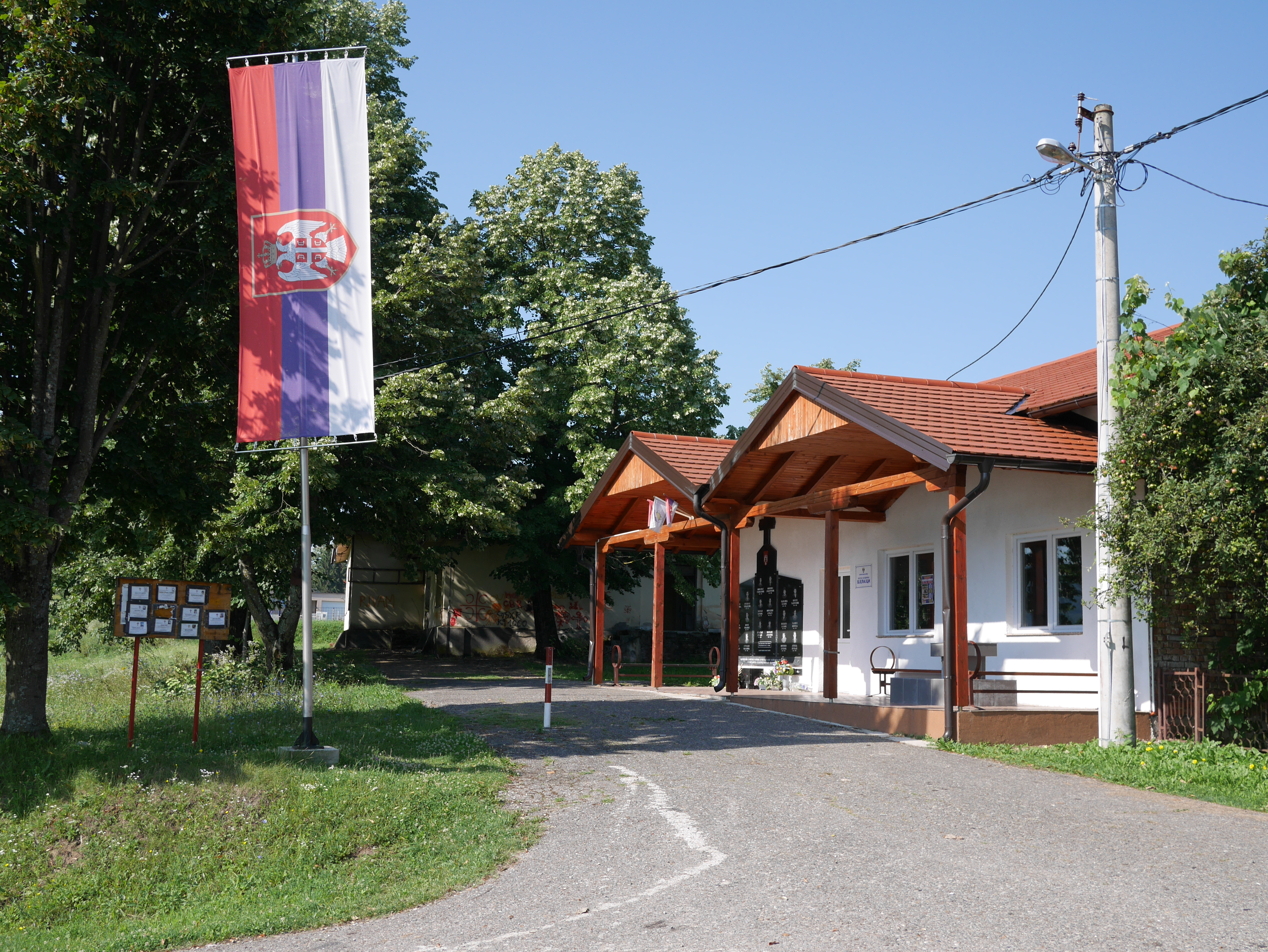

- Location within Bosnia and Herzegovina
- Coordinates: 45°07′13″N 16°48′51″E
- Country: Bosnia and Herzegovina
- Entity: Republika Srpska
- Municipality: Kozarska Dubica

Population (1991)
  - Total: 227
- Time zone: UTC+1 (CET)
  - Summer (DST): UTC+2 (CEST)

Bjelajci (Serbian Cyrillic: Бјелајци) is a village in the municipality of Kozarska Dubica, Republika Srpska, Bosnia and Herzegovina.
