= Vojskova =

- Village
- Location within Bosnia and Herzegovina
- Coordinates: 45°05′43″N 16°54′19″E
- Country: Bosnia and Herzegovina
- Republic: Republika Srpska
- Municipality: Kozarska Dubica
- Time zone: UTC+1 (CET)
  - Summer (DST): UTC+2 (CEST)

Vojskova (Serbian Cyrillic: Војскова) is a village in the municipality of Kozarska Dubica, Republika Srpska, Bosnia and Herzegovina.
