= Hadžibajir =

- Village
- Location within Bosnia and Herzegovina
- Coordinates: 45°09′N 16°49′E
- Country: Bosnia and Herzegovina
- Entity: Republika Srpska
- Municipality: Kozarska Dubica
- Time zone: UTC+1 (CET)
  - Summer (DST): UTC+2 (CEST)

Hadžibajir (Serbian Cyrillic: Хаџибајир) is a village in the municipality of Kozarska Dubica, Republika Srpska, Bosnia and Herzegovina.
