= Rakovica, Kozarska Dubica =

Rakovica
- Village
- Location within Bosnia and Herzegovina
- Coordinates: 45°6′24″N 16°56′4″E
- Country: Bosnia and Herzegovina
- Republic: Republika Srpska
- Municipality: Kozarska Dubica
- Time zone: UTC+1 (CET)
  - Summer (DST): UTC+2 (CEST)

Rakovica is a village in the municipality of Bosanska Dubica, Bosnia and Herzegovina.
