= Vlaškovci =

- Village
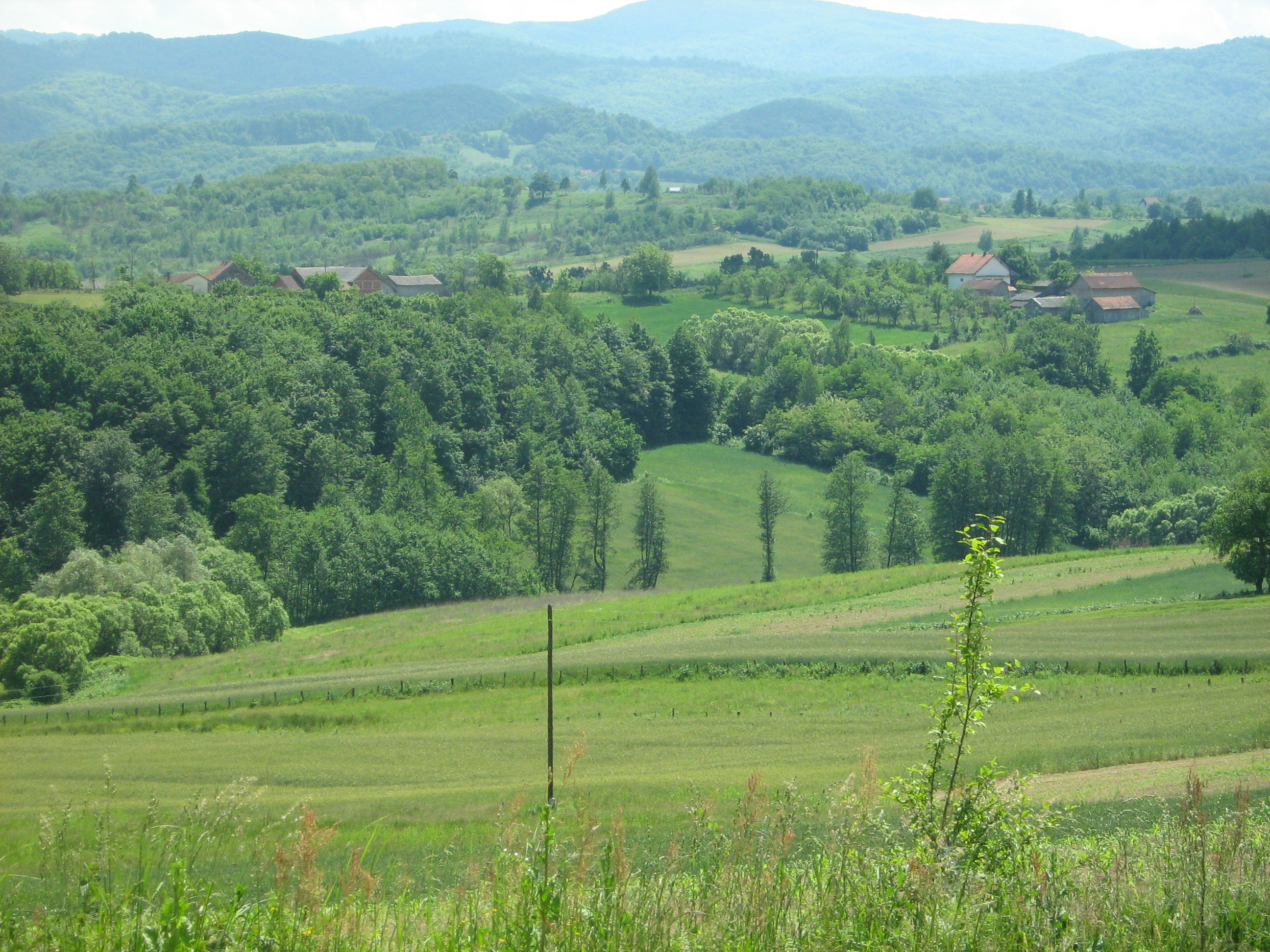

- Location within Bosnia and Herzegovina
- Coordinates: 45°08′N 16°47′E
- Country: Bosnia and Herzegovina
- Entity: Republika Srpska
- Municipality: Kozarska Dubica
- Elevation: 617 ft (188 m)

Population (2013)
  - Total: 196
- Time zone: UTC+1 (CET)
  - Summer (DST): UTC+2 (CEST)
- Area code: 052

Vlaškovci (Serbian Cyrillic: Влашковци) is a village in the north-west Bosnia and Herzegovina in the Republika Srpska. According to the 2013 census, the village had 196 inhabitants. It's a part of the municipality of Kozarska Dubica.

== Notable people ==
- Mile Mećava (1915–1942), a Yugoslav Partisan and a hero from World War II.
