= Maglajci =

- Village
- Location within Bosnia and Herzegovina
- Coordinates: 45°06′00″N 16°48′40″E
- Country: Bosnia and Herzegovina
- Entity: Republika Srpska
- Municipality: Kozarska Dubica
- Time zone: UTC+1 (CET)
  - Summer (DST): UTC+2 (CEST)

Maglajci (Serbian Cyrillic: Маглајци) is a village in the municipality of Kozarska Dubica, Republika Srpska, Bosnia and Herzegovina.
