= Pobrđani, Kozarska Dubica =

Pobrđani Побрђани
- Village
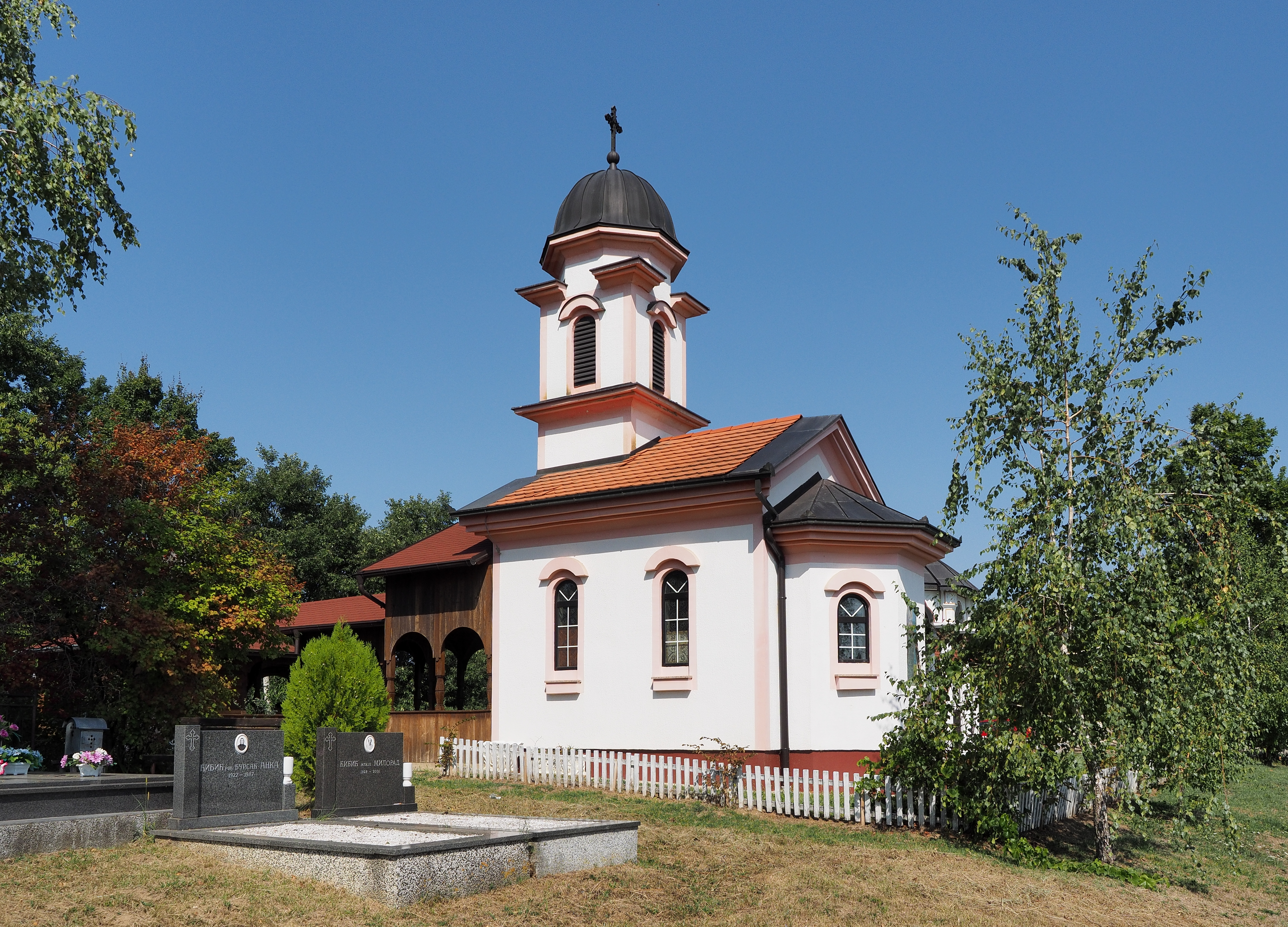
- Orthodox monastery Vasilije Ostroški with cemetery

- Location within Bosnia and Herzegovina
- Coordinates: 45°9′31″N 16°41′55″E
- Country: Bosnia and Herzegovina
- Republic: Republika Srpska
- Municipality: Kozarska Dubica
- Time zone: UTC+1 (CET)
  - Summer (DST): UTC+2 (CEST)

Pobrđani (Cyrillic: Побрђани) is a village in the municipality of Kozarska Dubica, Republika Srpska, Bosnia and Herzegovina.

== Gallery ==
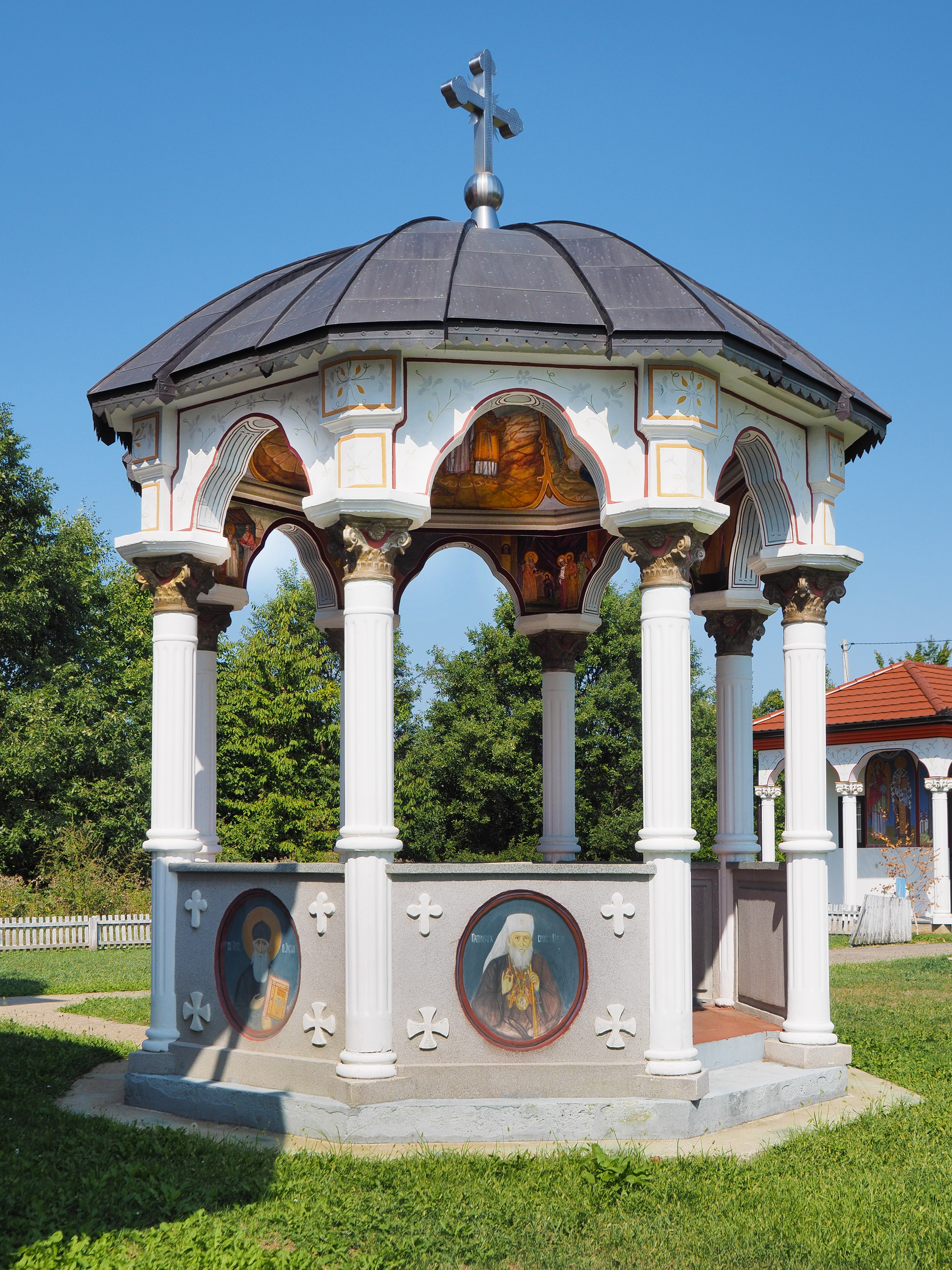
Baptistry is made upon Monastery Hilandar baptistry

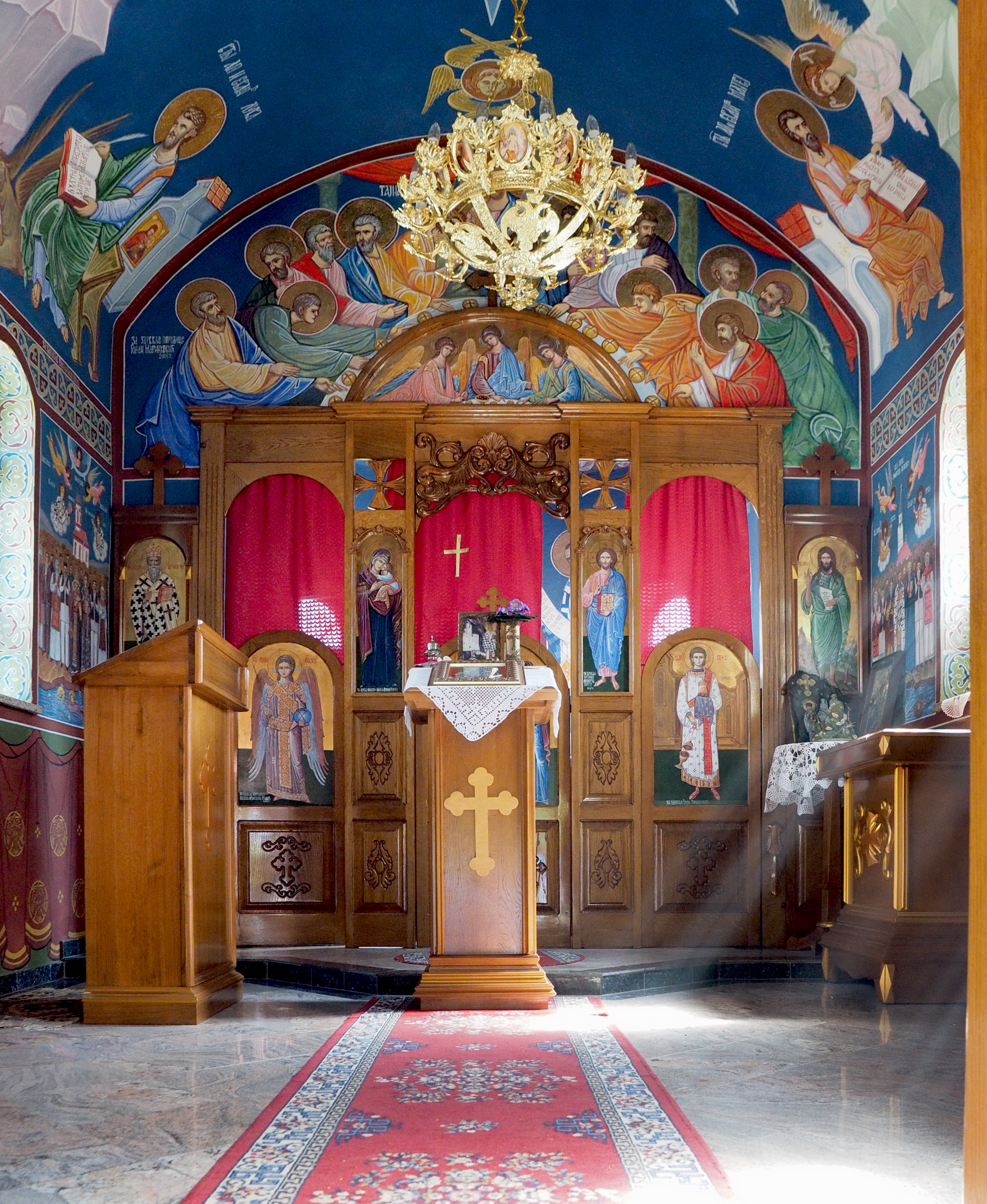
Altar and Iconostasis

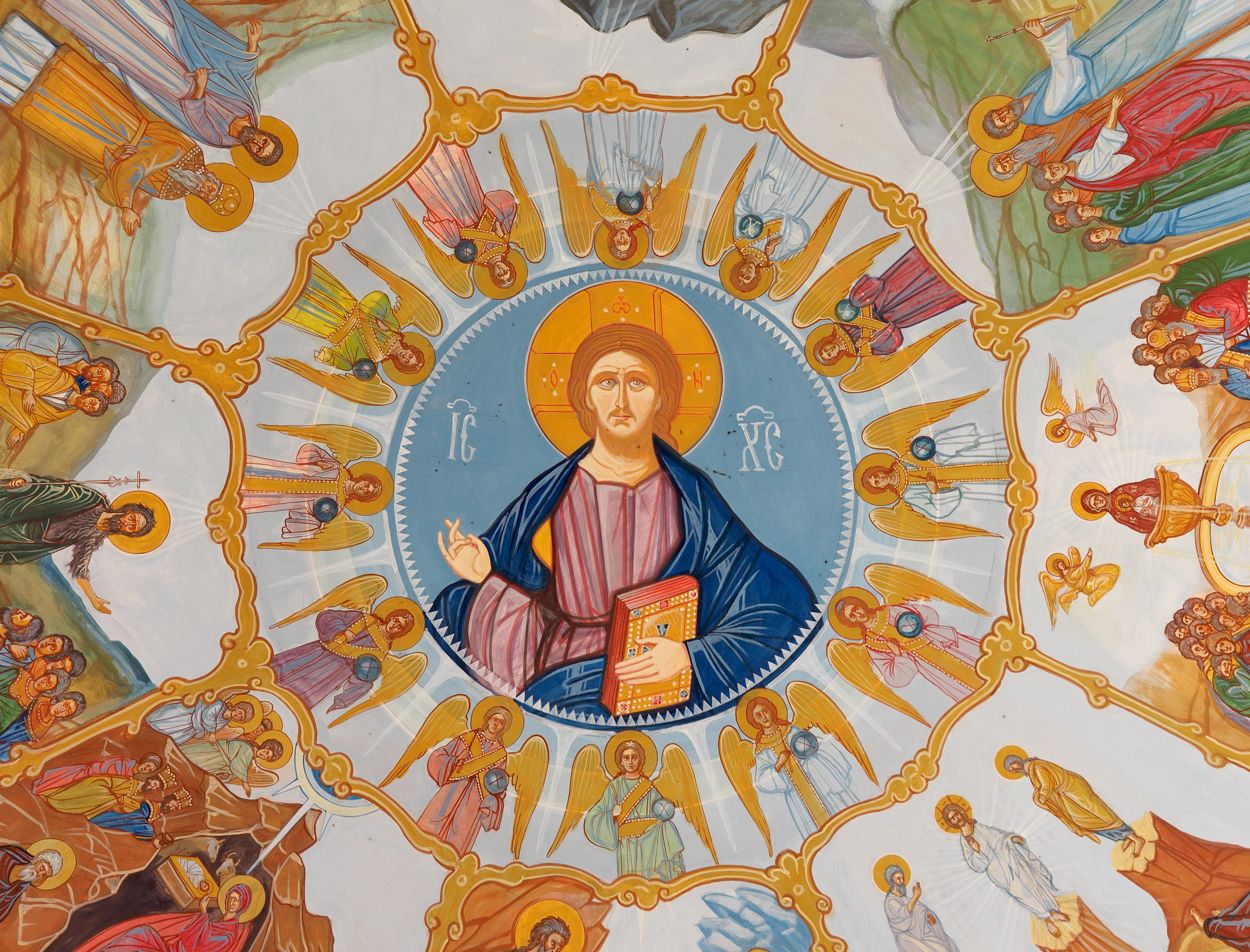
Fresco on the roof of Baptistry
