= Malo Dvorište =

- Village
- Location within Bosnia and Herzegovina
- Coordinates: 45°07′07″N 16°40′41″E
- Country: Bosnia and Herzegovina
- Entity: Republika Srpska
- Municipality: Kozarska Dubica
- Established: 1653

Area
  - Total: 217 sq mi (561 km^{2})

Population
  - Total: 563
- Time zone: UTC+1 (CET)
  - Summer (DST): UTC+2 (CEST)

Malo Dvorište (Serbian Cyrillic: Мало Двориште) is a village in the municipality of Kozarska Dubica, Republika Srpska, Bosnia and Herzegovina.
