= Mlječanica =

Mlječanica Мљечаница
- Village
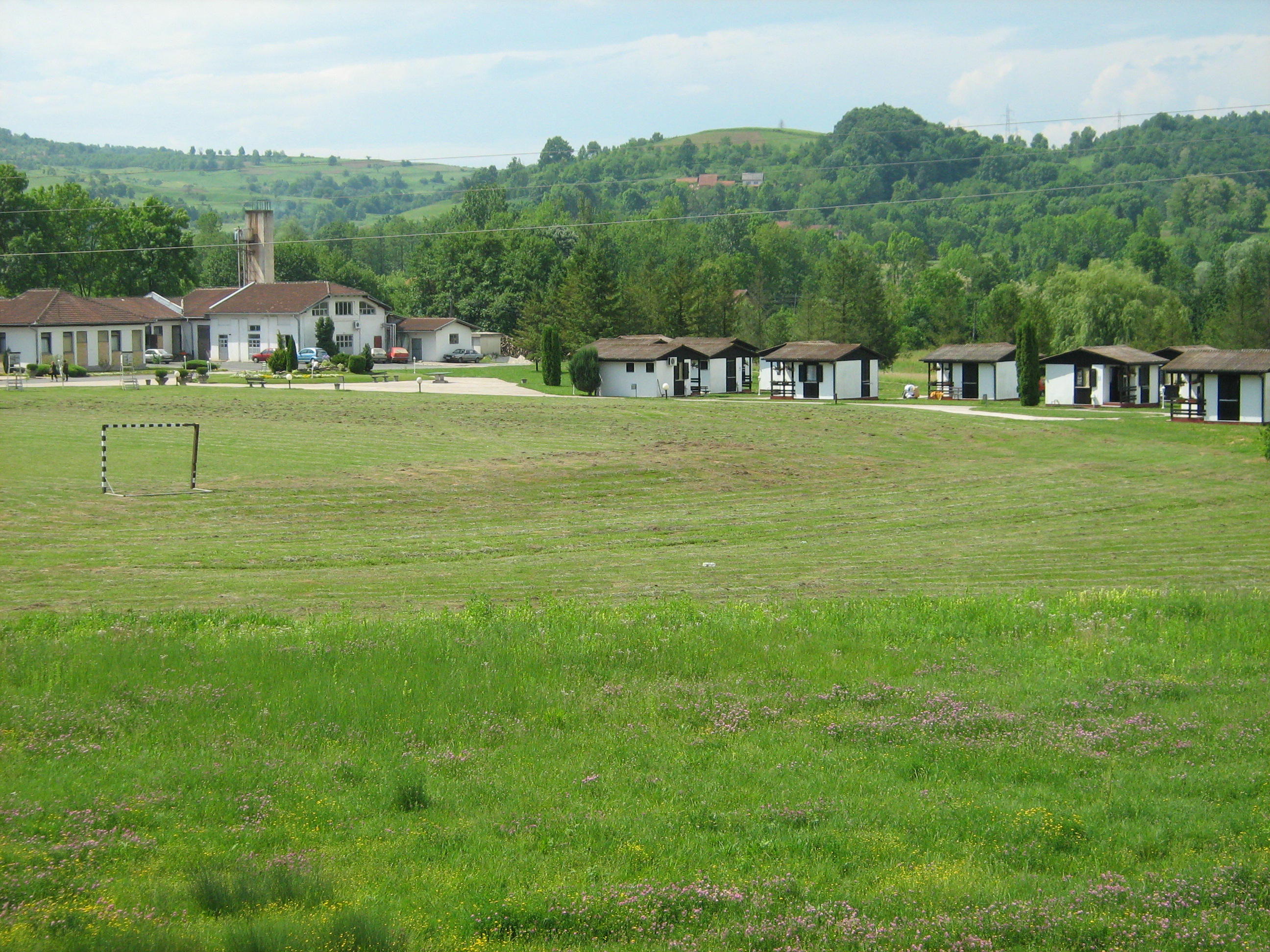
- Spa facilities in 2007

- Location within Bosnia and Herzegovina
- Coordinates: 45°06′22″N 16°44′24″E
- Country: Bosnia and Herzegovina
- Entity: Republika Srpska
- Municipality: Kozarska Dubica

Population (2013)
  - Total: 160
- Time zone: UTC+1 (CET)
  - Summer (DST): UTC+2 (CEST)

Mlječanica (Serbian Cyrillic: Мљечаница) is a spa village located in the municipality of Kozarska Dubica, Bosnia and Herzegovina. The Special Hospital "Mlječanica" is a center for physiatrics and rehabilitation. According to the 2013 census, the village had 160 residents.

== History ==
Mineral water of Mlječanica was first described by Austrian chemist Ernst Ludwig in 1888, but remained in use only by local residents. In the 1970s, more thorough hydro-geological studies were conducted, as well as a detailed physical and chemical analysis of the water. Construction of the spa began in the early 1980s, including a stationary with 105 beds, restaurant and accompanying facilities. The spa officially opened on 4 July 1987.

Patients come to Mlječanica for treatment of brain strokes and hemiplegia; rheumatic diseases (inflammation and degenerative, knuckle or out-knuckle rheumatism); gastrointestinal diseases; gynecological diseases, and post-traumatic and post-surgery conditions.

The natural mineral water is classified as a magnesium-calcium-sodium-sulfide water. The temperature at the source is 15 °C. The same water is used for treatment.

In 2021, the spa was declared "an institution of strategic importance" by the Government of Republika Srpska. Manager of the Special Hospital Darko Banjac announced investments of 32 million BAM (16 million Euro) in the upcoming period, and transformation of the hospital into a "respectable health and diagnostic centre". The planned expansions include a new semi-intensive care hospital department, with 50 beds; a resort complex including a 150-bed hotel, wellness centre and swimming pools; new bungalows; sports hall; football field and other sports pitches.
