= Donja Jutrogošta =

- Village
- Location within Bosnia and Herzegovina
- Coordinates: 45°06′N 16°40′E
- Country: Bosnia and Herzegovina
- Entity: Republika Srpska
- Municipality: Kozarska Dubica
- Time zone: UTC+1 (CET)
  - Summer (DST): UTC+2 (CEST)

Donja Jutrogošta (Serbian Cyrillic: Доња Јутрогошта) is a village in the municipality of Kozarska Dubica, Republika Srpska, Bosnia and Herzegovina.
