= Gornjoselci =

- Village
- Location within Bosnia and Herzegovina
- Coordinates: 45°05′47″N 16°51′26″E
- Country: Bosnia and Herzegovina
- Entity: Republika Srpska
- Municipality: Kozarska Dubica
- Time zone: UTC+1 (CET)
  - Summer (DST): UTC+2 (CEST)

Gornjoselci (Serbian Cyrillic: Горњоселци) is a village in the municipality of Kozarska Dubica, Republika Srpska, Bosnia and Herzegovina.
