= Vodička =

Vodička (feminine Vodičková) is a Czech and Slovak surname, which is a diminutive of the Czech word voda ("water"), and thus a topographic name for a person who lived by water. The name may refer to:

- Antonín Vodička (1907–1975), Czech football player
- Jan Vodička (1932–2014), Czech ice hockey player
- Jiří Vodička (born 1988), Czech violinist
- Joe Vodicka (1921–1995), American football player
- Kamila Vodičková (born 1972), Czech basketball player
- Ladislav Vodička (1931–1999), Czech musician
- Leo Marian Vodička (born 1950), Czech singer
- Radka Vodičková (born 1984), Czech athlete
- Ruth Vodicka (1921–1999), American sculptor

== Fictional characters ==
- Sapper Vodička, a friend of the Good Soldier Švejk
