= Ševarlije (Doboj) =

Ševarlije Шеварлије
- Village
- Location within Bosnia and Herzegovina
- Coordinates: 44°40′34″N 18°4′59″E
- Country: Bosnia and Herzegovina
- Entity: Republika Srpska
- Municipality: Doboj
- Time zone: UTC+1 (CET)
  - Summer (DST): UTC+2 (CEST)

Ševarlije (Cyrillic: Шеварлије) is a village in the municipality of Doboj, Republika Srpska, Bosnia and Herzegovina. This village is home to Bosnian footballer, Aidin Mahmutović of FK Teplice and formerly of Celik Zenica.
