= Komlenac =

- Village
- Location within Bosnia and Herzegovina
- Coordinates: 45°11′16″N 16°44′13″E
- Country: Bosnia and Herzegovina
- Entity: Republika Srpska
- Municipality: Kozarska Dubica
- Time zone: UTC+1 (CET)
  - Summer (DST): UTC+2 (CEST)

Komlenac (Serbian Cyrillic: Комленац) is a village in the municipality of Kozarska Dubica, Republika Srpska, Bosnia and Herzegovina.

== Notable people ==
- Milan Tepić (the last person awarded the Order of the People's Hero) was born in the village
