= Gunjevci =

- Village
- Location within Bosnia and Herzegovina
- Coordinates: 45°09′33″N 16°55′05″E
- Country: Bosnia and Herzegovina
- Entity: Republika Srpska
- Municipality: Kozarska Dubica
- Time zone: UTC+1 (CET)
  - Summer (DST): UTC+2 (CEST)

Gunjevci (Serbian Cyrillic: Гуњевци) is a village in the municipality of Kozarska Dubica, Republika Srpska, Bosnia and Herzegovina.
