= Božići, Montenegro =

Božići Божићи
- Village
- Location within Montenegro
- Coordinates: 42.726637°N 19.787271°E
- Country: Montenegro
- Municipality: Andrijevica

Population (2023)
  - Total: 157
- Time zone: UTC+1 (CET)
  - Summer (DST): UTC+2 (CEST)

Božići (Serbian Cyrillic: Божићи) is a village in the municipality of Andrijevica, Montenegro.

== Demographics ==
According to the 2011 census, it had a population of 157 people.

Ethnicity in 2011
Ethnicity	Number	Percentage
Serbs	117	62.9%
Montenegrins	61	32.8%
other/undeclared	8	3.8%
Total	186	100%
