= Mećava (surname) =

- Pronunciation: mětɕaʋa

Origin
- Language: Serbo-Croatian
- Meaning: snowstorm blizzard
- Region of origin: Banovina; Bosanska Krajina

Mećava (Serbian Cyrillic: Мећава, pronounced [mětɕaʋa]), is a Serbian surname and literally means snowstorm. It's mostly found in Bosnia and Herzegovina and Croatia.

The vast majority of bearers of the surname are Eastern Orthodox (Serbian Orthodox Church) and declare as ethnic Serbs, although there are some Catholics (Croats) with the surname. Most of the Orthodox maintain the tradition of slava (patron saint veneration) of Saint George (Đurđevdan).

It may refer to the following people:

- Mile Mećava (1915–1942), a Bosnian Serb farmer, Partisan and a hero from World War II.
- Petar Mećava (1914–1944), a Croatian Serb military officer and a hero from World War II.
