= Božići, Novi Travnik =

Božići
- Village
- Location within Bosnia and Herzegovina
- Coordinates: 44.1100307°N 17.6351218°E
- Country: Bosnia and Herzegovina
- Entity: Federation of Bosnia and Herzegovina
- Canton: Central Bosnia
- Municipality: Novi Travnik

Area
  - Total: 0.72 sq mi (1.86 km^{2})

Population (2013)
  - Total: 71
  - Density: 99/sq mi (38/km^{2})
- Time zone: UTC+1 (CET)
  - Summer (DST): UTC+2 (CEST)

Božići is a village in the municipality of Novi Travnik, Bosnia and Herzegovina.

== Demographics ==
According to the 2013 census, its population was 71.

Ethnicity in 2013
Ethnicity	Number	Percentage
Bosniaks	70	98.6%
other/undeclared	1	1.4%
Total	71	100%
