= Kadin Jelovac =

- Village
- Location within Bosnia and Herzegovina
- Coordinates: 45°07′31″N 16°52′06″E
- Country: Bosnia and Herzegovina
- Entity: Republika Srpska
- Municipality: Kozarska Dubica

Government
- Time zone: UTC+1 (CET)
  - Summer (DST): UTC+2 (CEST)

Kadin Jelovac (Serbian Cyrillic: Кадин Јеловац) is a village in the municipality of Kozarska Dubica, Republika Srpska, Bosnia and Herzegovina.
