= Knežica, Croatia =

Knežica
- Village
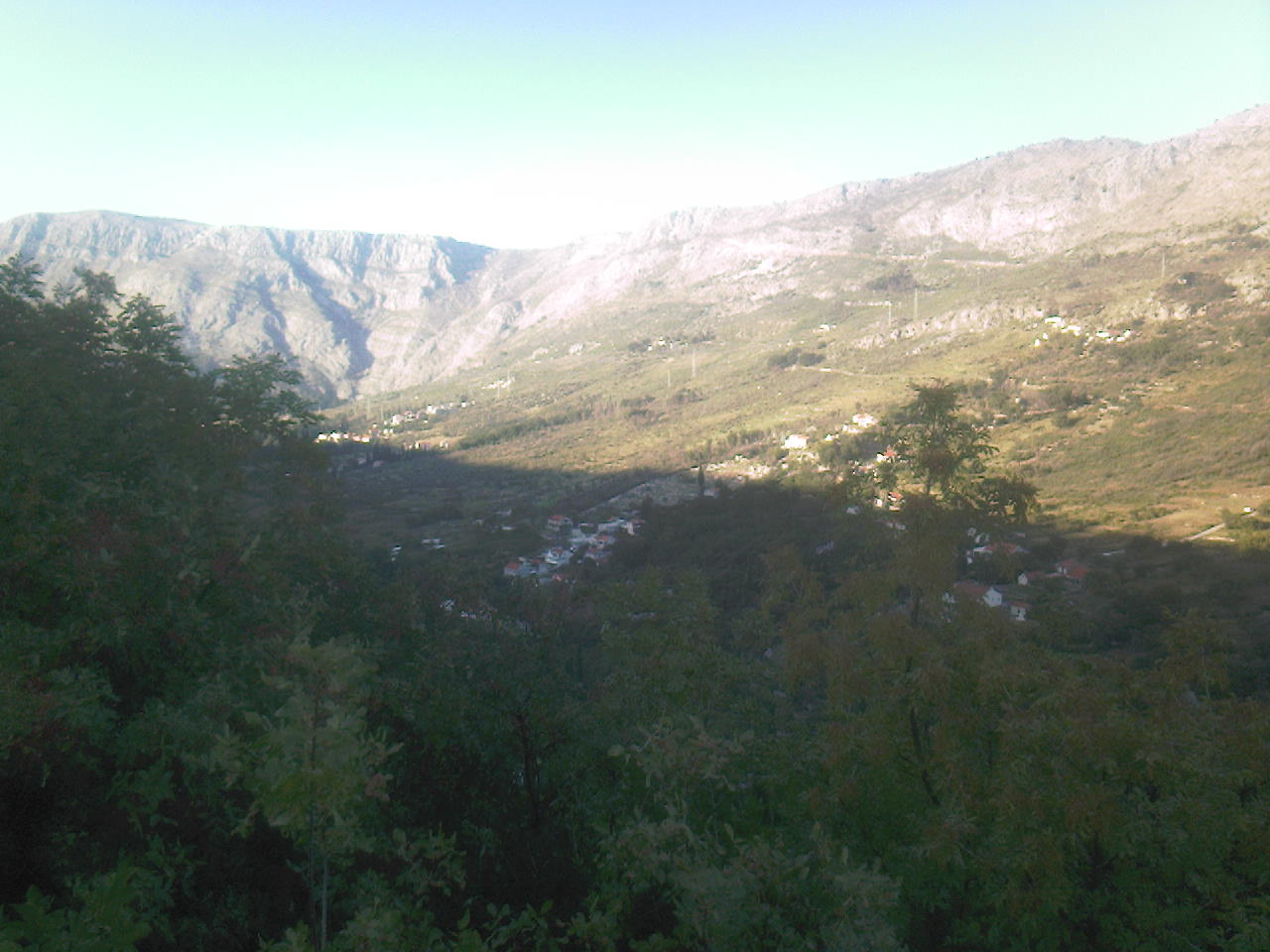

- Location within Croatia
- Coordinates: 42.6553924°N 18.131341°E
- Country: Croatia
- County: Dubrovnik-Neretva County
- Municipality: Dubrovnik

Area
  - Total: 0.73 sq mi (1.9 km^{2})

Population (2021)
  - Total: 148
  - Density: 200/sq mi (78/km^{2})
- Time zone: UTC+1 (CET)
  - Summer (DST): UTC+2 (CEST)

Knežica is a village in Croatia.

== Demographics ==
According to the 2021 census, its population was 148.
