= Donji Korićani =

- Village
- Location within Bosnia and Herzegovina
- Coordinates: 44.3695901°N 17.5202346°E
- Country: Bosnia and Herzegovina
- Entity: Republika Srpska; Federation of Bosnia and Herzegovina
- Region Canton: Banja Luka; Central Bosnia
- Municipality: Kneževo; Travnik

Area
  - Total: 7.93 sq mi (20.54 km^{2})

Population (2013)
  - Total: 99
  - Density: 12/sq mi (4.8/km^{2})
- Time zone: UTC+1 (CET)
  - Summer (DST): UTC+2 (CEST)

Donji Korićani is a village in the municipalities of Travnik and Kneževo, Bosnia and Herzegovina.

== Demographics ==
According to the 2013 census, its population was 99, all Serbs in the Travnik part and 84 of them in the Kneževo part.
