= Bogoljub Pejčić =

Serbian journalist (born 1936)

Bogoljub Pejčić (Serbian Cyrillic: Богољуб Пејчић; born 6 January 1936) is a Serbian retired journalist, author, and politician. He has served four terms in the Serbian parliament and was a minister in the transitional government established after the fall of Slobodan Milošević in 2000. A prominent figure in the Serbian Renewal Movement (SPO) for many years, he later joined the breakaway Serbian Democratic Renewal Movement (SDPO).

== Early life and career ==
Pejčić was born in Skoplje (now Skopje), in what was then the Vardar Banovina of the Kingdom of Yugoslavia. He holds a degree in political science. He wrote several articles for Borba in the early 1970s, and in 1975 he published a work entitled Iskušenje slobodnog vremena (English: The Temptations of Free Time).

In 1985, Pejčić wrote an article accusing Rexhep Qosja of falsifying the history of Kosovo and of ignoring historical persecutions of Kosovo Serbs by Kosovo Albanians. Pejčić subsequently researched historical Serb settlements in Albania, with a particular focus on the evidence provided by Serbian churches of the fourteenth and fifteenth centuries. In May 1989, he accused the People's Socialist Republic of Albania of attempting "to destroy every trace of Serbian existence, duration, culture, and history on its own soil (just like on the soil of the future, imagined 'Greater Albania'.)"

== Politician ==
Pejčić joined Vojislav Šešelj's Serbian Freedom Movement (SSP) in early 1990, prior to Šešelj's turn toward far-right politics. The SSP merged into Vuk Drašković's Serbian Renewal Movement on 14 March 1990, although profound differences soon developed between Drašković and Šešelj over the SPO's direction. Pejčić was a prominent supporter of Drašković and an opponent of Šešelj in this period, describing the latter as a "putschist" and leading a motion to expel him from the party.

Pejčić was the SPO's candidate for Zemun's second constituency seat in the 1990 Serbian parliamentary election. He was defeated in the second round of voting by Duško Matković of the Socialist Party of Serbia (SPS). Over the next decade, Serbian political life was dominated by the authoritarian rule of SPS president Slobodan Milošević and his allies.

By 1991, Pejčić was a SPO vice-president and the editor-in-chief of Srpska reč (which was strongly associated with the SPO, although Pejčić rejected the notion that it was the party's official journal). While the SPO originally promoted an ideology of Serbian nationalism, it later became associated with opposition to the Yugoslav Wars of the early 1990s. In June 1991, Pejčić said on Slovenian television, "in this crazy time and crazy war, on behalf of the SPO, I express my condolences to all Serbian, Slovenian, Croatian and all other mothers who have lost their sons." In December of the same year, with regard to the ongoing war in Croatia, he said, "We could not approve this war. [...] This war is in the service of preserving [Milošević's] government and nothing more."

In February 1992, Pejčić and fellow SPO vice-president Jovan Marjanović travelled to Australia, where they and members of the SPO's Australian international committee met with speaker of the House of Representatives Leo McLeay. Pejčić and Marjanović talked about the current situation in the former Yugoslavia, with a particular focus on the status of the Serb community in the Krajina. McLeay expressed his wish for the conflict to be resolved peacefully.

The SPO joined with other opposition parties to create the Democratic Movement of Serbia (DEPOS) opposition coalition in May 1992. At a DEPOS rally in Užice in August of that year, Pejčić said, "No party alone can defeat the communists in power in the upcoming elections, but together we can, and this year, God willing, we will defeat the communists." (By "the communists," he meant the governing Socialist Party.) Later in the year, he criticized Kosovo Albanian leader Ibrahim Rugova for boycotting the elections, saying that Rugova actually wanted Milošević to remain in power. Pejčić also said that if Milošević were defeated, the outside world would no longer accept Rugova's claims about Kosovo Albanians being endangered and Kosovo being Albanian land.

=== Parliamentarian ===
==== First term (1993–94) ====
Prior to the 1992 Serbian parliamentary election, Serbia adopted a system of proportional representation in which one-third of parliamentary mandates were assigned to candidates on successful electoral lists in numerical order and the remaining two-thirds to other candidates at the discretion of the sponsoring parties and coalitions. Pejčić appeared in the sixth position on the DEPOS list for the Belgrade division. The list won fifteen seats; while not automatically elected, he was assigned an "optional" mandate and took his seat when the assembly convened in January 1993. The Socialist Party won an overall plurality victory with 101 out of 250 seats and initially governed with informal support from Vojislav Šešelj's far-right Serbian Radical Party (SRS). DEPOS, with fifty seats, served in opposition. Pejčić was a member of the parliamentary defence and security committee.

Pejčić boycotted the assembly when Slobodan Milošević took the oath of office as Serbian president following his re-election in the 1992 Serbian presidential election. In a letter to Zoran Lilić, the president of the national assembly, Pejčić wrote, "Too many people have knelt demanding the resignation of Mr. Slobodan Milošević for me to be able to stand as a member of parliament when he takes the oath. In addition, Mr. Milošević is taking the oath for the fourth time, and after each one, it is getting harder and harder for the Serbian people. For these reasons, and not out of disrespect for the will of the majority of citizens and the personality of the president, I inform you that I will not be present at the part of the session when Mr. Slobodan Milošević takes the oath."

In late January 1993, Pejčić urged the Serbian parliament to hold an emergency debate on Operation Maslenica, in which Croatia sought to take territory held by forces of the Republic of Serbian Krajina (RSK). He said that if Croatia did not comply with the terms of the United Nations Security Council (which condemned the operation), Serbia should issue an ultimatum for Croatian forces to withdraw in three days; if Croatia failed to comply, Serbia should then use military force to defend the area's Serb population in accordance with Serbia's constitution. He added that he was against the use of any paramilitary forces in the conflict but would favour mobilization of the Serbian army. (Note: His intended meaning in this context was presumably the Yugoslav Army (VJ). The Republic of Serbia did not have its own military at the time.) Ultimately, the Croatian military action ended after ten days due to a counteroffensive from the Serbian Krajina military.

Pejčić was defeated in his bid for re-election as a SPO vice-president in March 1993.

SPO leader Vuk Drašković and his wife Danica were arrested, beaten, and sent to a high-security prison in June 1993 following opposition street protests in Belgrade. A number of SPO parliamentarians, including Pejčić, later went on a hunger strike calling for their release. The couple were ultimately released from prison following an international campaign.

In August 1993, Pejčić wrote an editorial piece in Srpska reč that was strongly critical of both Šešelj and Ratko Mladić in the context of the Bosnian War. He wrote, "If [NATO] missiles start falling on the mountains around Sarajevo, this will not mean, as General Mladić and the warlord Šešelj explain it, that the West wants to start a new war to the advantage of the Muslims. It will be in response to the heartless and arrogant behaviour of Serbian leaders quarrelling with the whole world, who in their irrational blindness cannot see the enormous suffering of, primarily, their own Serbian people."

The Socialist–Radical alliance broke down later in 1993, and in September of that year the Radicals brought a motion of non-confidence against the government. The SPO initially refused to support the motion; Pejčić justified this decision on the grounds that, if successful, the motion would lead to an even worse administration, in which the Milošević regime would likely appoint a Radical prime minister to cover up its own past performance in government. Subsequently, however, Pejčić announced that the SPO would vote to bring down the government if Zoran Sokolović did not resign as minister of internal affairs, citing Sokolović's responsibility for presiding over a breakdown of law and order and a concurrent rise of organized crime. Faced with the real possibility of defeat, Milošević dissolved parliament and called a new parliamentary election for December 1993.

==== Second term (1994–97) ====
Pejčić appeared in the lead position on the DEPOS list for the Leskovac division in the 1993 election and was automatically re-elected when the list won two mandates. The Socialists won an increased plurality victory with 123 seats, while DEPOS won forty-five. Subsequently, the SPS gained a parliamentary majority though an alliance with the small New Democracy (ND) party, which had hitherto been a part of DEPOS; the DEPOS coalition largely ceased to function after this time. Pejčić once again served on the defence and security committee and, due to an inter-party agreement on the distribution of parliamentary responsibilities, was chosen as its president. He also served as a member of the committee for relations between national communities, and he was elected as a member of the SPO presidency in January 1994.

In April 1994, Muslim National Council of Sandžak president Sulejman Ugljanin called for Serbia's Sandžak region to be annexed to Bosnia and Herzegovina. Pejčić described Ugljanin's statement as "very stupid," saying that it was not in anyone's interest to "start a new fire" in the region. He added that other leaders of Ugljanin's Party of Democratic Action of Sandžak (SDA S) had previously indicated their willingness to remain within Serbia "on condition that they were protected from police repression."

Shortly thereafter, Pejčić proposed that the security and defence committee discuss "problems in achieving cooperation between the committee and the Serbian ministry of internal affairs" and also review a report from the Humanitarian Law Center on "political repression in the Sandžak." The committee rejected Pejčić's proposal on the motion of Socialist parliamentarian Radmilo Bogdanović. Pejčić afterward expressed profound disappointment that the committee was unable to effectively scrutinize the internal affairs ministry, saying that it was impossible to communicate with minister Zoran Sokolović and that citizens would continue to be "beaten and mistreated" by elements of the Serbian police "without anyone being able to help them."

Pejčić once again moved a discussion of the Humanitarian Law Center's report on the Sandžak at a meeting of the defence and security committee in late May 1994, and the Socialist majority again voted against it. The following month, the committee voted to remove Pejčić as chair. (On the day that he was removed from office, the committee received a report from the Serbian police on weapons confiscation in the Sandžak that was seen as confirming some of Pejčić's charges. He had requested this report several times prior to his dismissal.)

In July 1994, Pejčić sent a letter to Serbian prime minister Mirko Marjanović once again requesting the removal of Zoran Sokolović as internal affairs minister, citing instances of police brutality against Serbian citizens under Sokolović's watch. The following month, Pejčić urged the defence and security committee to review a whistleblower's recent claims of widespread corruption within the internal affairs ministry and charged that the Socialists were seeking to "cover up the whole affair."

Pejčić sought election to the Belgrade city assembly in the 1996 Serbian local elections and was defeated in the second round of voting by Srđan Smiljković of the Yugoslav Left (JUL). Available online accounts do not specify which electoral division Pejčić contested.

==== Third term (1997–2001) and tenure in cabinet (2000–01) ====
Serbia's parliamentary constituencies were restructured prior to the 1997 Serbian parliamentary election. Pejčić led the SPO's list for the smaller, redistributed division of New Belgrade and was elected to a third term when the list won two seats. The Socialists contested the election in an alliance with New Democracy and the Yugoslav Left; their alliance won 110 out of 250 seats, and the Socialists and JUL later formed a coalition government with the Radicals. The SPO won forty-five seats and remained in opposition.

Pejčić was re-elected to the SPO presidency in June 1997.

In 2000, a group of Serbian opposition parties formed the Democratic Opposition of Serbia (DOS) to challenge Milošević's administration; the SPO was not part of the alliance. DOS candidate Vojislav Koštunica defeated Milošević in the 2000 Yugoslavian presidential election, and Milošević subsequently fell from power on 5 October 2000. The Serbian government also fell after Milošević's defeat, and on 24 October a transitional administration was formed comprising the Socialists, the DOS, and the SPO. The information ministry was overseen by a collective of three ministers, and Pejčić was chosen as the SPO's representative. Once in office, he urged that the previous law on public information, passed when Aleksandar Vučić was minister, be suspended. In November 2000, Pejčić was also appointed to a commission for Kosovo, the status of which had become disputed after the Kosovo War and the NATO bombing of Yugoslavia.

Pejčić was not a candidate in the 2000 Serbian parliamentary election, and his initial parliamentary tenure ended when the new assembly convened on 22 January 2001. The SPO was not part of the new government that took office after the election, and his ministerial term ended three days later.

=== Return to parliament and departure from the SPO (2004–07) ===
Serbia's election laws were reformed after the fall of Milošević, such that the entire country became a single "at-large" electoral division and all mandates were awarded to candidates on successful lists at the discretion of the sponsoring parties or coalitions, irrespective of numerical order. The SPO contested the 2003 Serbian parliamentary election in an alliance with New Serbia (NS), and Pejčić appeared in the fourteenth position on their combined list. The list won twenty-two seats, thirteen of which were assigned to the SPO and nine to New Serbia; Pejčić was not initially included in the SPO's parliamentary delegation, but he received a mandate on 16 March 2004 as the replacement for another party member. The SPO was part of Serbia's coalition government in this period, and Pejčić supported the administration. He once again served on the defence and security committee and was also a member of the committee for culture and information.

In December 2004, Pejčić urged the national assembly to change Serbia's Law on the Rights of Veterans, Disabled Veterans, and Members of Their Families to equalize the rights of Yugoslav Partisans and Chetniks. During a debate on the matter, he said it was a historical injustice that Draža Mihailović and the Ravna Gora Movement had been deemed to be traitors.

The SPO ended its parliamentary alliance with New Serbia in late March 2005. When it did so, nine SPO parliamentarians, including Pejčić, broke with the party and formed a new assembly group in partnership with New Serbia, which took the name "9 + 9". Pejčić later announced that the SPO dissidents would convene at Ravna Gora on 14 May 2005 to form a new party; in so doing, and notwithstanding his own prior support for Vuk Drašković, he accused the SPO leader of insincerity in his support for the Chetnik cause. The party founded on 14 May took the name of the Serbian Democratic Renewal Movement (SDPO).

The SDPO contested the 2007 Serbian parliamentary election as part of a coalition Democratic Party of Serbia (DSS)–New Serbia electoral list. Pejčić was included on the list in the 154th position. The coalition won forty-seven seats, two of which were assigned to SDPO candidates; Pejčić was not given a mandate for another term.

The SDPO was not successful as a party in the long run. Prior to the 2008 Serbian parliamentary election, Pejčić said that the party was undecided about fielding candidates in the contest. It ultimately chose not to do so. In January 2010, he told Večernje novosti that the party no longer existed. He retired from public life after this time.

== Electoral record ==
=== National Assembly of Serbia ===
1990 Serbian parliamentary election: Zemun II
Candidate	Party	First round		Second round	
Candidate	Party	Votes	%	Votes	%
Duško Matković	Socialist Party of Serbia		41.93		elected
Bogoljub Pejčić	Serbian Renewal Movement		16.99		defeated
Dr. Vladimir Andrejević	New Communist Movement of Yugoslavia		defeated		
Branislav Jelenković	Democratic Party		defeated		
Brankica Jovanović	Green Party		defeated		
Tomislav Kresović	New Democracy – Movement for Serbia		defeated		
Dr. Marija Obradović	Union of Reform Forces of Yugoslavia in Serbia		defeated		
Nebojša Ružičić	Workers' Party of Yugoslavia		defeated		
Miloš Todorović	Citizens' Group		defeated		
Milan Žuža	Serbian National Renewal		defeated		
Total					
Source: All candidates except Matković and Pejčić are listed alphabetically.
