= Kneževo, Bosnia and Herzegovina =

Kneževo Кнежево
- Town and municipality
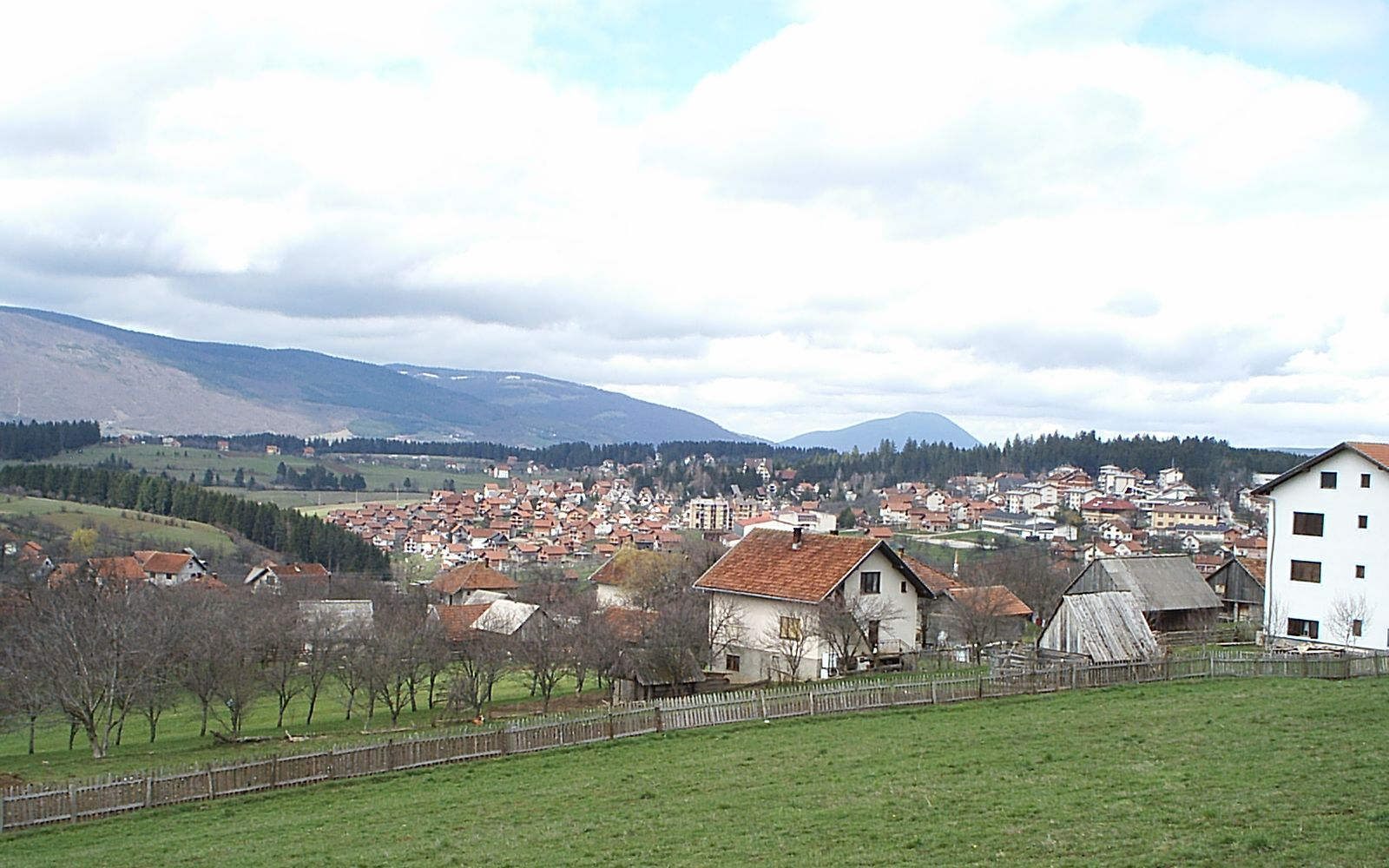
- Kneževo

- Coat of arms

- Location within Bosnia and Herzegovina

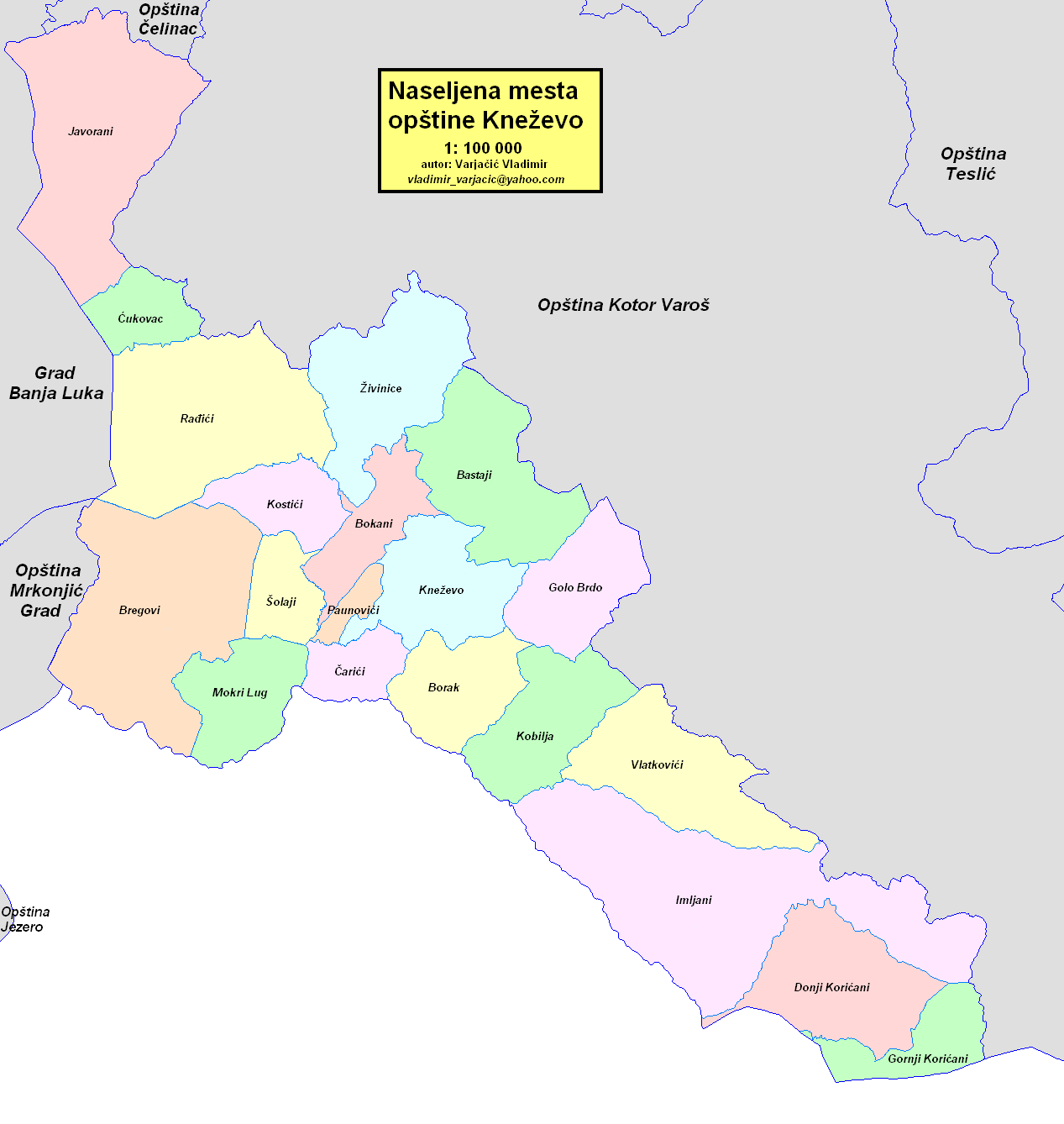
- Coordinates: 44°29′24″N 17°22′45″E
- Country: Bosnia and Herzegovina
- Entity: Republika Srpska

Government
  - Municipal mayor: Goran Borojević (SNSD)

Area
  - Total: 332.9 km^{2} (128.5 sq mi)

Population (2013 census)
  - Total: 9,793
  - Density: 29.42/km^{2} (76.19/sq mi)
- Time zone: UTC+1 (CET)
  - Summer (DST): UTC+2 (CEST)
- Area code: 51
- Website: Official Kneževo Municipality Website

Kneževo (Serbian Cyrillic: Кнежево), formerly Skender Vakuf (Serbian Cyrillic: Скендер Вакуф), is a town and municipality located in Republika Srpska, Bosnia and Herzegovina. As of 2013, it has a population of 9,793 inhabitants.

== Name ==
Up until the 1992–1995 Bosnian War, the town was known as Skender Vakuf. During the war, the town was renamed Kneževo by the Serb authorities as part of their ethnic cleansing policies. Accordingly, many media outlets in the region continue to refer to the area as Skender Vakuf-Kneževo.

== History ==
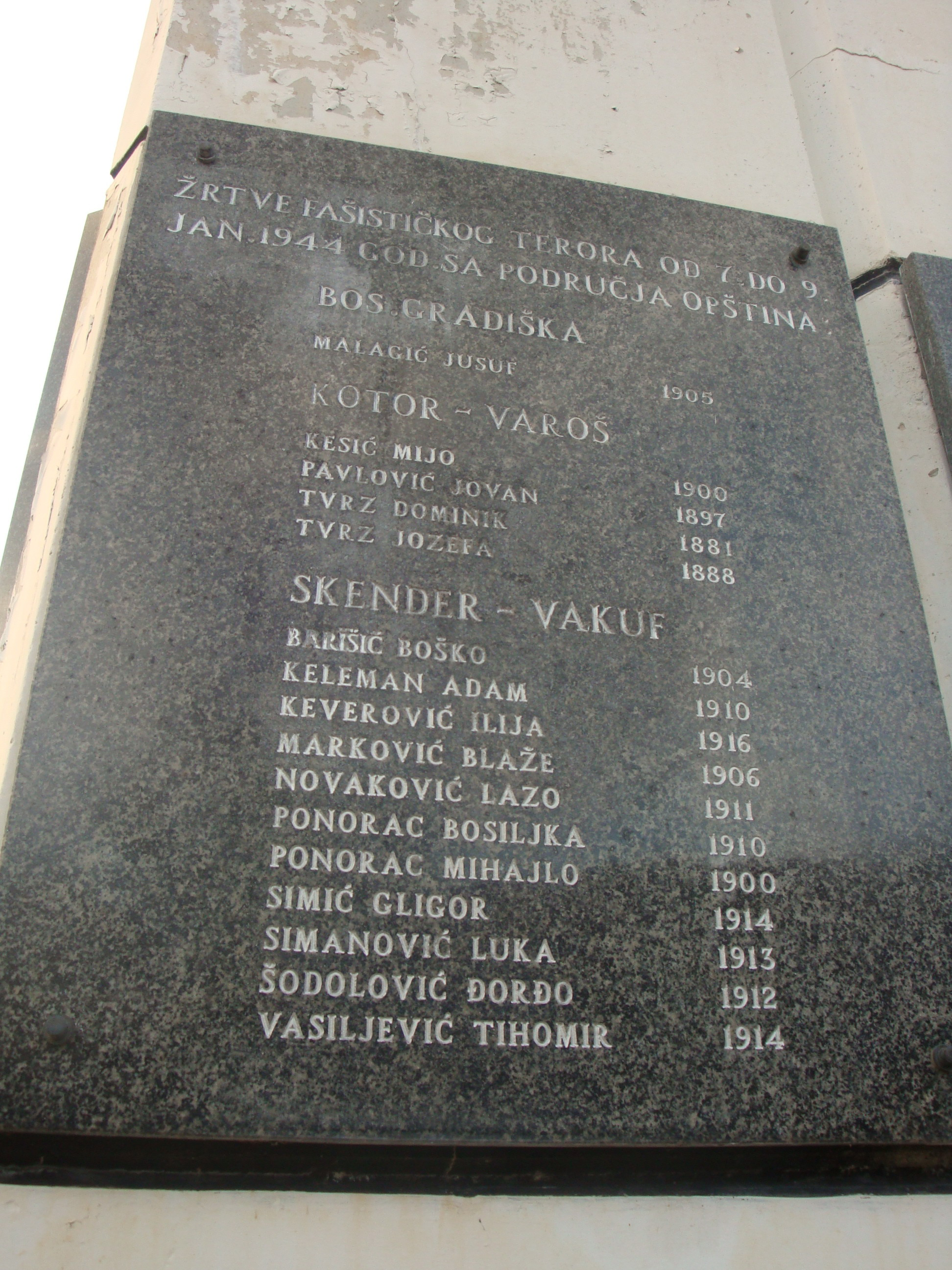
A plaque dedicated to local Serb victims of fascism

A Roman basilica has been found in Imljani and Javorani, and the remains of the Roman road from Servitium (Banja Luka) to Levsaba (Travnik) were also found in the vicinity. Tombstones of the Stećak type date back to the 14th and 15th centuries, when the area was part of the Kingdom of Bosnia. The town was founded during the reign of the Ottoman Empire. It was first mentioned in the records of a Muslim judge from Jajce in 1693, while there is no record of it in the census of the Bosnia Eyalet of 1604. Two generations of imams are mentioned in the records, which means it was most likely founded in the latter half of the 17th century. The architecture of the Old Mosque in Skender Vakuf also indicates it was built in the latter half of the 17th century. The charitable endowment (vakuf) that is reflected in the town's traditional name Skender Vakuf (after Ali-dedo Skender) contributed to its urbanization. The Old Mosque was significant and one of the first in the region. It was destroyed, along with the New Mosque, in 1992 during the Bosnian War. In the Korićani Cliffs massacre of 21 August 1992, some 200 Bosniak and Croat detainees were massacred in the municipality by the Bosnian Serb police and army forces from Prijedor. After the Bosnian War, a part of the municipality was split off to form the Dobretići municipality of the entity of the Federation of Bosnia and Herzegovina.

== Geography ==
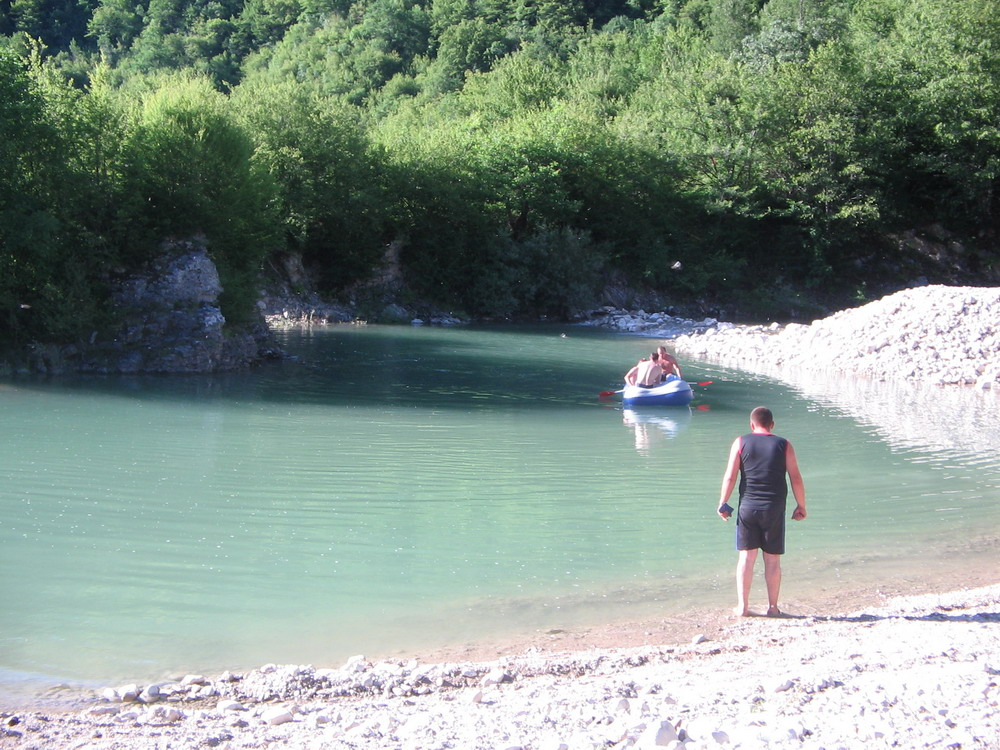
The Ugar river

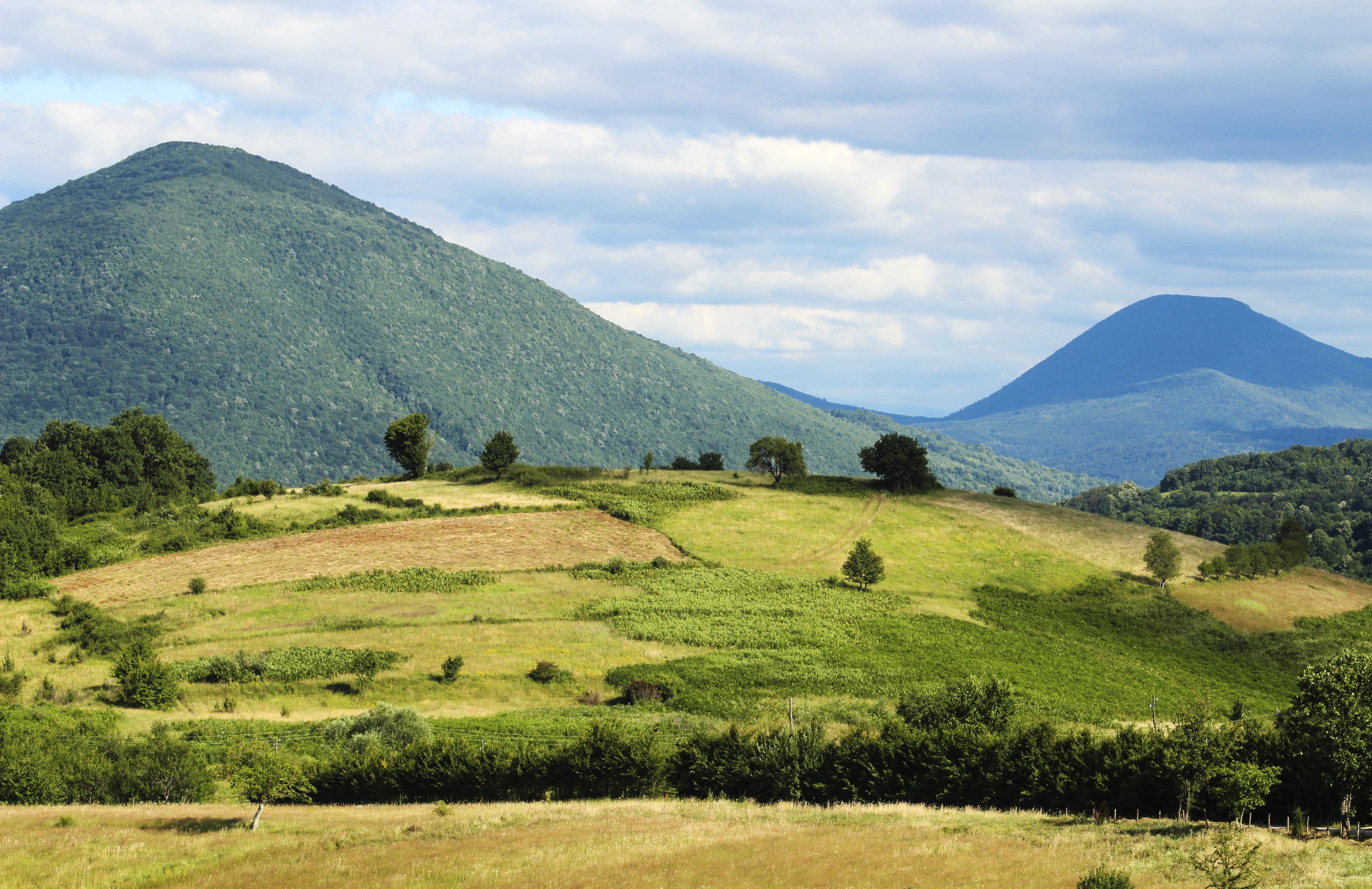
Landscape from Osmača

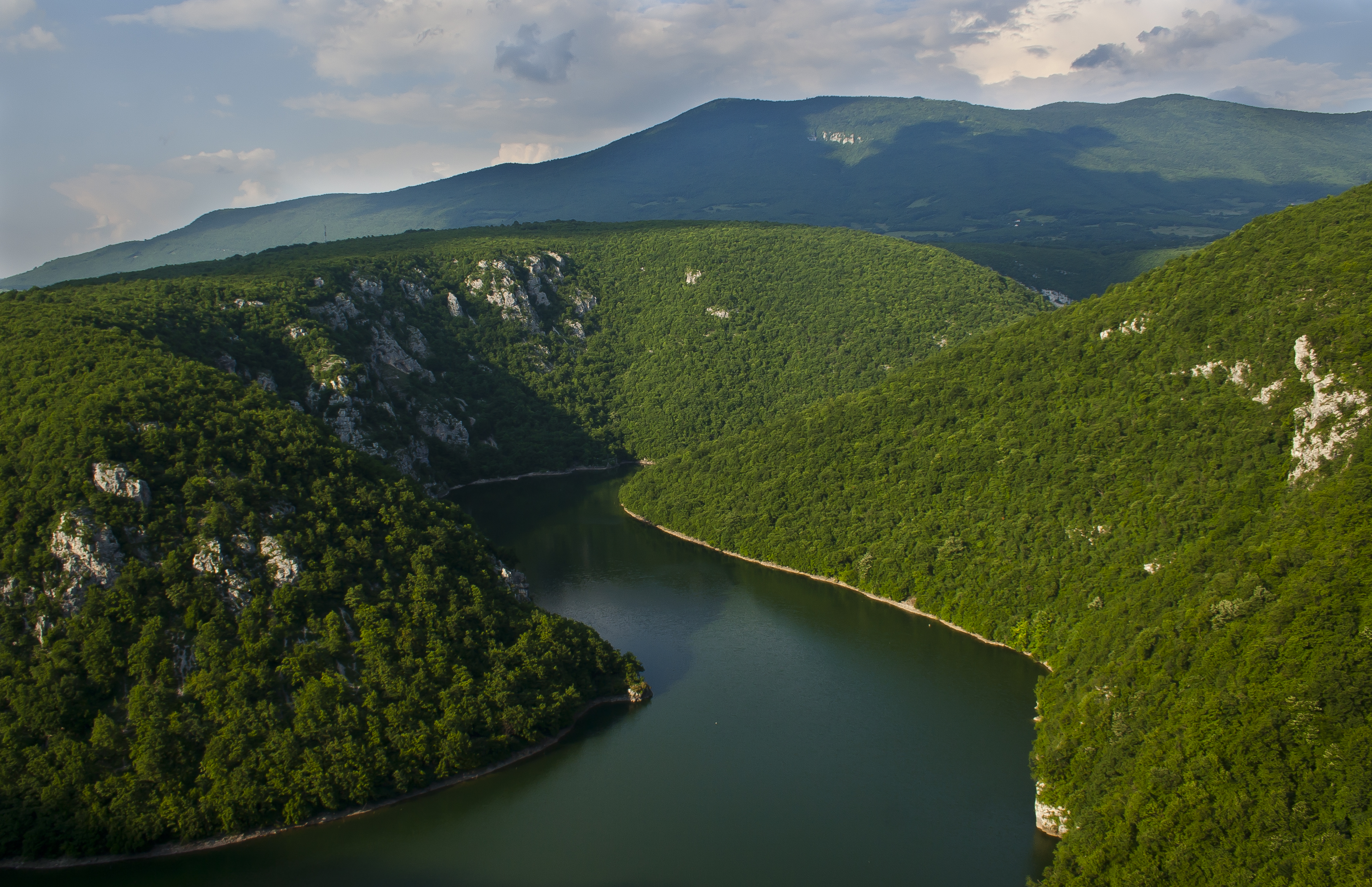
Lake Bočac and Čemernica

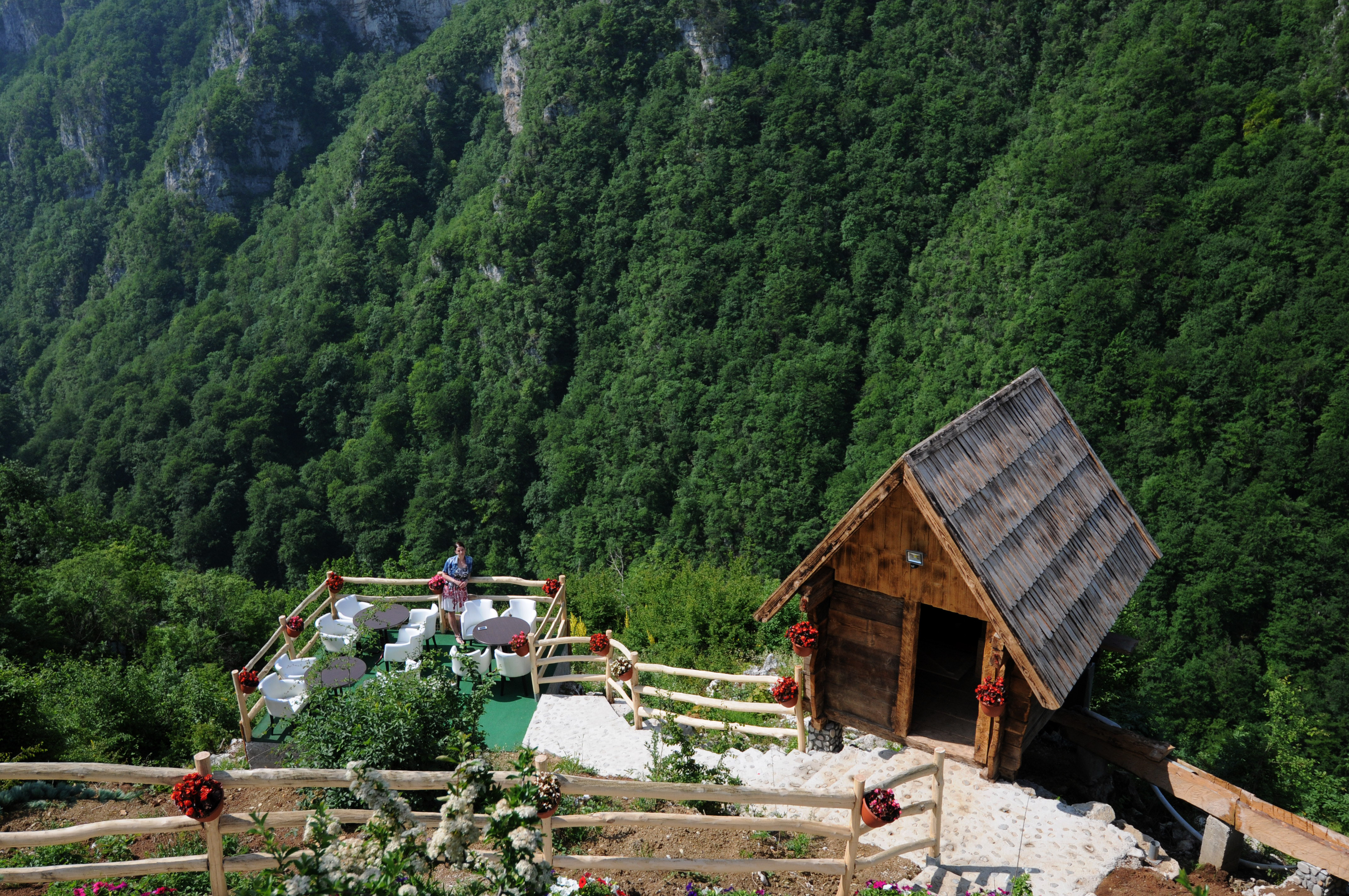
Café in the nature

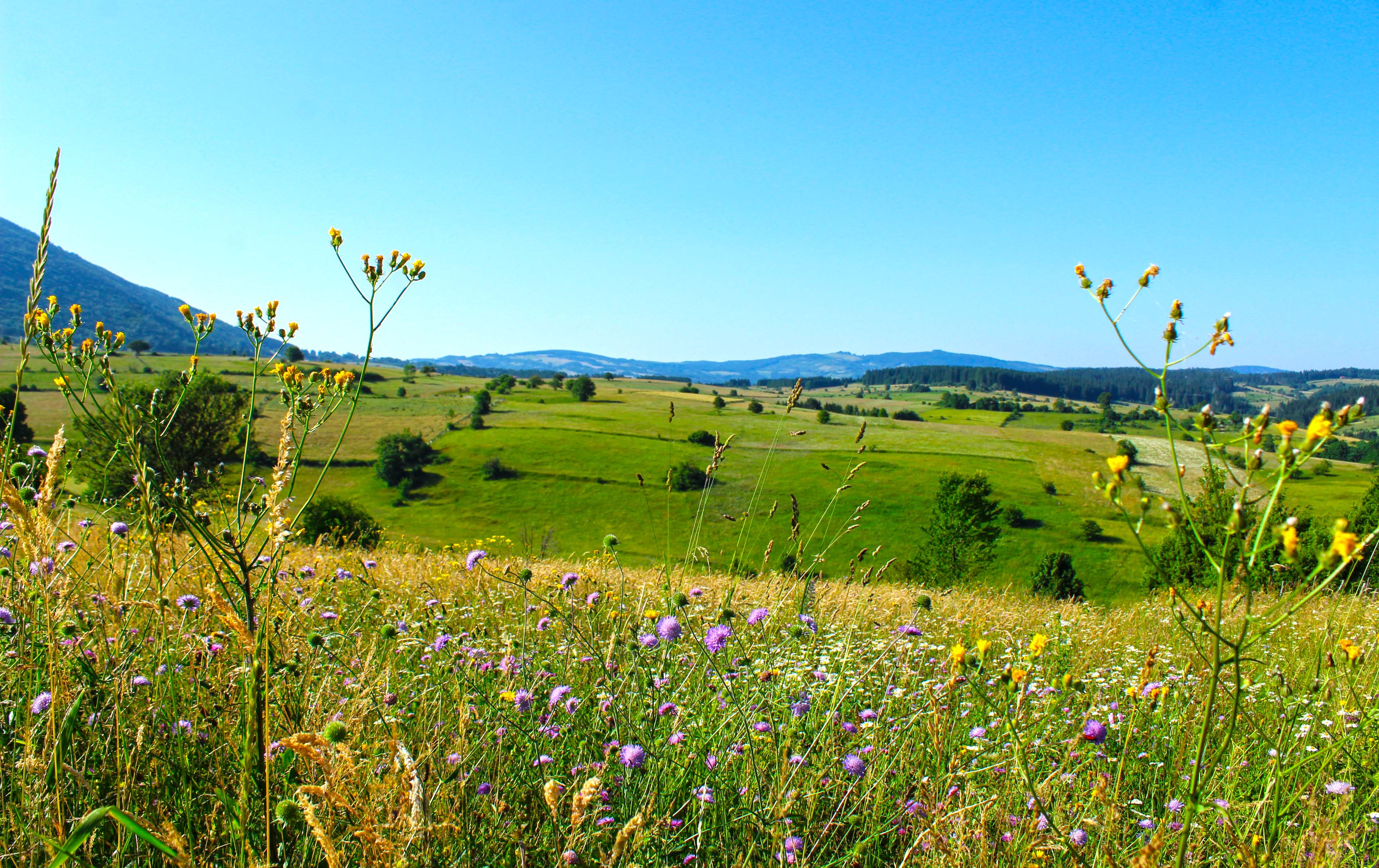
Nature park Čemernica

Kneževo is located between the rivers Ugar, Vrbas and Vrbanja and surrounded by the mountain chains of Čemernica and Ranča to the west, Vlašić to the south and Ježica to the northeast. The municipality has an official altitude of 864 metres (2,835 ft), but in reality it ranges from 600 to 1,493 metres (1,969 to 4,898 ft). Kneževo is 50 kilometres (31 mi) southeast of Banja Luka by the M56 motorway.

Neighbouring municipalities are Čelinac (far north), Kotor Varoš (east), Travnik, Dobretići, Jajce (south), Mrkonjić Grad (west) and the city of Banja Luka (northwest). The southern border is defined by the border of the Republika Srpska with the Federation of Bosnia and Herzegovina, the country's other entity. The mountainous region in the south is forested and inpenetrable; its limestone mountains reach a height of 1,493 metres (4,898 ft).

== Settlements ==
Aside from the town of Kneževo, the municipality includes the following settlements:

- Bastaji
- Bekići
- Bokani
- Borak
- Bregovi
- Vlatkovići
- Golo Brdo
- Gornji Korićani
- Doline
- Donji Korićani
- Živinice
- Imljani

Imamovići

- Javorani
- Kobilja
- Korićani
- Kostići

Mušanovići

- Milovići
- Mokri Lug
- Pavlovići
- Paunovići
- Petrovo Polje
- Ravni Sto
- Rađići
- Ćeleši
- Ćukovac
- Čarići
- Šolaji

== Demographics ==
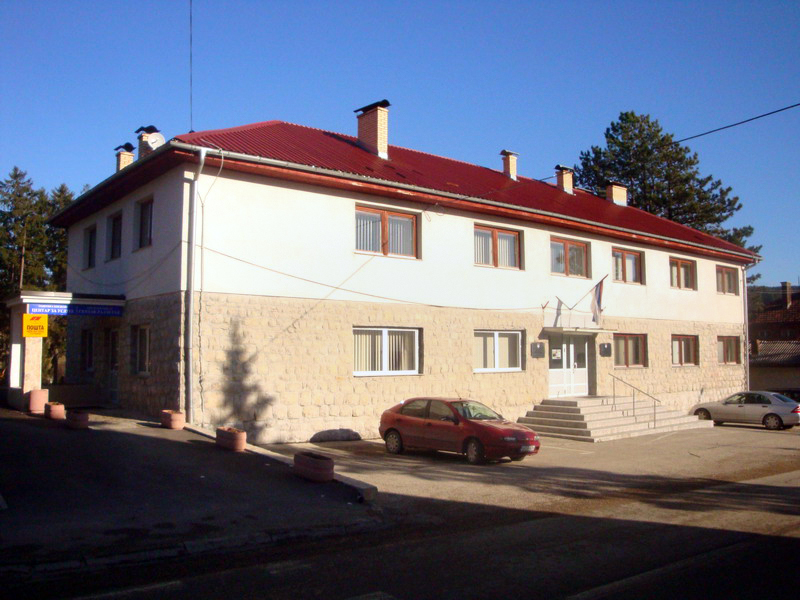
Municipality assembly building

=== Population ===
Population of settlements – Kneževo municipality
	Settlement	1961.	1971.	1981.	1991.	2013.
	Total	9,190	21,219	22,948	19,418	9,793
1	Bokani				466	310
2	Imljani				1,565	823
3	Javorani				1,289	759
4	Kneževo	992	1,688	2,910	3,759	3,958
5	Kostići				517	342
6	Rađići				1,405	864
7	Šolaji				586	435
8	Vlatkovići				730	302
9	Živinice				1,223	607

=== Ethnic composition ===
Ethnic composition – Kneževo town
	2013.	1991.	1981.	1971.
Total	3,958 (100,0%)	3,759 (100,0%)	2,910 (100,0%)	1,688 (100,0%)
Serbs		2,484 (66,08%)	1,491 (51,24%)	723 (42,83%)
Bosniaks		1,063 (28,28%)	1,118 (38,42%)	923 (54,68%)
Yugoslavs		111 (2,953%)	205 (7,045%)	5 (0,296%)
Others		59 (1,570%)	7 (0,241%)	4 (0,237%)
Croats		42 (1,117%)	45 (1,546%)	17 (1,007%)
Montenegrins			28 (0,962%)	10 (0,592%)
Albanians			14 (0,481%)	6 (0,355%)
Macedonians			1 (0,034%)	
Hungarians			1 (0,034%)	

Ethnic composition – Kneževo municipality
	2013.	1991.	1981.	1971.
Total	9,793 (100,0%)	19,418 (100,0%)	22,948 (100,0%)	21,419 (100,0%)
Serbs	9,288 (94,84%)	13,263 (68,30%)	15,953 (69,52%)	15,926 (74,35%)
Bosniaks	429 (4,381%)	1,071 (5,516%)	1,141 (4,972%)	947 (4,421%)
Others	45 (0,460%)	145 (0,747%)	64 (0,279%)	78 (0,364%)
Croats	31 (0,317%)	4,770 (24,56%)	5,395 (23,51%)	4,431 (20,69%)
Yugoslavs		169 (0,870%)	322 (1,403%)	9 (0,042%)
Montenegrins			53 (0,231%)	21 (0,098%)
Albanians			15 (0,065%)	6 (0,028%)
Slovenes			2 (0,009%)	1 (0,005%)
Hungarians			2 (0,009%)	
Macedonians			1 (0,004%)	

After the war, the majority of the old Skender Vakuf municipality became part of the new Kneževo municipality of the Republika Srpska entity. Four Croatian pre-war settlements became part of the new Dobretići municipality of the Federation of Bosnia and Herzegovina entity.

== Culture ==
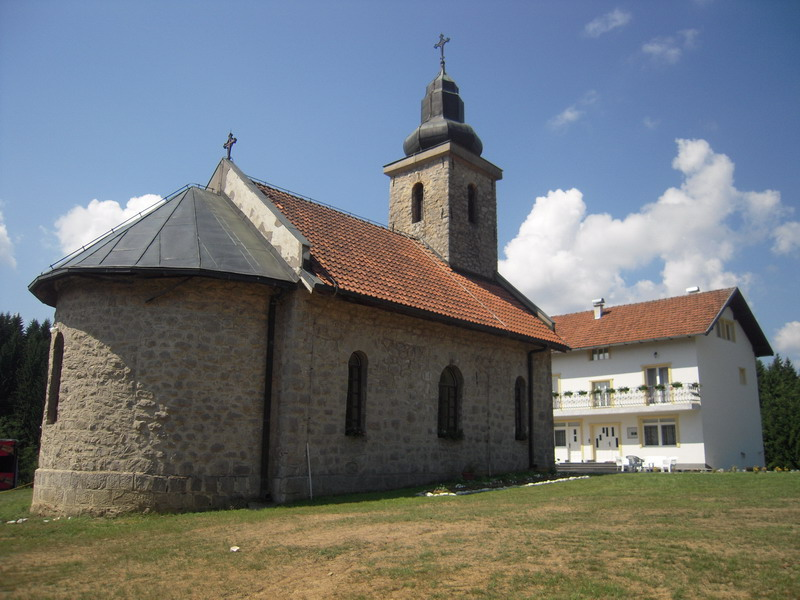
Church in Živinice

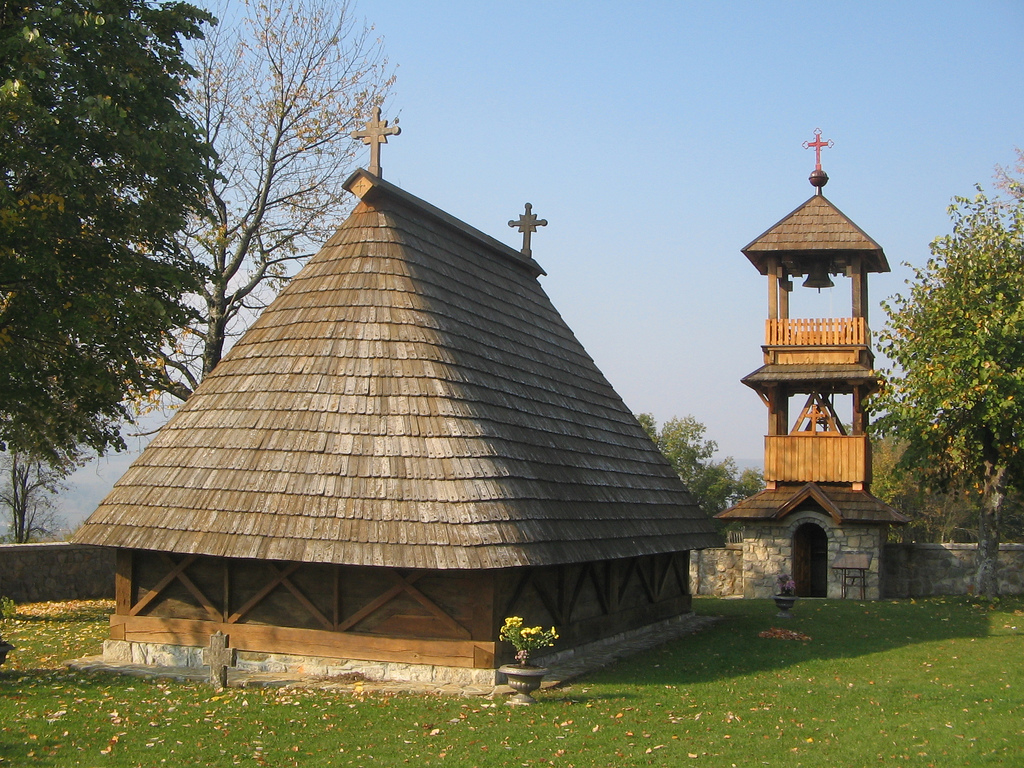
Wooden church in Javorani

The municipality houses several cultural monuments, such as the Old Church of St. Nicholas from 1757, the 18th-century Church of Prophet Elijah.

In Imljani there is a monument dedicated to the 43 fallen soldiers of the Army of Republika Srpska who fell on the Vlašić battlefield on 20 March 1995.

== Politics ==
The mayor of Knezevo is Bore Škeljić, of the Serb Democratic Party (SDS).

== Notable people ==
- Radojka Lakić, National Hero of Yugoslavia
- Luka Radetić, National Hero of Yugoslavia
- Dujko Komljenović, National Hero of Yugoslavia
- Lazar Tešanović, Chetnik officer, born in Javorani
- Željko Raljić, journalist
- Momir Ćelić, professor
- Tihomir Radetić, film director
- Radenko Mijatović, president of Football Association of Slovenia

== Annotations ==
According to the 1991 census, the municipality consisted of: Bastaji, Bokani, Borak, Bregovi, Brnjići, Bunar, Čarići, Ćukovac, Davidovići, Dobratići, Donji Orašac, Golo Brdo, Gornji Orašac, Imljani, Javorani, Kobilja, Kostići, Kričići - Jejići, Melina, Mijatovići, Milaševci, Mokri Lug, Paunovići, Pavlovići, Prisika, Rađići, Skender Vakuf, Slipčevići, Šolaji, Vitovlje Malo, Vlatkovići, Vukovići, Zapeće, Zasavica, Zubovići and Živinice.

In 1995, the municipality included Bastaji, Bokani, Borak, Bregovi, Čarići, Ćukovac, Golo Brdo, Imljani, Javorani, Kobilja, Kostići, Malići, Mokri Lug, Paunovići, Rađići, Kneževo, Šolaji, Vlatkovići and Živinice; the southwestern settlements of Davidovići, Dobretići, Kričići and Melina became part of the municipality of Dobretići in the Federation of Bosnia and Herzegovina.
