= Dobrosav Radović =

Serbian politician

Dobrosav Radović (Serbian Cyrillic: Добросав Радовић; born 7 February 1953) is a Serbian former politician. He was the mayor of Leposavić in the 1980s and served in the Serbian parliament from 1993 to 2001. At one time a high-ranking member of the League of Communists of Kosovo (SKK), he joined the Socialist Party of Serbia (SPS) on its formation in 1990.

== Early life and private career ==
Radović was born in the village in Crveni in Leposavić, in what was then the People's Republic of Serbia in the Federal People's Republic of Yugoslavia. In 1959, Leposavić was annexed to the Autonomous Region of Kosovo and Metohija.

In private life, Radović worked as a high school teacher in Leposavić.

== Politician ==
=== League of Communists of Kosovo ===
Radović was elected as secretary of the provincial conference of the Youth Union of Kosovo in March 1981 and was active with the province's Socialist Alliance of Working People (SSRN) in the same period. He became mayor of Leposavić after the 1982 Serbian local elections and later served as president of Leposavić's municipal committee of the League of Communists.

He was a delegate to the provincial committee of the League of Communists in the late 1980s and became known for his criticisms of certain party leaders. He welcomed the resignations of Azem Vllasi and Kaqusha Jashari in November 1989 (part of the anti-bureaucratic revolution), but also called for an investigation into what he described as the failures of their leadership. Radović ran for a position on provincial committee's presidency in January 1989 and was not, at the time, successful. He was later elected to the presidency in a by-election on 12 May 1989.

In September 1989, Radović delivered a speech describing Albanian nationalists and separatists as posing the greatest danger to the political situation in Kosovo, saying that calls for armed rebellion were becoming increasingly prevalent.

Radović was re-elected to the provincial committee of the League of Communists at its November 1989 conference. He intended to run for secretary of the party presidency, but he withdrew his candidacy prior to the vote and was instead re-elected to the presidency as an at-large member. During this period, he attended a number of public meetings organized by Kosovo's Serb and Montenegrin communities.

In January 1990, Radović was one of Kosovo's delegates to the ill-fated 14th Congress of the League of Communists of Yugoslavia. In a speech to the congress, he criticized "disrespect and resistance to [the party's] adopted positions" in some parts of the country, most notably in Slovenia and Croatia, and said that Kosovo was feeling the effects of the party's disunity "most drastically." He later got into a verbal exchange with a delegate from Slovenia, who criticized the absence of plans for a general election in Kosovo. The congress ended in failure after the Slovenian delegates walked out; in April 1990, Radović said that further negotiations with the Slovenian leadership would be pointless, as their program differed "drastically [...] from the basic principles and commitments" of the federal party. The failure of the 14th Congress ultimately led to the collapse of the League of Communists and hastened the breakup of Yugoslavia.

=== Socialist Party of Serbia ===
Serbia transitioned from a one-party socialist state to a (nominally) multi-party democracy in 1990. In July of that year, the League of Communists of Serbia (SKS) merged with Serbia's Socialist Alliance of Working People to create the Socialist Party of Serbia, which dominated Serbian politics over the next decade under Slobodan Milošević's authoritarian leadership. Radović became a member of the new party and served on its provincial executive board for Kosovo. He oversaw the party's campaign in Kosovo for the 1990 Serbian parliamentary election; due in large part to a boycott by members of the majority Albanian community, the Socialists won thirty of the province's thirty-four seats.

Serbia adopted a system of proportional representation for its 1992 parliamentary election, and Radović appeared in the fourth position on the Socialist Party's electoral list for the Leskovac division. He was elected when the list won fifteen mandatess and took his seat when the assembly met in January 1993. (From 1992 to 2000, Serbia's electoral law stipulated that one-third of parliamentary mandates would be assigned to candidates from successful lists in numerical order, while the remaining two-thirds would be distributed amongst other candidates at the discretion of the sponsoring parties. Radović was automatically elected by virtue of his list position.) In the assembly, he served on the committee for Kosovo and Metohija. The Socialists won a plurality victory overall in the 1992 election and initially governed with informal support from the far-right Serbian Radical Party (SRS).

Radović criticized political corruption in Kosovo in an April 1993 assembly speech, saying that two kinds of thieves stood out in the province: those who stole to harm the ruling party and those who stole thanks to the ruling party.

The Socialist–Radical alliance fell apart later in 1993, a new Serbian parliamentary election was called for December of that year, and Radović appeared in the tenth position on the Socialist Party's list for Leskovac. The list won a landslide victory in the division with twenty-one out of twenty-four seats; Radović was not automatically re-elected but was assigned a new mandate all the same. The Socialists won an increased plurality victory overall with 123 out of 250 seats and gained a parliamentary majority through an alliance with the small New Democracy (ND) party. In this term, Radović served on the defence and security committee and the committee on petitions and appeals.

The defence and security committee was initially chaired by Bogoljub Pejčić, a member of the opposition Serbian Renewal Movement (SPO). Radović called for Pejčić to be removed from office in May 1994, in the aftermath of Pejčić's unsuccessful attempts to have the committee accept a report from the Humanitarian Law Center on police repression in the Sandžak. Radović argued that Pejčić was "working poorly, abusing the function of chairman, and turning the committee into a training ground for political discussions." The Socialist majority on the committee succeeding in removing Pejčić as chair the following month.

In April 1995, Radović credited the government for taming hyperinflation and ensuring that stores were once again filled with goods. During this term, he was appointed by the Serbian government as president of an interim municipal council governing the municipality of Glogovac in Kosovo, where the Albanian boycott had prevented the election of a viable local assembly.

The Socialist Party contested the 1997 Serbian parliamentary election in a coalition with the Yugoslav Left (JUL) and New Democracy. Radović led the coalition's list in the smaller, redistributed division of Kosovska Mitrovica and was re-elected when the list won five out of seven seats. The Socialist Party's alliance won 110 seats overall, and the SPS and JUL subsequently formed a new coalition government with the Radical Party. During this period, Radović became president of the Socialist Party's district committee for Kosovska Mitrovica.

In September 1998, in the period of the Kosovo War, Radović said that "terrorists" were "ruthlessly attacking and killing members of the ministry of internal affairs" in the Drenica and Čičavica areas, as well as preventing other Albanian citizens from returning to their villages and "using them as human shields." He added that the militants were "inviting foreign intervention, because in this they see the only chance to achieve their goals and the goals of their foreign mentors." In May 1999, during the NATO bombing of Yugoslavia, Radović was re-appointed to the Socialist Party's provincial executive for Kosovo.

Serbia lost control over most of Kosovo at the conclusion of the Kosovo War and the NATO bombing campaign, and much of the Serb population fled the province; this notwithstanding, Serbia retained de facto authority over Leposavić and other municipalities in the north. In February 2000, Radović called on United Nations Interim Administration Mission in Kosovo (UNMIK) leader Bernard Kouchner and other international forces to "confirm the sincerity of their commitment to a multi-ethnic Kosovo" by providing for the return of Serbs and the restoration of their property throughout the province. He rejected the suggestion that Kosovo could be divided, describing this as a plan for the ghettoization of the Serb community. The following month, he said that discussions concerning new elections and a census in Kosovo would be illegitimate without the return of exiled communities and the full participation of all relevant state bodies in Serbia and the Federal Republic of Yugoslavia.

Slobodan Milošević fell from power on 5 October 2000, and the Socialists ceased to be the dominant party in Serbia. Radović was not a candidate in the 2000 Serbian parliamentary election, and his term ended when the new assembly convened in January 2001.

Radović became president of the Socialist Party's provincial committee for Kosovo in 2001. In July 2001, he said that it would be a "suicidal act" for Serbs to participate in the 2001 Kosovan parliamentary election, as this would provide legitimacy to plans to sever the province from Serbia. Notwithstanding his comments, many Kosovo Serbs did take part in the election, with most supporting the Return Coalition.

Radović continued to serve as president of the Socialist Party's provincial board for Kosovo until 2006. He appears to have withdrawn from political life after this time.
