= Bastaji, Bosnia and Herzegovina =

Coordinates: 44°30′50″N 17°24′14″E

Bastaji Бастаји
- Village
- Interactive map of Bastaji
- Country: Bosnia
- Entity: Republika Srpska
- Time zone: UTC+1 (CET)
  - Summer (DST): UTC+2 (CEST)

Bastaji (Cyrillic: Бастаји), is a village in Kneževo, Bosnia and Herzegovina.

== Population ==
=== Ethnic composition, 1991 census ===
Ethnic composition of Skender Vakuf municipality, by settlements, 1991. census
settlement	total	Serbs	Croats	Muslims	Yugoslavs	others
Bastaji	672	671	0	0	0	1
