= Šolaji =

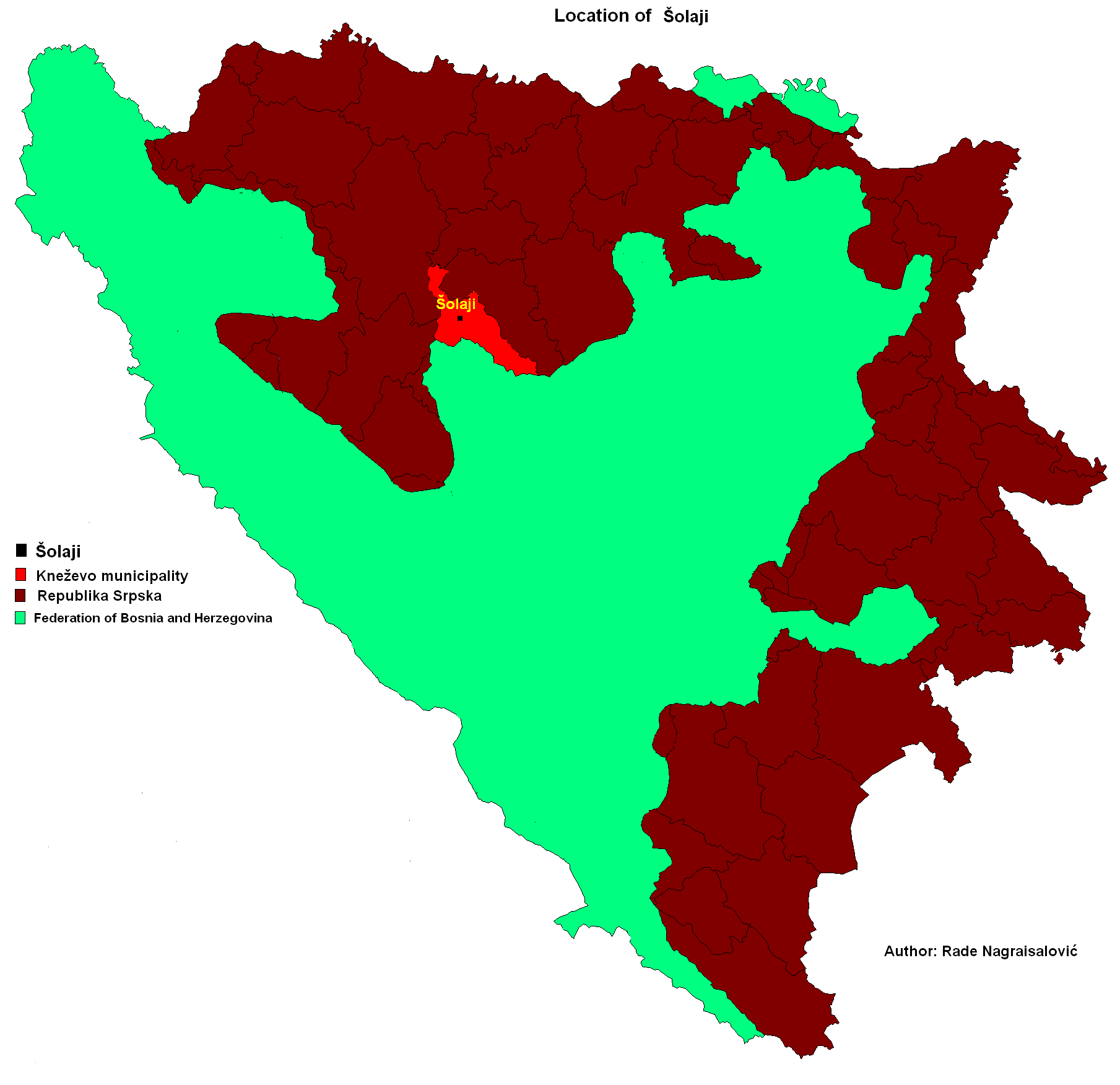
- Location of Šolaji in Bosnia and Herzegovina
- Coordinates: 44°49′N 17°32′E
- Country: Bosnia and Herzegovina
- Division: Republika Srpska
- Municipality: Kneževo

Population (1991)
  - Total: 586
- Time zone: UTC+2 (EET)
  - Summer (DST): UTC+3 (EEST)
- Area code: (+387) 51

Šolaji (Cyrillic: Шолаји), is a village in Kneževo municipality, Republika Srpska, Bosnia and Herzegovina.

== Population ==
=== Ethnic composition, 1991 census ===
Ethnic composition of Skender Vakuf municipality, by settlements, 1991. census
| settlement | total | Serbs | Croats | Muslims | Yugoslavs | others |
|---|---|---|---|---|---|---|
| Šolaji | 586 | 585 | 1 | 0 | 0 | 0 |
