= Bokani =

Bokani Бокани
- Village
- Location in Bosnia and Herzegovina
- Coordinates: 44.515°N 17.360°E
- Country: Bosnia
- Entity: Republika Srpska

Population (1991)
  - Total: 466
- Time zone: UTC+1 (CET)
  - Summer (DST): UTC+2 (CEST)

Bokani (Cyrillic: Бокани), is a village in Kneževo, Bosnia and Herzegovina.

== Population ==
=== Ethnic composition, 1991 census ===
Ethnic composition of Skender Vakuf municipality, by settlements, 1991. census
settlement	total	Serbs	Croats	Muslims	Yugoslavs	others
Bokani	466	460	0	0	6	0
