= Javorani, Kneževo =

Javorani
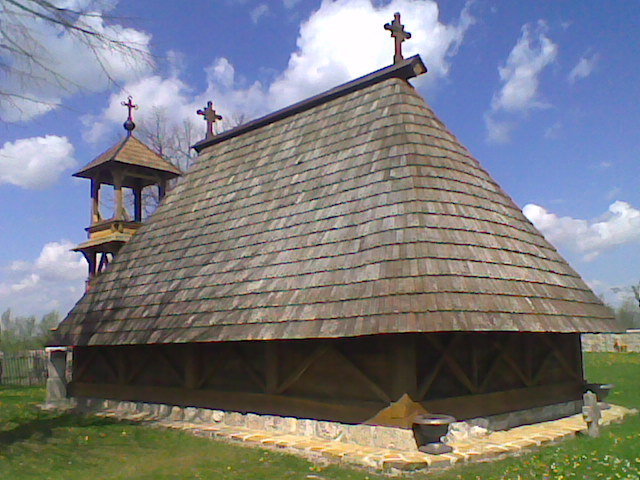
- Old St. Nicholas Church in Javorani.

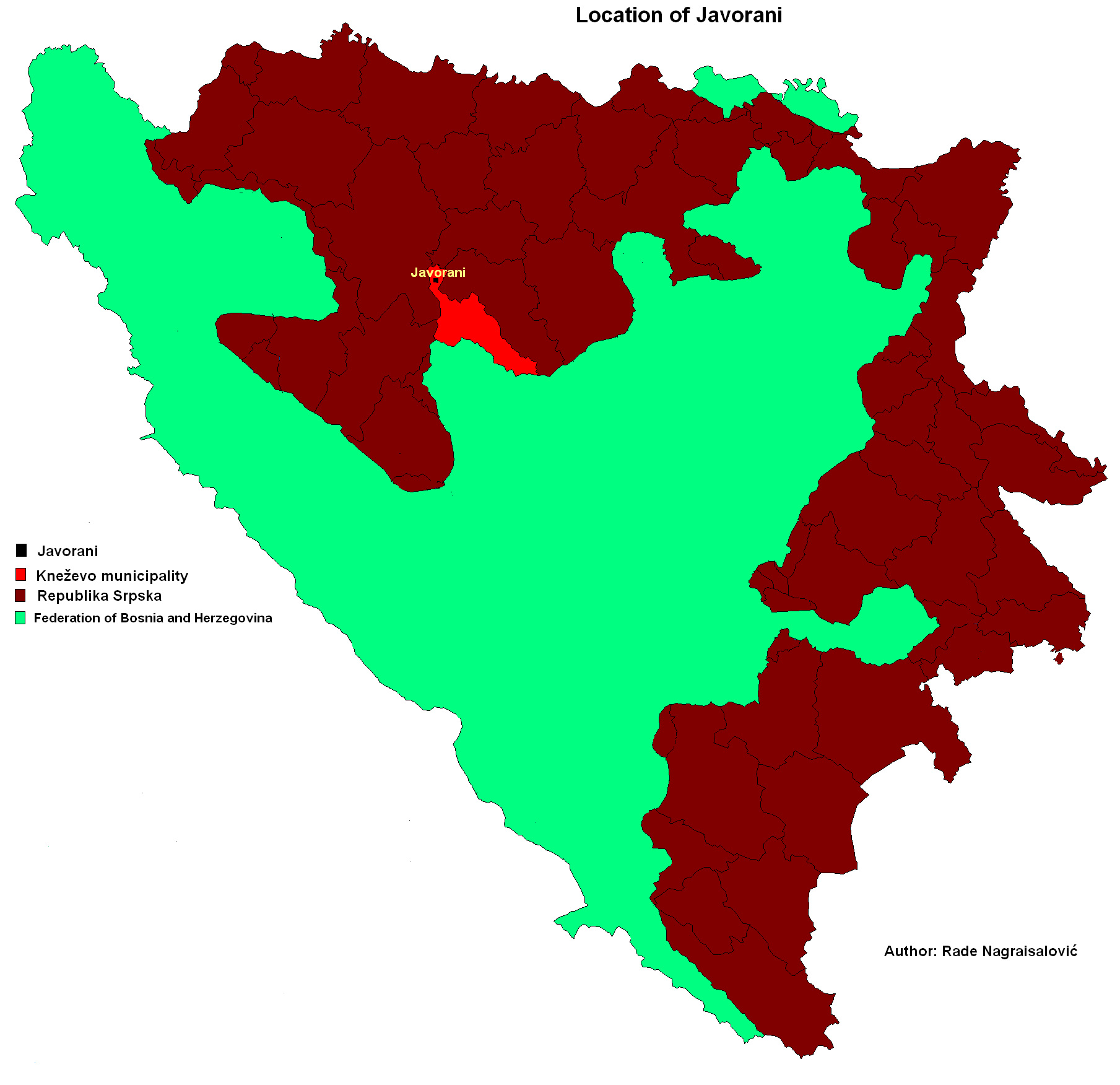
- Location of Javorani in Bosnia and Herzegovina
- Coordinates: 44°37′N 17°15′E
- Country: Bosnia and Herzegovina
- Division: Republika Srpska
- Municipality: Kneževo

Government
  - Local community president: Brane Tubić (SNSD)

Area
  - Total: 25 km^{2} (9.7 sq mi)

Population (1991)
  - Total: 1,289
- Time zone: UTC+2 (EET)
  - Summer (DST): UTC+3 (EEST)
- Postal code: 78233
- Area code: (+387) 51

Javorani (Cyrillic: Јаворани), is a village in Kneževo (Skender Vakuf) municipality, near Banja Luka, Republika Srpska, Bosnia and Herzegovina.

== History ==
Until 1955, Javorani belonged to the former Previle Municipality, Kotor Varoš.

== Population ==
=== Ethnic composition, 1991 census ===
Ethnic composition of Skender Vakuf municipality, by settlements, 1991. census
settlement	total	Serbs	Croats	Muslims	Yugoslavs	others
Javorani	1,289	1,273	1	0	6	9

== Gallery ==
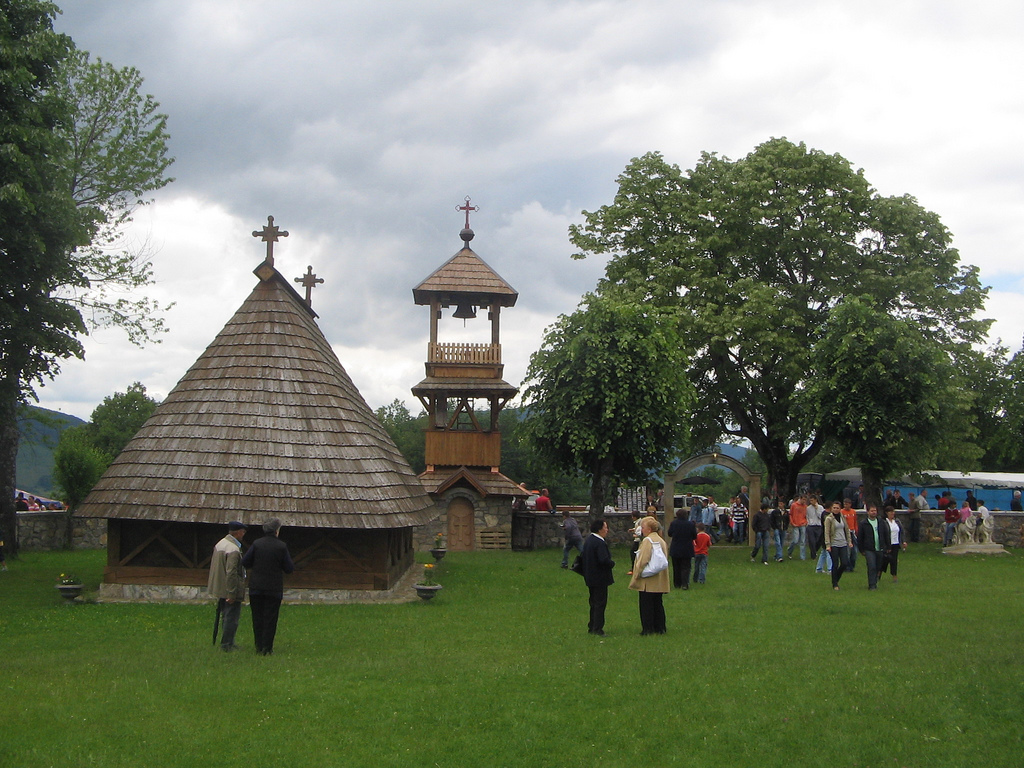
Old St. Nicholas Church from 1757.

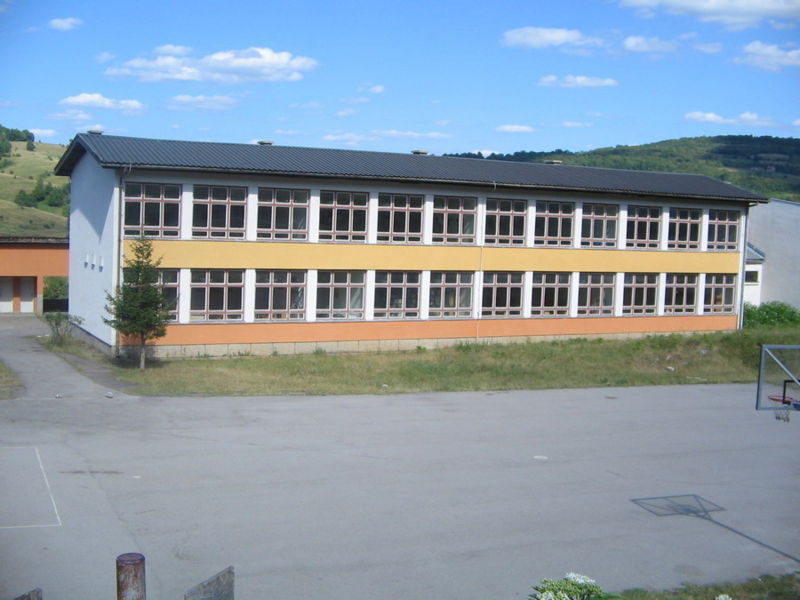
New Primary school in Javorani.

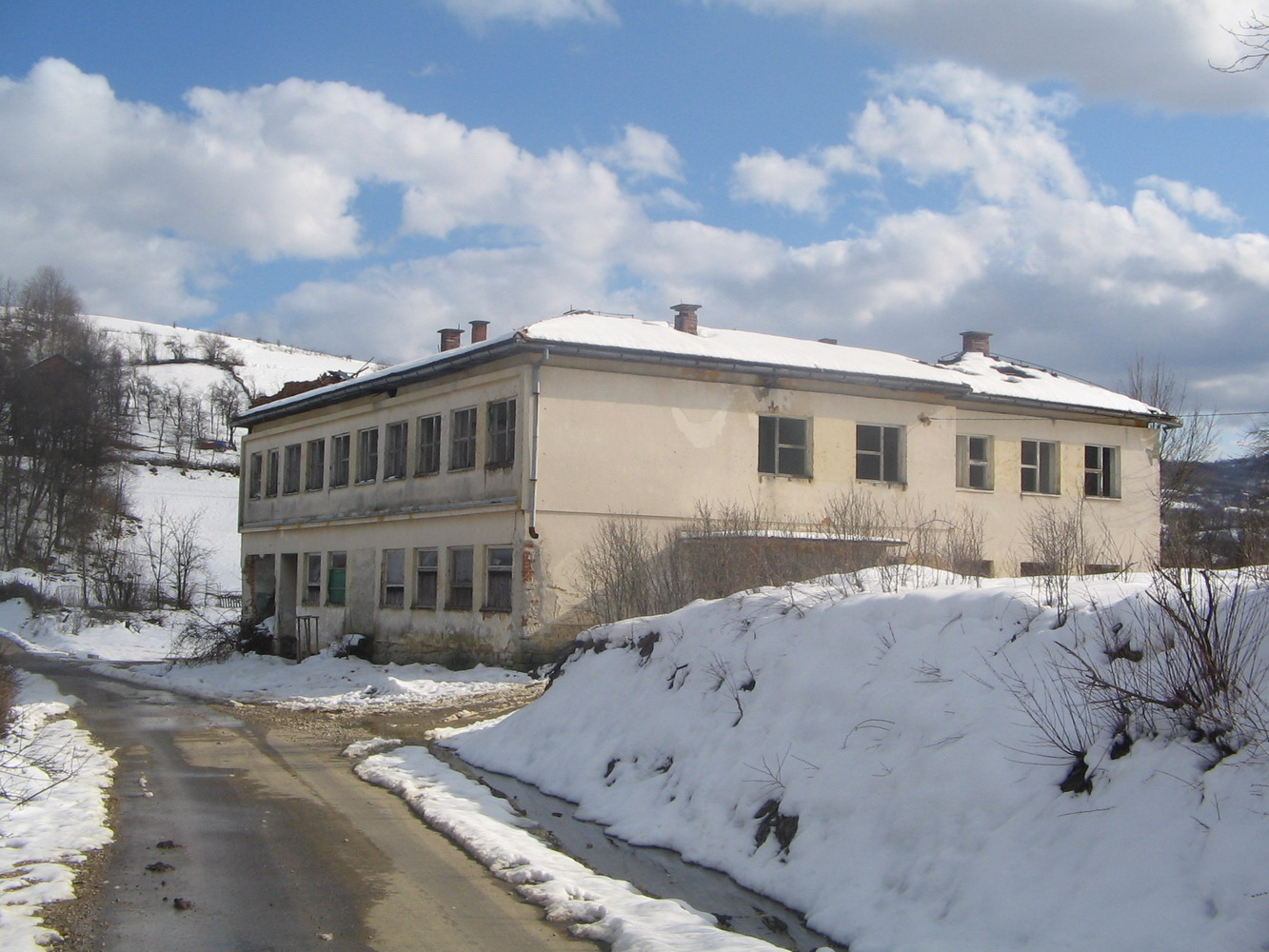
Old Primary school in Javorani.

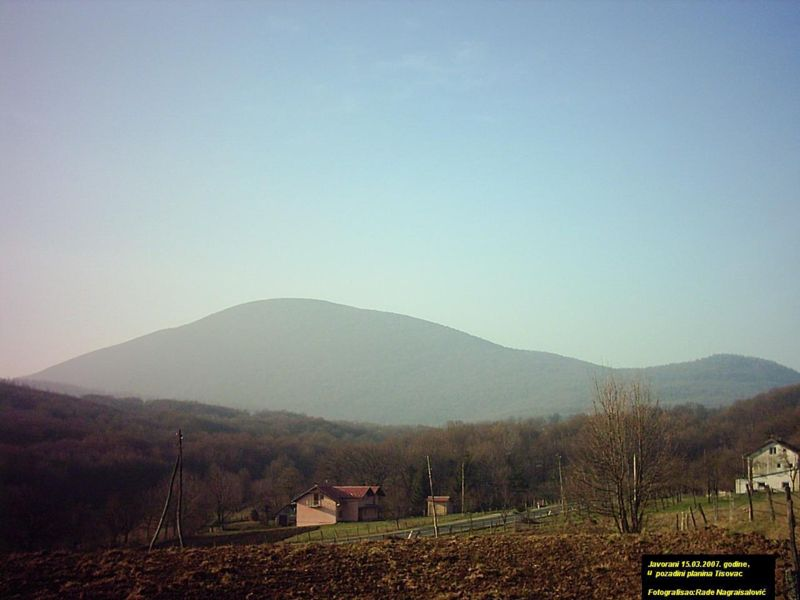
Mountain Tisovac.

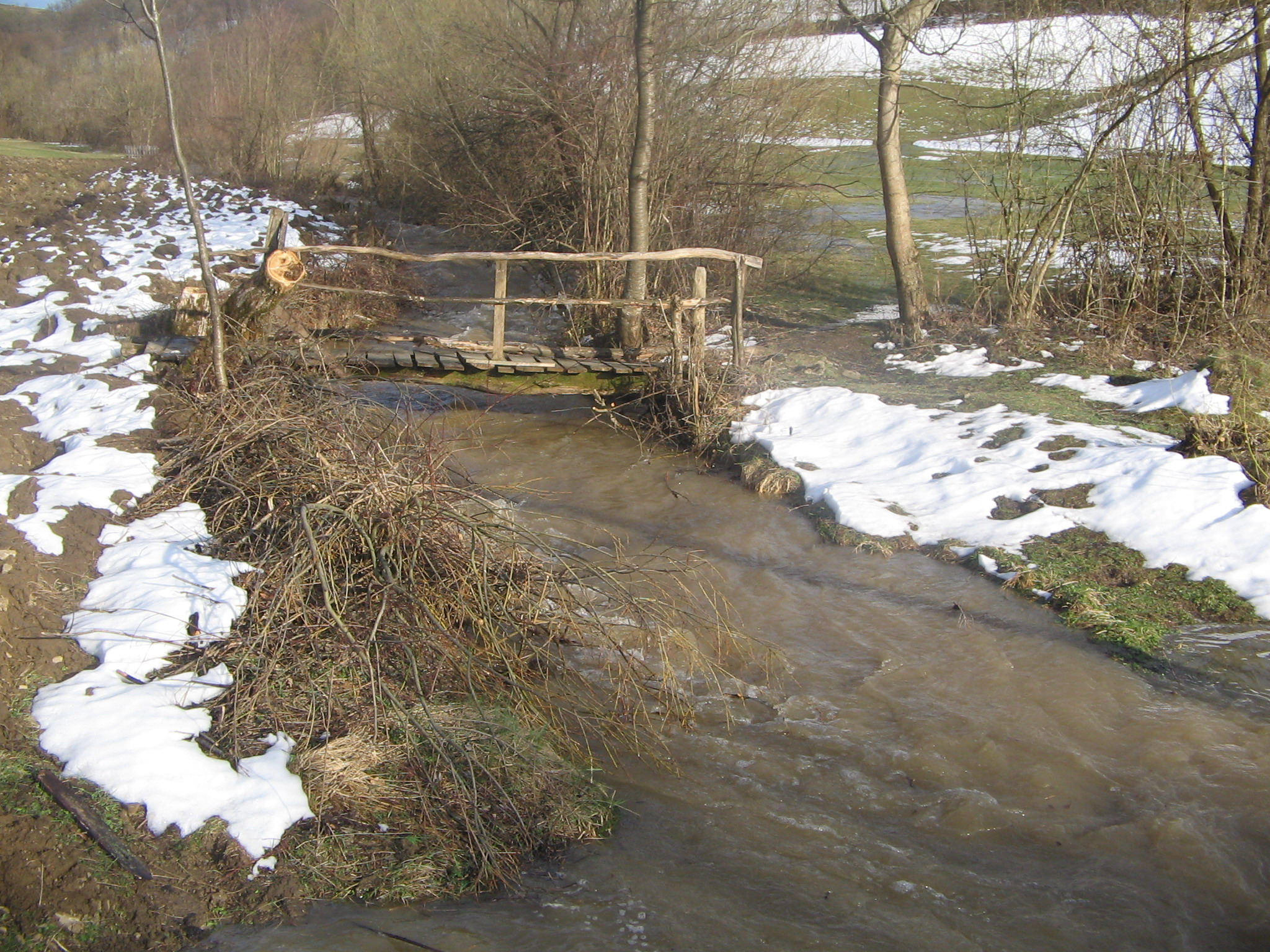
River Kotlovac.

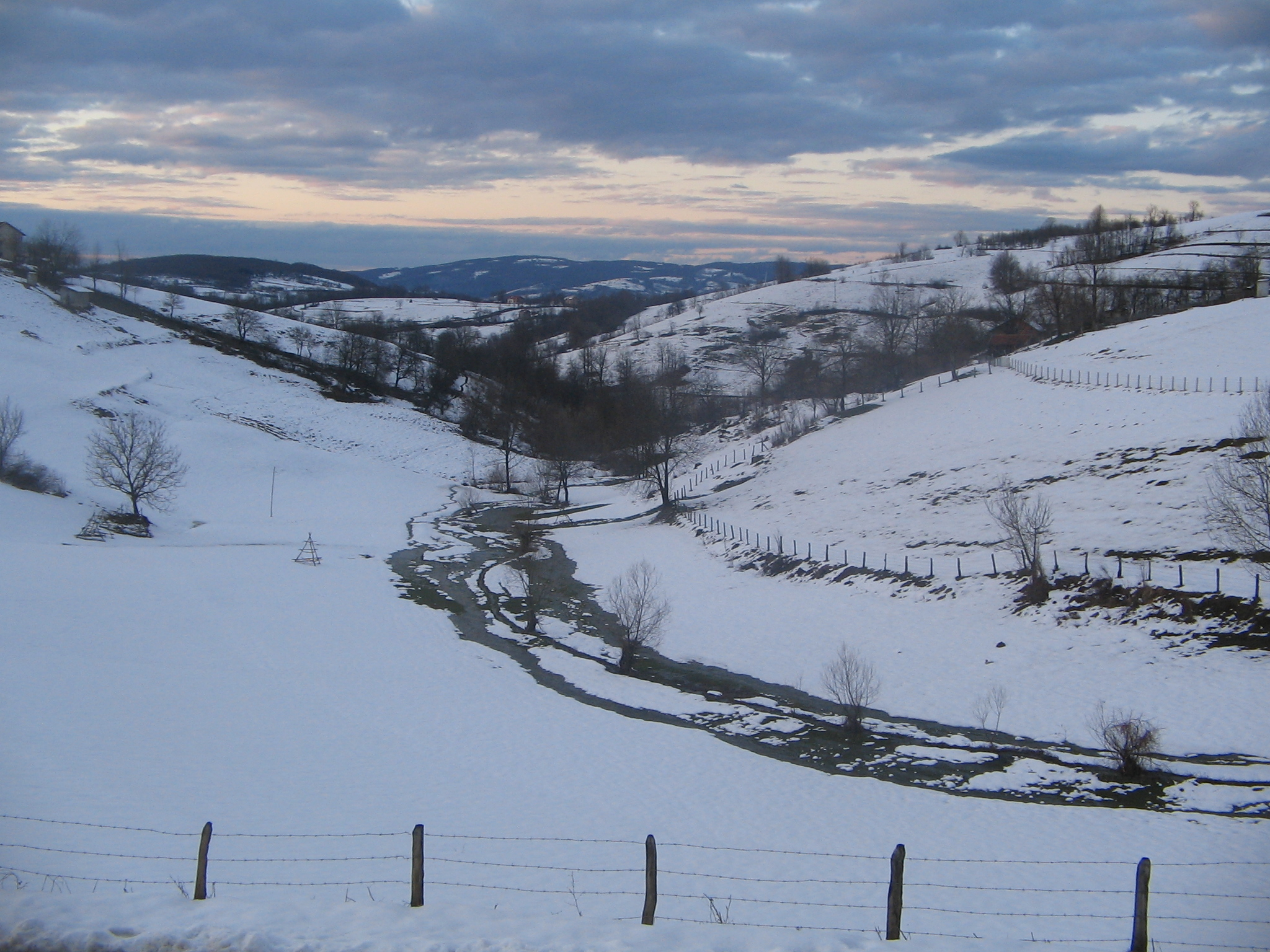
Winter in Javorani.

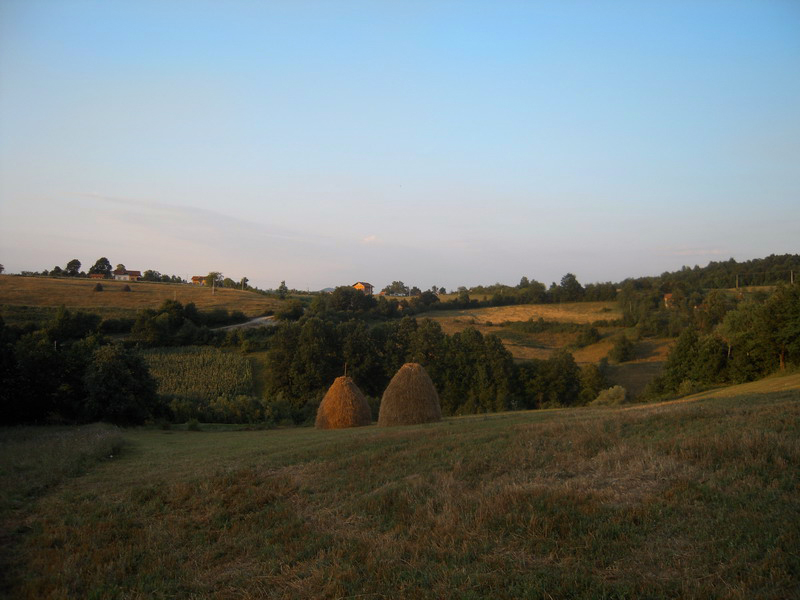
Landscape in Javorani.

== People from Javorani ==
- Lazar Tešanović - One of the Chetniks leader in Bosnia during World War II.

== See also ==
- Old St. Nicholas Church, Javorani
