= Živinice, Kneževo =

Živinice
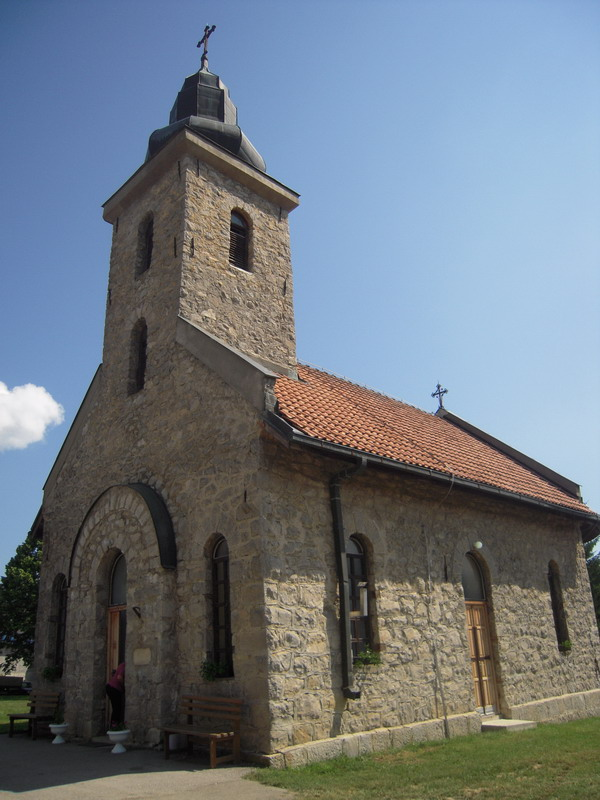
- St. Nicholas Church in Živinice

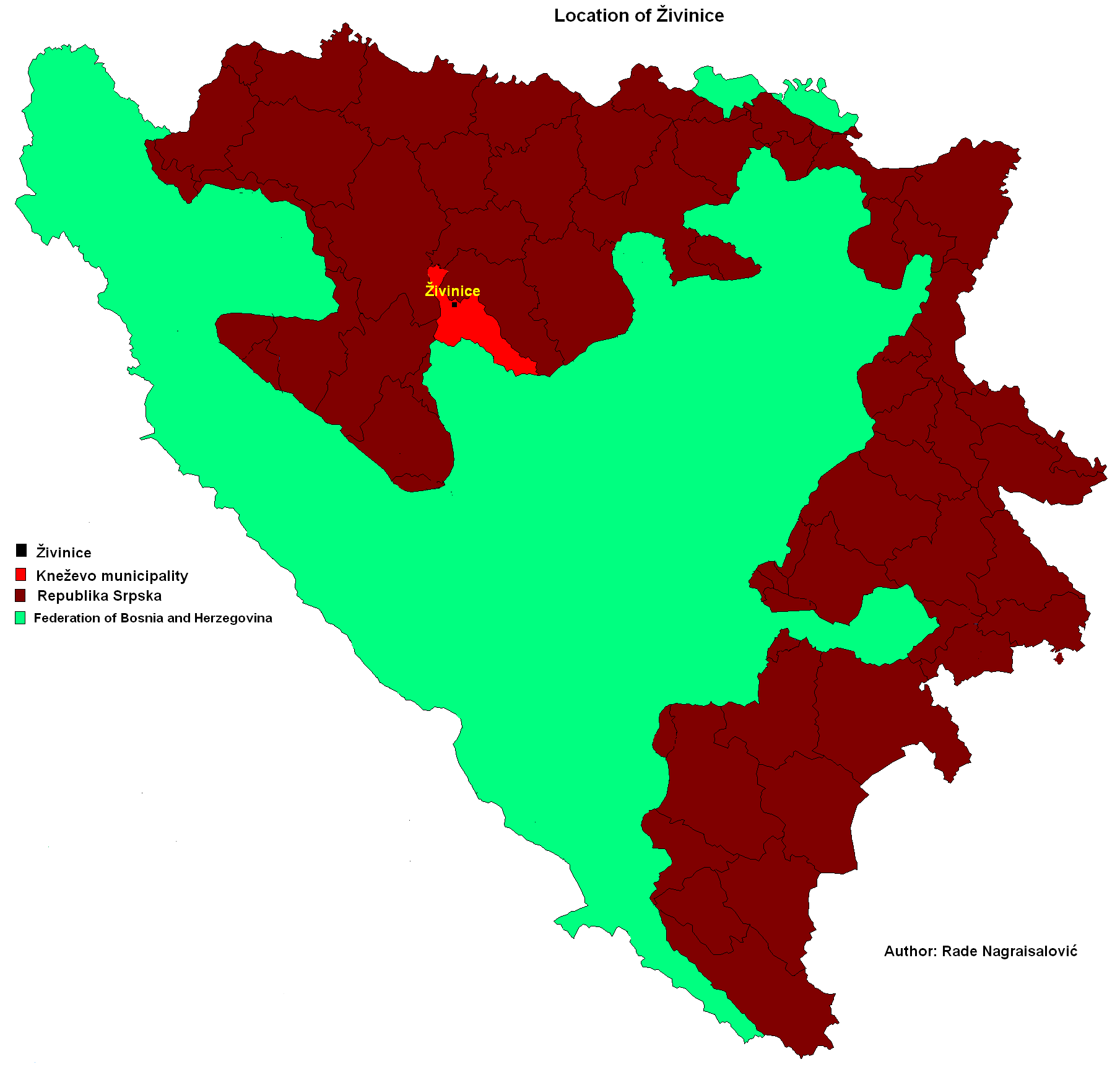
- Location of Živinice in Bosnia and Herzegovina
- Coordinates: 44°32′N 17°22′E
- Country: Bosnia and Herzegovina
- Division: Republika Srpska
- Municipality: Kneževo

Population (1991)
  - Total: 1,223
- Time zone: UTC+2 (EET)
  - Summer (DST): UTC+3 (EEST)
- Area code: (+387) 51

Živinice (Cyrillic: Живинице), is a village in Kneževo municipality, Republika Srpska, Bosnia and Herzegovina.

== Population ==
=== Ethnic composition, 1991 census ===
Ethnic composition of Skender Vakuf municipality, by settlements, 1991. census
settlement	total	Serbs	Muslims	Croats	Yugoslavs	others
Živinice	1,223	1,208	2	0	10	3
