= Bregovi, Kneževo =

Coordinates: 44°30′50″N 17°24′14″E

Bregovi Брегови
- Village
- Interactive map of Bregovi
- Country: Bosnia
- Entity: Republika Srpska

Population (2013)
  - Total: 113
- Time zone: UTC+1 (CET)
  - Summer (DST): UTC+2 (CEST)

Bregovi (Cyrillic: Брегови), is a village in Kneževo, Bosnia and Herzegovina.
