= Chetnik order of battle =

The Yugoslav Army in the Fatherland (Serbian: Југословенска војска у отаџбини / Jugoslovenska vojska u otadžbini; ЈВуО / JVuO), commonly known as the Chetniks (Четници / Četnici), or The Ravna Gora movement (Равногорски покрет / Ravnogorski pokret), was the military formation under the direct command of Draža Mihailović, one of several formations under the umbrella Chetnik Detachments of the Yugoslav Army, officially established on 10 June 1942.

== Composition ==
=== 1943 ===
==== Serbia ====
- Krajinski korpus (Negotin Krajina Corps)
- Mlavski korpus (Mlava Corps)
- Smederevski korpus (Smederevo Corps)
- Avalski korpus (Avala Corps)
- Rudnički korpus (Rudnik Corps)
- 1. ravnogorski korpus (1st Ravna Gora Corps)
- 2. ravnogorski korpus (2nd Ravna Gora Corps)
- 1. šumadijski korpus (1st Šumadija Corps)
- 2. šumadijski korpus (2nd Šumadija Corps)
- Gorska garda / Oplenački korpus (Oplenac Corps)
- Kosmajski korpus (Kosmaj Corps)
- Kolubarski korpus (Kolubara Corps)
- Mačvanski korpus (Mačva Corps)
- Cerski korpus (Cer Corps)
- Valjevski korpus (Valjevo Corps)
- Požeški korpus (Požega Corps)
- Zlatiborski korpus (Zlatibor Corps)
- Javorski korpus (Javor Corps)
- Varvarinski korpus (Varvarin Corps)
- Rasinski korpus (Rasina Corps)
- Jastrebački korpus (Jastrebac Corps)
- Toplički korpus (Toplica Corps)
- Čegarski korpus (Čegar Corps)
- 1. kosovski korpus (1st Kosovo Corps)
- 2. kosovski korpus (2nd Kosovo Corps)
- Vlasinski korpus (Vlasina Corps)
- Nišavski korpus (Nišava Corps)
- Deligradski korpus (Deligrad Corps)
- Timočki korpus (Timok Corps)
- Južnomoravski korpus (South Morava Corps)
- Ivankovački korpus (Ivankovac Corps)
- Vardarski korpus (Vardar Corps)
- Resavski korpus (Resava Corps)
- Jablanički korpus (Jablanica Corps)

==== Montenegro and Bosnia and Herzegovina ====
- Limski korpus (Lim Corps)
- Komski korpus (Kom Corps)
- Durmitorski korpus (Durmitor Corps)
- Nikšićki korpus (Nikšić Corps)
- Ostroški korpus (Ostrog Corps)
- Zetski korpus (Zeta Corps)
- Lovćenski korpus (Lovćen Corps)
- Crmničko-primorski korpus (Crmnica–Primorje Corps)
- Bokokotorski korpus (Bay of Kotor Corps)
- Dubrovački korpus (Dubrovnik Corps)
- Romanijski korpus (Romanija Corps)
- Drinski korpus (Drina Corps)
- Nevesinjski korpus (Nevesinje Corps)
- Trebinski korpus (Trebinje Corps)
- Zenički korpus (Zenica Corps)
- Bosansko-krajiški korpus (Bosanska Krajina Corps)
- Srednjo-bosanski korpus (Middle-Bosnian Corps)
- 2. srednjo-bosanski korpus (2nd Middle-Bosnian Corps)

=== 1944 ===
- Rasina–Toplica Corps group
- 4th Storm Corps group

== See also ==
- Lim-Sandžak Chetnik Detachment
- Dinara Division

== Sources ==
- Branko Latas (1979). Četnički pokret Draže Mihailovića: 1941-1945. Beogradski izdavačko-grafički zavod.
- Jozo Tomasevich (1975). The Chetniks. Stanford University Press. ISBN 978-0-8047-0857-9.
- Matteo Joseph Milazzo (1971). The Chetnik Movement in Yugoslavia, 1941-1945.
- Jozo Tomasevich (1979). Četnici u drugom svjetskom ratu 1941-1945. Sveučilišna naklada Liber.
- Miloš Minić (1993). Oslobodilački ili građanski rat u Jugoslaviji 1941-1945. Agencija "Mir". ISBN 9788682295013.
- Milan Lazić (1997). Ravnogorski pokret: 1941-1945. Institut za noviju istoriju Srbije. ISBN 978-86-7005-019-8.
