= Borak, Bosnia and Herzegovina =

Borak Борак
- Village
- Location in Bosnia and Herzegovina
- Coordinates: 44.463°N 17.387°E
- Country: Bosnia
- Entity: Republika Srpska

Population (1991)
  - Total: 348
- Time zone: UTC+1 (CET)
  - Summer (DST): UTC+2 (CEST)

Borak (Cyrillic: Борак), is a village in Kneževo, Bosnia and Herzegovina.

== Population ==
=== Ethnic composition, 1991 census ===
Ethnic composition of Skender Vakuf municipality, by settlements, 1991. census
settlement	total	Serbs	Croats	Muslims	Yugoslavs	others
Borak	348	345	1	0	0	2
