= Lazar Tešanović =

- Born: Javorani, Condominium of Bosnia and Herzegovina
- Died: March 1947; FPR Yugoslavia
- Military career
- Allegiance: Kingdom of Yugoslavia (–1941); Chetniks (1941–1945); Independent State of Croatia (1942); Government of National Salvation (1943–1945)
- Service years: 1941–1942
- Rank: Major
- Commands: Obilić Detachment (1941–1943); Middle-Bosnian Corps (1943–1946)
- Conflicts: World War II: World War II in Yugoslavia

Lazar Tešanović (Serbian Cyrillic: Лазар Тешановић) was a Serbian schoolteacher and military officer. He was a reserve lieutenant of the Royal Yugoslav Army and later a Chetnik military officer during World War II.

== World War II ==
During the War, Tešanović founded the Obilić Detachment which operated between the two rivers, Vrbas and Vrbanja, and south to the mountain Vlašić. The detachment took a main part in the Lipovac ambush on the Partisan Company led by Mladen Stojanović, who was badly wounded in the fight.

On 23 May 1942, Tešanović entered into an agreement with the Independent State of Croatia, requesting arms and ammunition to fight against the Partisans. He also collaborated with the Nazi Germans.

On 8 July 1943, the Obilić Detachment became part of the Middle-Bosnian Chetniks Corps and Tešanović became commander of that corps.

== See also ==
- Mile Mećava
- Mladen Stojanović
