= Vlatkovići =

Vlatkovići Влатковићи
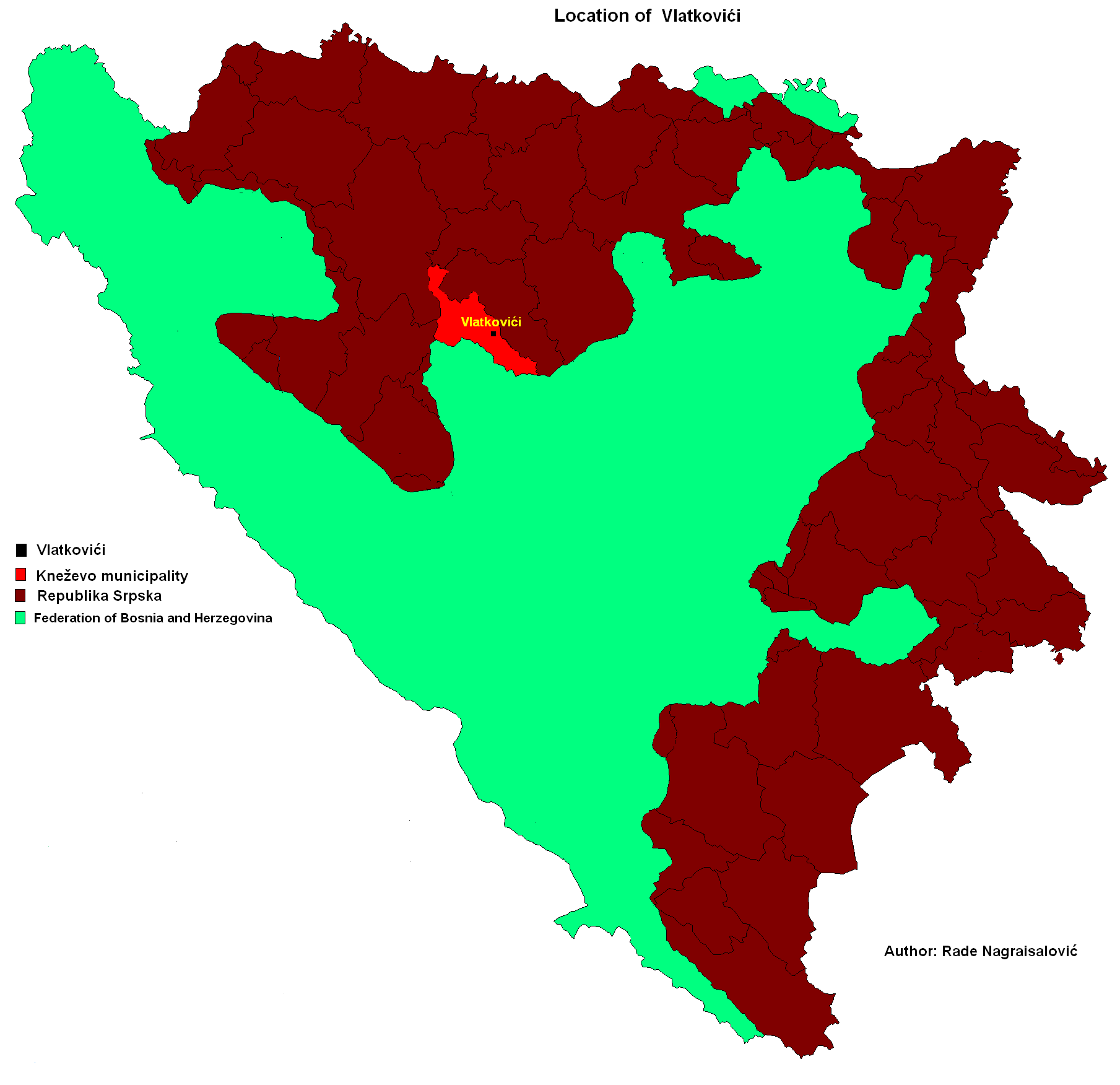
- Location of Vlatkovići in Bosnia and Herzegovina
- Coordinates: 44°25′N 17°29′E
- Country: Bosnia and Herzegovina
- Division: Republika Srpska
- Municipality: Kneževo

Population (1991)
  - Total: 730
- Time zone: UTC+2 (EET)
  - Summer (DST): UTC+3 (EEST)
- Area code: (+387) 51

Vlatkovići (Serbian Cyrillic: Влатковићи) is a village in Kneževo municipality, Republika Srpska, Bosnia and Herzegovina.

== Population ==
=== Ethnic composition, 1991 census ===
Ethnic composition of Skender Vakuf municipality, by settlements, 1991. census
settlement	total	Serbs	Croats	Muslims	Yugoslavs	others
Vlatkovići	730	725	3	0	1	1
