= Old Church of St. Nicholas, Javorani =

Coordinates: 44.6369°N 17.2709°E

Old St. Nicholas Church
- Стари храм светог Николе; Stari hram svetog Nikole
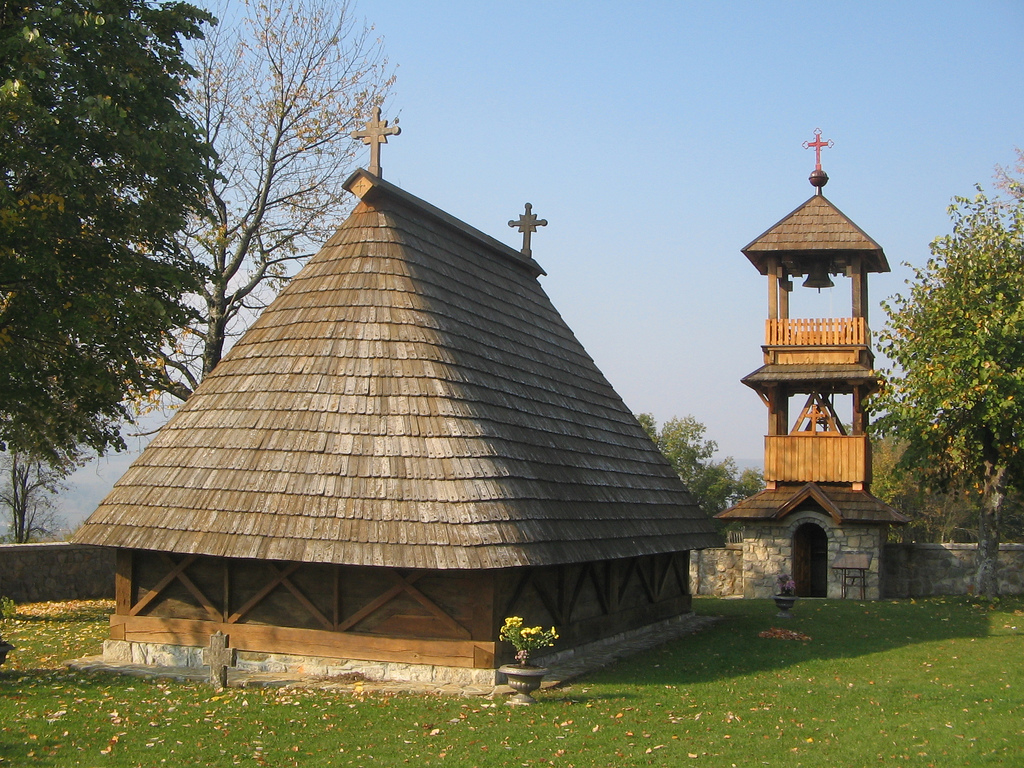
- Old St. Nicholas Church
- Old St. Nicholas Church
- Country: Bosnia
- Denomination: Serbian Orthodox

History
- Dedication: St. Nicholas

Specifications
- Length: 9,46 m
- Height: 5.50 m

Administration
- Archdiocese: Eparchy of Banja Luka

Old St. Nicholas Church or Wooden church in Javorani (Serbian Cyrillic: Стари храм светог Николе/Црква брвнара у Јаворанима) in Javorani is Serbian Orthodox church in Bosnia. The church is dedicated to Saint Nicholas. Church was built in 1756.

== Architecture ==
Church belongs to older type of churches with rectangular foundation without apse part at the site of the altar. The construction material for church was oak tree. Church is 9,46 meter long, 4.92 meter wide and 5.50 meter high.

== History ==
Old Church of St. Nicholas keeps prayer book that contains historical information about monk Neophyte from Gomionica Monastery who was hung by local Ottoman administration in Banja Luka under the accusation of defamation. In 2003-2004 period church was reconstructed. Project of reconstruction was carried on by Republic Institute for Protection of Cultural and Natural Heritage of the Republika Srpska.

== Gallery ==
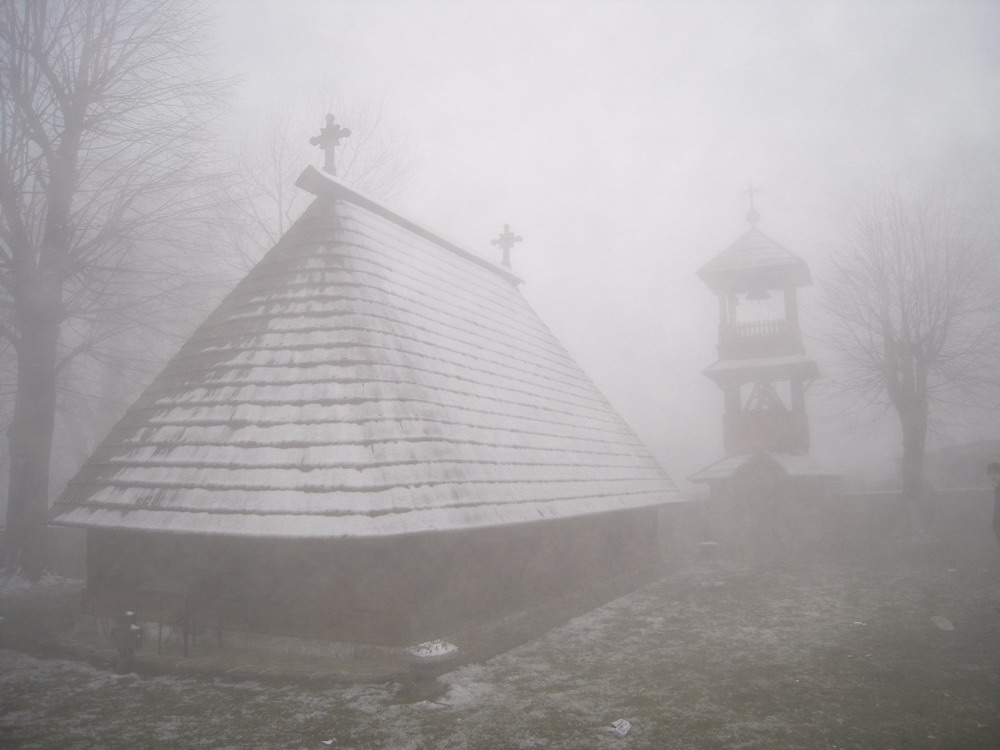

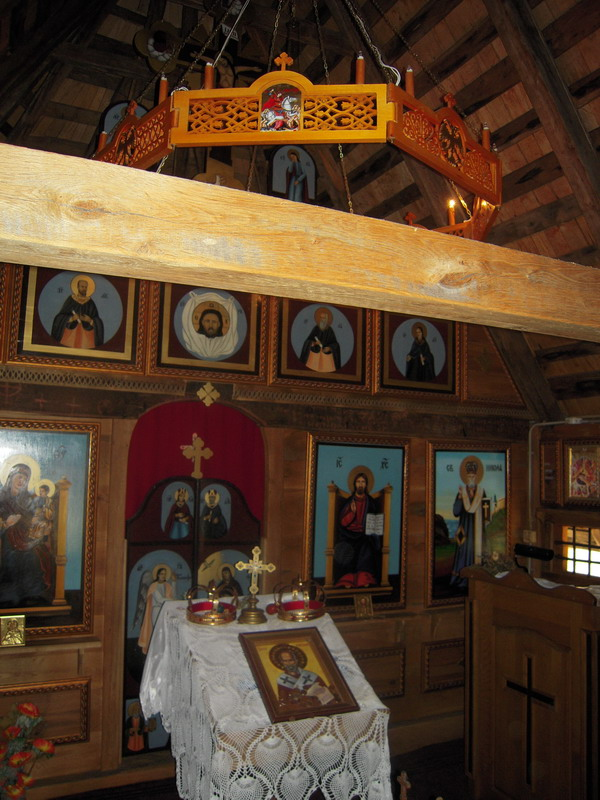

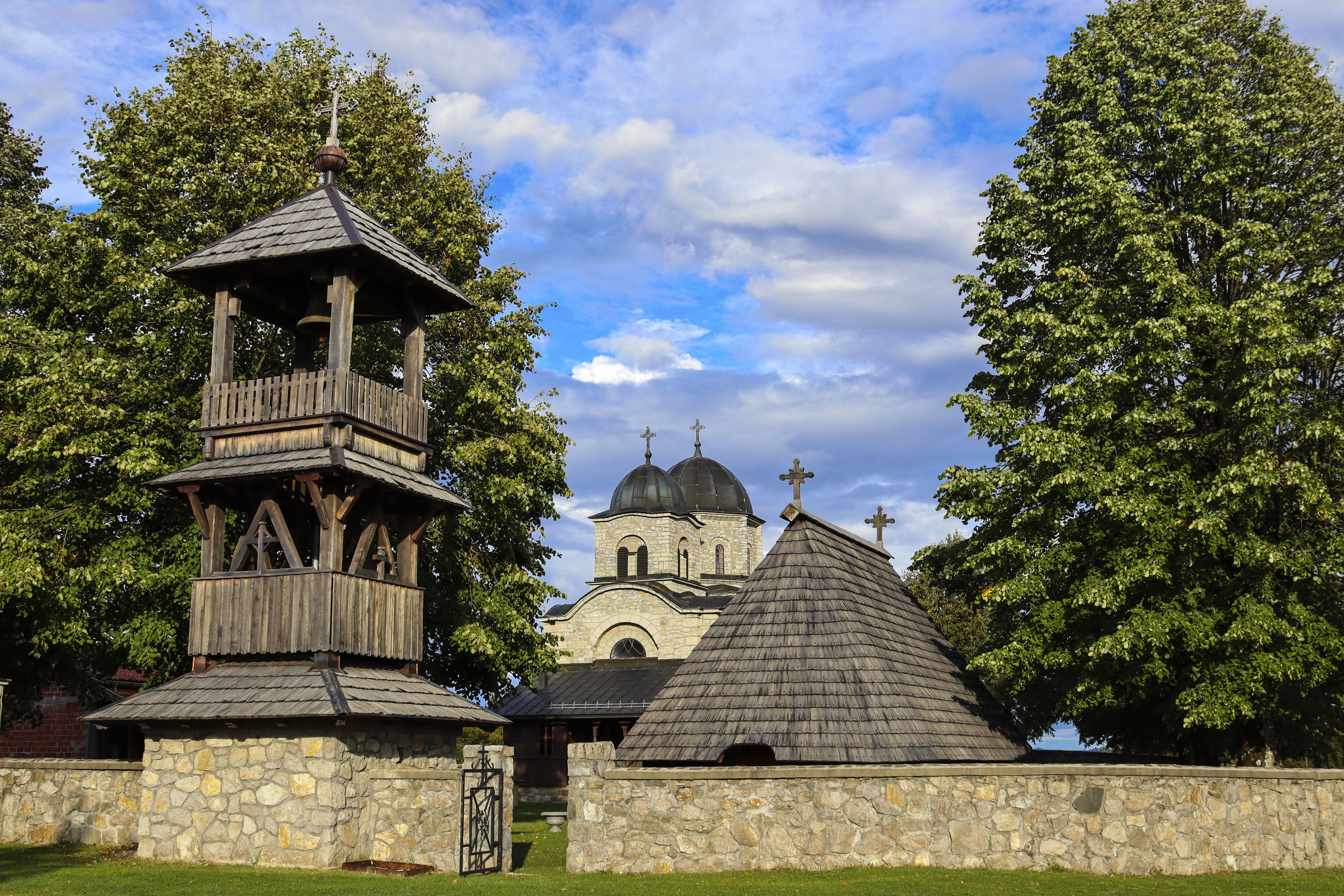

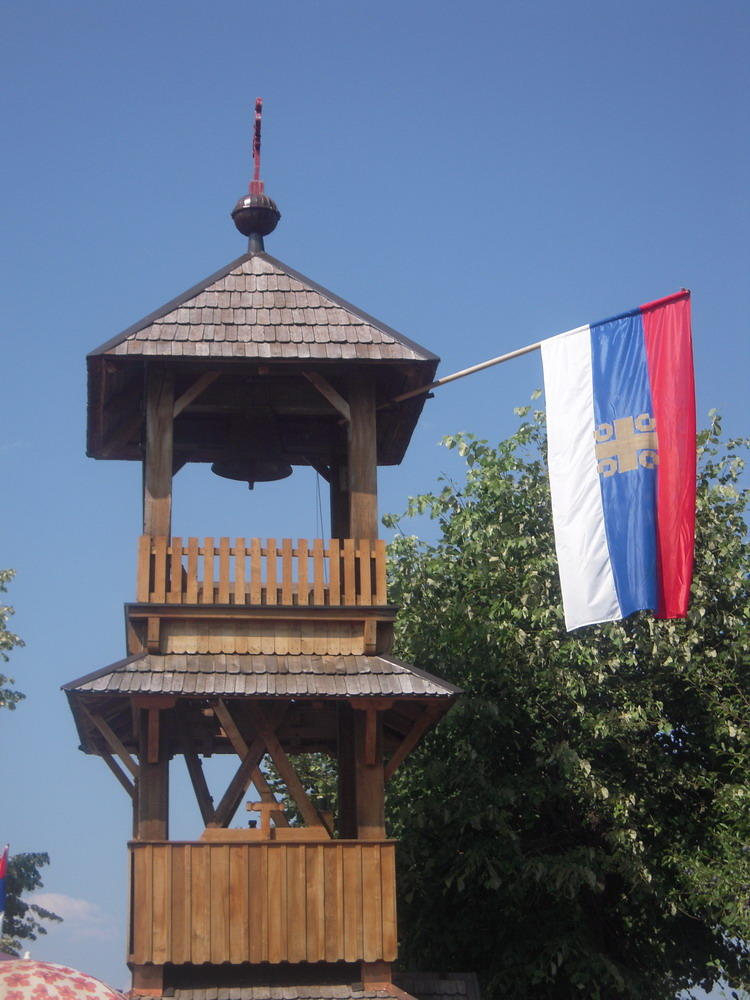

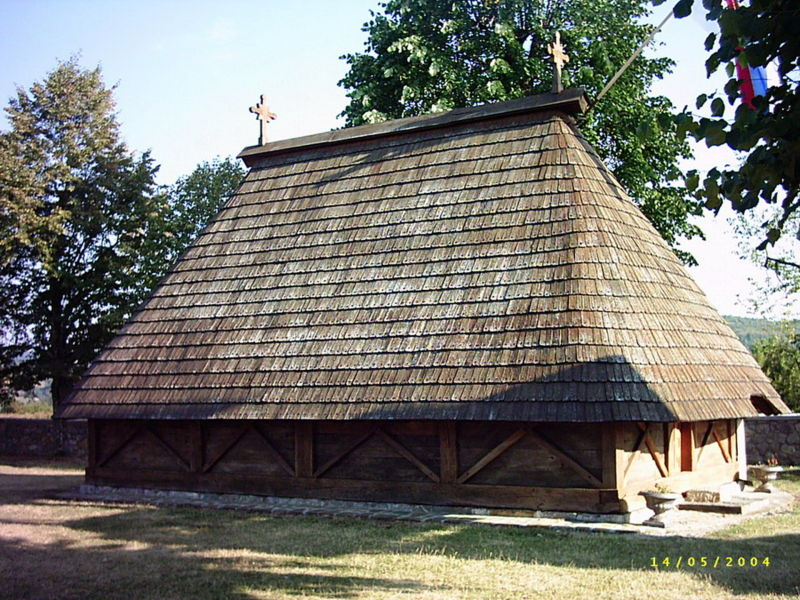

== In folk culture ==
In the local folk tradition there is a legend that at one night church had changed its alleged original location from Grabež and moved to its present location on Cvišić hill. There is also a story about Ottoman Sultan permission to build place of worship but only so big that it can be covered by one oxhide. This limitation was overcome by craftiness, by cutting the skin on the rig.
