= Vardar Corps =

- "For king and fatherland; freedom or death"
- Active: ? — the beginning of March 1944
- Country: Kingdom of Yugoslavia
- Allegiance: Chetniks
- Branch: army
- Role: anti-fascist and anti-communist struggle
- Size: 8,000 soldiers
- Engagements: World War II in Yugoslavia

Commanders
- Commander of the Corp: Stojan Krstić, Captain †
- Commander of the Kumanovo Brigade: Nikola Janjićijević, Lieutenant

The Vardar Corps was a corps of the Yugoslav Army in the Homeland (JVuO) that operated on the left bank of the river Vardar during the World War II in Yugoslavia on the territory of modern-day North Macedonia and southern Serbia. Its commander was former Captain of the Royal Guard of the Royal Yugoslav Army Stojan Krstić. It consisted of four brigades with total number of 8,000 soldiers. Together with Jablanica Corps, South Morava Corps and Flying Corps it belonged under Mountain Staff 110 (Serbian: Горски Штаб 110) located in Sijarinska Banja which was responsible for the territory of Southern Serbia (which included the territory of contemporary North Macedonia). The four brigades were components of this Corps:

- Kumanovo (or Žegligovo) Brigade
- Ristovac Brigade
- Preševo Brigade
- Kriva Palanka Brigade

The commander of Kumanovo Brigade was Lieutenant Nikola Janjićijević. Dragutin Keserović reported to Mihailović that the British mission at Vardar Corps HQ, headed by Captain Pervis, aborted their mission and left Chetniks on 20 December 1943, on the same day when the British mission with Toplica Corps headed by Captain Scott left its HQ.

The territory in which this Corps operated was a triangle between Gnjilane, Vranje and Veles which belonged to the former Yugoslav counties of Preševo, Kriva Palanka, Kumanovo, Ovče Polje and Skoplje.

The Vardar Corps was destroyed by Partisan units from Macedonia and Serbia at the beginning of March 1944.

== Sources ==
- Muzej (1965). Leskovac̆ki zbornik. Narodni muzej u Leskovcu.
- Apostolski, Mihailo (1980). Pogledi vrz jugoslovensko-bugarskite odnosi vo vtorata svetska vojna (in Macedonian). Naša kniga.
- MANU (1973). Simpozium Razvojot i karakteristikite na narodnooslboditelnata vojna i na revolucijata vo Makedonija: Skopje, 9-10 dekemvri 1971 godina. Makedonska akademija na naukite i umetnostite i Institut za nacjonalna istorija.
- Muzej (1986). Vranjski glasnik. Narodni muzej u Vranju.
- Pettibone, Charles D. (April 2014). THE ORGANIZATION AND ORDER OF BATTLE OF MILITARIES IN WORLD WAR II. Trafford Publishing. ISBN 978-1-4907-3386-9.
- Latas, Branko; Dželebdžić, Milovan (1979). Četnički pokret Draže Mihailovića 1941-1945. Beogradski izdavačko-grafički zavod.
