= Zlatibor Corps =

The Zlatibor Corps (Serbian: Златиборски корпус/Zlatiborski korpus) was a corps of the Yugoslav Army in the Homeland (JVuO) centered on the Zlatibor mountain in southwestern Serbia. It was commanded by captain Dušan Radović "Kondor".

== Sources ==
- Branko Latas (1979). Četnički pokret Draže Mihailovića: 1941-1945. Beogradski izdavačko-grafički zavod.
- Jozo Tomasevich (1975). The Chetniks. Stanford University Press. ISBN 978-0-8047-0857-9.
- Matteo Joseph Milazzo (1971). The Chetnik Movement in Yugoslavia, 1941-1945.
- Jozo Tomasevich (1979). Četnici u drugom svjetskom ratu 1941-1945. Sveučilišna naklada Liber.
- Miloš Minić (1993). Oslobodilački ili građanski rat u Jugoslaviji 1941-1945. Agencija "Mir". ISBN 9788682295013.
- Milan Lazić (1997). Ravnogorski pokret: 1941-1945. Institut za noviju istoriju Srbije. ISBN 978-86-7005-019-8.
