= Serbian police =

Serbian police may refer to:

- Police of Serbia
- Police of Republika Srpska
