= Ilomska waterfalls =

Coordinates: 44°22′31″N 17°30′37″E

Ilomska Waterfalls are a set of waterfalls on the Ilomska river, right confluent of Ugar river in Central Bosnia. Both of these rivers rise from Vlašić Mountain massif (Prelivode area).

Lesser of two largest waterfalls in Ilomska canyon

The largest waterfall of Ilomska (≈40 m)

== Overview ==
Ilomska waterfalls include Veliki vodopad and Mali vodopad (Great, and Lesser Waterfall). To those, several other waterfalls could be joined in the upper and middle course. Great and Lesser waterfalls are located about 2 km from the mouth of the Ilomska river into the Ugar, in a narrow canyon at the Under-Vlašić-mountain plateau between almost vertical Korićan cliffs Korićanske stijene, and Marići and Đenići villages. Both waterfalls are at the altitude of 750 –780 m above sea level, that is about 350 meters lower than the surrounding imljani – Korićani plateau.

A large waterfall is high even around 40 m but it is still unobtrusive from the surrounding (Korićanske – imljanskog) plateau. In this wild nature, waterfalls more and more attract the attention of hikers, tourists and fishermen. A vertical cliff, over which the river falls, is also suitable for alpine endeavors.

Besides these, at the upper and middle Ilomska river there are two other waterfalls, one under Manatovac tributary, routed to water supply Skender Vakuf, and Sinjac, below Nikodinović hamlet, Petrovo polje (Peter's Field) village, favorite bathing area of the local youth during the summer.

An attractive estuary Ilomska river has been devastated by the building of “small” hydroelectric station despite the proclamation of the Ilomska canyon as protected a natural area, with registration data:

- ID = PZPP005 Zaštićeni prirodni predio Vlašić Ilomska – Modro polje
  IUCN Category: V
  Municipality: Kneževo/(Skender Vakuf)
- Note: Only waterfalls and naked cliffs are under protection but not the rest of the Ilomska area, extremely rich in natural beauties and coniferous forests.

== See also ==
- Ilomska
- Ugar
