= Ćorkovići =

Ćorkovići – Ћорковићи
- Village
- Location in Bosnia and Herzegovina Ćorkovići – Ћорковићи (Bosnia and Herzegovina)
- Coordinates: 44°25′17″N 17°32′48″E
- Country: Bosnia and Herzegovina
- Entity: Republika Srpska
- Municipality: Kotor Varoš
- Highest elevation: 930 m (3,050 ft)
- Lowest elevation: 910 m (2,990 ft)

Population (1991)
  - Total: 175
- Demonym: Ćorkovićani
- Time zone: Central European
- Area code: +387 (051)
- Website: www.opstinakotorvaros.com

Ćorkovići (Ћорковићи) is populated place in Bosnia and Herzegovina, Kotor Varoš Municipality in Republika Srpska. In 1991, in this village lived 175 inhabitants, and 2013. : 101.

== Geography ==
Ćorkovići is situated at the steep, south-western slopes Petrovo polje (Peter's fields), at an altitude of about 910-930m. Below the village flows Ćorkovac, left tributary Vrbanja river. It is traversed by the local road connecting regional road R-440: Kotor Varoš – Obodnik – Šiprage – Kruševo Brdo communicating Skender Vakuf – Imljani – Korićani – Vitovlje – Turbe through Ilomska. Its distance from Šiprage is about 8 km, and from the Kotor Varoš about 40 km.

== Population ==
Nationality	1991.	2013.
Srbi	175	101
Others	0	0
Total	175	101
