= Kobilja (river) =

- Location within Bosnia and Herzegovina
- Native name: Кобиља (Serbian)

Location
- Country: Bosnia and Herzegovina

Physical characteristics
- Source
  - location: Ježica - Srebrenik masiff
  - coordinates: 44°24′59″N 17°29′41″E
  - elevation: 1,010 m (3,310 ft)
- Mouth
  - location: Ugar
  - coordinates: 44°25′36″N 17°24′47″E
- Length: 5 km (3.1 mi)
- Discharge
  - average: Bosnia and Herzegovina

Basin features
- Progression: Ugar→ Vrbas→ Sava→ Danube→ Black Sea

Kobilja (Serbian Cyrillic: Кобиља) is a river in Central Bosnia, between Skender Vakuf and Imljani. It is a right bank tributary of the Ugar River.

It rises at southeast the slopes of Ježica – Srebrenik masiff, flowing southeast at around 1,010 metres (3,310 ft) above sea level. The river drains the central part of the northern slopes of the Dinaric mountain massif, with a length of 5 kilometres (3.1 mi).

Kobilja occurs from several sources-bald head, of which the most is Srebrenik (1,010 m), which rises on the south-eastern slopes of the samenamed elevation (Srebrenik, 1,131 m), from the mountain languages (1,276 m). The band around the top is rich in strong sources of drinking water, from which begin the stream basins of the Ugar and Vrbanja rivers. From the Djevojačka ravan (Girls' Plane, above Dunići rocks and Demićka river) to Vakufske Njive (Vaqf Fields) there are over 50 streams. Srebrenik is known locally and as a tanzitno resting place.

Among the many smaller tributaries, the most important right stream is Vukovica, and left are: Strašivi potok, and Zlovarski potok (streams).

Watershed of the two basins extends along local roads Skender Vakuf - Turbe - Travnik (via Ilomska, Korićani and Vitovlje). All Ugar's streams flow into Kobilja, and Vrbanja's in Demićka, Grabovička river, and Duboka.

Whole flow of Kobilja is in the municipality of Skender Vakuf. During 1960th, at Kobilji and its tributaries, there were 20 mills.

== See also ==
- Ilomska
- Pljačkovac
- Imljani
- Skender-Vakuf
