= Donji Korićani, Kneževo =

Donji Korićani Доњи Корићани
- Village
- Location in Bosnia and Herzegovina
- Coordinates: 44.3697°N 17.5236°E
- Country: Bosnia and Herzegovina
- Entity: Republika Srpska
- Municipality: Kneževo
- Highest elevation: 1,200 m (3,900 ft)
- Lowest elevation: 1,150 m (3,770 ft)

Population (1991)
  - Total: 650
- Area code: (+387) 51

Donji Korićani (Serbian: Доњи Корићани) is populated place in Bosnia and Herzegovina, Republika Srpska, Kneževo Municipality. The village is located on a hill (about 1150 m) between Pougarje and Ilomska's branch of Korićanske stijene.

On census year 2013, in the Donji Korićani were a total of 105 inhabitants.

== History ==
The settlement Donji Korićani to the War in Bosnia and Herzegovina (1992-1995) in general was located in the Travnik Municipality.

== Population ==
Donji Korićani;Census Year 2013: Total of 105 inhabitants
Census Year	1991.	1981.	1971.
Serbs	477 (72,60%)	428 (72,79%)	470 (77,30%)
Croats	173 (26,33%)	151 (25,68%)	134 (22,04%)
Muslims	–	–	3 (0,493%)
Yugoslavs	–	8 (1,361%)	–
Others and unknown	–	1 (0,170%)	1 (0,164%)
Total	650	588	608

== See also ==
- Korićani
- Korićanske stijene
- Vlašić
- Pougarje (valley)
