= 1984 Winter Olympics torch relay =

- Host city: Sarajevo, Yugoslavia (now Bosnia and Herzegovina)
- Countries visited: Greece, Yugoslavia (now Bosnia and Herzegovina, Kosovo, Serbia, Montenegro, Macedonia, Croatia, and Slovenia)
- Distance: 5,289 kilometres (3,286 mi)
- Torchbearers: 1,600
- Start date: 29 January 1984
- End date: 8 February 1984
- Torch designer: Boris Tutschin

The 1984 Winter Olympics torch relay was run from 29 January 1984 until 8 February 1984 prior to the 1984 Winter Olympics in Sarajevo, Yugoslavia. The route covered around 5,289 kilometres (3,286 mi) and involved over 1,600 torchbearers. Sanda Dubravčić lit the cauldron at the opening ceremony.

== Route ==
=== East Yugoslavia ===
Route	Map
Dubrovnik; Trebinje	1984 Winter Olympics torch relay is located in Croatia
Nikšić; Cetinje; Titograd; Ulcinj; Kolašin; Mojkovac; Durmitor; Bijelo Polje; Berane; Rožaje	1984 Winter Olympics torch relay is located in Montenegro
Novi Pazar; Sjenica; Raška; Kopaonik	1984 Winter Olympics torch relay is located in Serbia
Mitrovica; Pristina; Peć; Prizren; Brezovica	1984 Winter Olympics torch relay is located in Kosovo
Tetovo; Popova Šapka; Mavrovo; Kičevo; Ohrid; Resen; Bitola; Skopje; Titov Veles; Štip; Kočani; Kumanovo	1984 Winter Olympics torch relay is located in North Macedonia
Vranje; Besna Kobila; Kriva Feja; Leskovac; Pirot; Niš; Prokuplje; Zaječar; Ćuprija; Bor; Svetozarevo; Kragujevac; Velika Plana; Belgrade	1984 Winter Olympics torch relay is located in Serbia
Pančevo; Vršac; Bela Crkva; Zrenjanin; Bečej; Senta; Kikinda; Subotica; Bačka Topola; Sombor; Titov Vrbas; Osijek; Vukovar; Novi Sad; Fruška Gora; Ruma	1984 Winter Olympics torch relay is located in Vojvodina
Šabac; Valjevo; Titovo Užice; Zlatibor; Loznica; Tršić	1984 Winter Olympics torch relay is located in Serbia
Zvornik; Srebrenica; Bijeljina; Brčko; Bosanski Šamac; Derventa; Doboj; Zavidovići; Tuzla; Kladanj; Vlasenica; Višegrad; Goražde; Foča; Tjentište; Kalinovik; Jahorina; Bjelašnica; Fojnica; Sokolac; Romanija; Breza; Vareš; Sarajevo	1984 Winter Olympics torch relay is located in Bosnia and Herzegovina

=== West Yugoslavia ===
Route	Map
Dubrovnik; Čapljina; Mostar; Rujište; Jablanica; Prozor; Bugojno; Kupres; Šuica; Livno	1984 Winter Olympics torch relay is located in Bosnia and Herzegovina
Split; Sinj; Vis; Makarska; Podgora; Šibenik; Zadar; Pag; Karlobag; Rijeka; Delnice; Opatija; Mrkopalj; Pula; Brijuni; Rovinj; Poreč	1984 Winter Olympics torch relay is located in Croatia
Koper; Izola; Piran; Sežana; Postojna; Nova Gorica; Cerkno; Tolmin; Ljubljana; Vrhnika; Logatec; Kranjska Gora; Planica; Cerknica; Jesenice; Bled; Radovljica; Begunje; Tržič; Kranj; Škofja Loka; Domžale; Trbovlje; Titov Velenje; Slovenj Gradec; Ravne na Koroškem; Maribor; Celje	1984 Winter Olympics torch relay is located in Slovenia
Kumrovec; Varaždin; Karlovac; Zagreb; Bjelovar; Sljeme; Virovitica; Sisak	1984 Winter Olympics torch relay is located in Croatia
Bosanski Novi; Bosanska Dubica; Bosanska Krupa; Bihać; Cazin; Velika Kladuša; Plitvička Jezera; Titova Korenica; Plješivica; Bosanski Petrovac; Titov Drvar; Ključ; Bosansko Grahovo; Prijedor; Kozara; Banja Luka; Skender Vakuf; Mrkonjić Grad; Jajce; Ranča; Travnik; Zenica; Vlašić; Kakanj; Visoko; Sarajevo	1984 Winter Olympics torch relay is located in Bosnia and Herzegovina
