= Crna River (Ilomska) =

- Location within Bosnia and Herzegovina
- Native name: Црна ријека (Bosnian)

Location
- Country: Bosnia and Herzegovina

Physical characteristics
- Source
  - location: Vlašić
  - elevation: 1,380 m (4,530 ft)
- Mouth
  - location: Ilomska
  - coordinates: 44°23′25″N 17°33′08″E
- Length: 8 km (5.0 mi)

Basin features
- Progression: Ilomska→ Ugar→ Vrbas→ Sava→ Danube→ Black Sea

Crna River (Bosnian: Crna rijeka / Црна ријека, "Black River") is the larger left tributary of Ilomska River. It originates from Duboki jarak ("Deep trench") at an altitude of 1380 m, below Blatnica Hill. The upper waterflow goes south-east, between Omanjača (right bank, 1355m) and the Ravan (plain, 1304 m) on Runjavica (1350 m), above the eponymous village (Blatnica). After leaving the ravine, the river flows around Jove masiff turn right to the north to the mouth.During Austro-Hungarian rule, a narrow-gauge railway was built through the forest along the river for the exploitation of forest resources. The timber industry continues to harvest spruce and fir trees there.
