= Gornji Korićani =

Gornji Korićani Горњи Корићани
- Village
- Location within Bosnia and Herzegovina
- Coordinates: 44.352776°N 17.547270°E
- Country: Bosnia and Herzegovina
- Entity: Republika Srpska; Federation of Bosnia and Herzegovina
- Region Canton: Banja Luka; Central Bosnia
- Municipality: Kneževo; Travnik

Area
  - Total: 6.10 sq mi (15.80 km^{2})
- Highest elevation: 4,200 ft (1,280 m)
- Lowest elevation: 4,130 ft (1,260 m)

Population (2013)
  - Total: 77
  - Density: 13/sq mi (4.9/km^{2})
- Time zone: UTC+1 (CET)
  - Summer (DST): UTC+2 (CEST)
- Area code: +387 (030)

Gornji Korićani (Serbian Cyrillic: Горњи Корићани) is a village in the municipalities of Travnik and Kneževo, Bosnia and Herzegovina.

The village is located on a hill (about 1270 m) between Pljačkovac (south-west) and Crna rijeka (Black River), a tributary of Ilomska (northeast).

== Population ==
Gornji Korićani; Census Year 2013: Total of 77 inhabitants
| Census Year | 1991. | 1981. | 1971. |
|---|---|---|---|
| Croats | 754 (99,87%) | 665 (97,94%) | 568 (100,0%) |
| Serbs | – | 3 (0,442%) | – |
| Yugoslavs | – | 5 (0,736%) | – |
| Others and unknown | 1 (0,132%) | 6 (0,884%) | – |
| Total | 755 | 679 | 568 |

== See also ==
- Korićani Cliffs massacre
