= Ugrić =

Tributary of the Ugar River in Central Bosnia

- Location within Bosnia and Herzegovina
- Native name: Угрић (Bosnian)

Location
- Country: Bosnia and Herzegovina

Physical characteristics
- Source
  - location: Krčevine
  - coordinates: 44°28′55″N 17°24′00″E
  - elevation: 940 m (3,080 ft)
- Mouth
  - location: Ugar
  - coordinates: 44°27′18″N 17°21′53″E
- Length: 4 km (2.5 mi)

Basin features
- Progression: Ugar→ Vrbas→ Sava→ Danube→ Black Sea

Ugrić is the right tributary of the Ugar River in Central Bosnia. It is about 4 kilometres (2.5 mi) in length, and its source is on the slopes of the Bosnian mountain of Vlašić in the locality of Krčevine. It is an essential body of water for surrounding wildlife.

Ugrić springs from the fountain of the Osmanovac stream; elevation 940 m, in the region of Krčevine. Above the Krčevina region there is communications Skender Vakuf - Turbe - Travnik, which marks a watershed between the basins of Ugar and Vrbanja. It runs to the southwest, between Ćelehovsko hill (909 m) and by Barišića strane (Glavica, 897 m).

From its source the river enters into a deep and narrow canyon, which is 854 m n/a, with the depth of about 400 m. From this level, the small river was named Ugrić. On Ugrić waterflow in 1960 there were a dozen mills. Along this river, as well as other Ugar's tributaries there are numerous cascades and waterfalls.
