= Mala Ilomska =

- Location within Bosnia and Herzegovina
- Native name: Мала Иломска (Bosnian)

Location
- Country: Bosnia and Herzegovina

Physical characteristics
- Source
  - location: Vlašić masiff: Omarike
  - coordinates: 44°17′10″N 17°39′20″E
  - elevation: 1,130 m (3,710 ft)
- Mouth
  - location: Ilomska
- Length: 2 km (1.2 mi)

Basin features
- Progression: Ilomska→ Ugar→ Vrbas→ Sava→ Danube→ Black Sea

Mala Ilomska is a very short (around 2 km) right tributary of Ilomska – one of right tributaries of Ugar − in Central Bosnia, Bosnia and Herzegovina, Skender Vakuf Municipality. This small river is formed from seven springs and streams at the Petrovo field, on the southwestern slopes of the hill Omarike (1243 m). The min source is at an altitude of about 1230 m, and one of the registered is Bijeljino spring, near the hamlet of Nikodinovići. In addition to these, there are no significant tributaries.

== See also ==
- Petrovo Polje village
