= Mudrike =

- Village
- Location within Bosnia and Herzegovina
- Coordinates: 44.306747°N 17.536004°E
- Country: Bosnia and Herzegovina
- Entity: Federation of Bosnia and Herzegovina
- Canton: Central Bosnia
- Municipality: Travnik

Area
  - Total: 3.27 sq mi (8.48 km^{2})
- Highest elevation: 3,704 ft (1,129 m)
- Lowest elevation: 3,600 ft (1,100 m)

Population (2013)
  - Total: 550
  - Density: 170/sq mi (65/km^{2})
- Time zone: UTC+1 (CET)
  - Summer (DST): UTC+2 (CEST)
- Area code: +387 (030)

Mudrike is populated place in Bosnia and Herzegovina, Travnik Municipality.

== Climate ==
In Mudrike there is a typical Mountain Climate of Central Bosnia.

== Population ==
Mudrike Census 2013: Total 556 citizens
Census Year	2013.	1991.	1981.	1971.
Bosniaks	536 (97,5%)	579 (77,41%)	557 (75,27%)	491 (71,99%)
Serbs	9 (1,69%)	148 (19,79%)	180 (24,32%)	189 (27,71%)
Croats	–	1 (0,147%)	–	–
Yugoslavs	–	–	3 (0,405%)	1 (0,147%)
Others and unknown	5 (0,9%)	20 (2,674%)	–	1 (0,147%)
Total	550	748	740	682

== See also ==
- Ugar
- Vlašić
- Pljačkovac
