= Vitovlje =

Vitovlje may refer to:

- Vitovlje, Nova Gorica, in western Slovenia
- Vitovlje, Travnik, in central Bosnia
- Vitovlje Malo, a village in Dobretići municipality, Central Bosnia Canton, Bosnia and Herzegovina
