= Ranča =

Ranče
- Ranča Planina
- Location within Bosnia and Herzegovina

Highest point
- Peak: Vitorog
- Elevation: 1,478 m (4,849 ft)
- Coordinates: 44°24′35″N 17°22′00″E

Geography
- Location: Bosnia and Herzegovina

Ranča Planina locally known as Ranče is a mountain range in central Bosnia, in the municipality of Travnik, Dobretići and Jajce. The territory of Dobretići is almost entirely on the mountain (formerly with about 20 Croatian villages and hamlets).

== Geography ==
Under the northeastern slopes of Ranča flows Ugar, along which there is a narrow valley Pougarje. It is exposed to the steep slopes Korićani’s Rocks and of Ugarske stijene (Ugar’s Rocks), i.e. the mouths of Ilomska and Kobilja.

The main ridge is mild and has the character of a plateau, the highest peaks are :
From north to south :

- Ober or Hober (1230 m) in the north,
- Križ (1208 m),
- Gola Glavica (meaning Naked head, 1255 m),
- Suhi vrh (meaning Dry peak, 1430 m).

Further south, in the area of Kik the bare mountain peaks are :

- Zastijenje (1372 m)
- Vitorog (1478 m)
- Kik (1454 m)

== Flora and fauna ==
The Ranča is rich in mixed deciduous-coniferous forest communities, which are interspersed with mountain pastures. In the woods lives typical game for this type of biocenoses, among others: bear, wolf, fox, wild boar, badger, hedgehog et al.

== History ==
In 1893 construction of the narrow-gauge railway Turbe-Gostilj-Jasik-Kik above Zubovići began. It was in use until World War II.

== See also ==
- Dobretići
- Ugar
- Pougarje (valley)
- Komotin Fort
