= Petrovo Polje =

Petrovo Polje may refer to:

- Petrovo Polje, Croatia, a karst field in Dalmatia
- Petrovo Polje, Kneževo, a village in Kneževo Municipality, Republika Srpska
- Petrovo field, Bosnia and Herzegovina (Bosnian: Petrovo polje), a mountain plateau in Bosnia
- Petrovo Polje (Sjenica), a village in Sjenica Municipality, Serbia

== See also ==
- Petrovo (disambiguation)
