= Injići =

Village in Bosnia

- Village
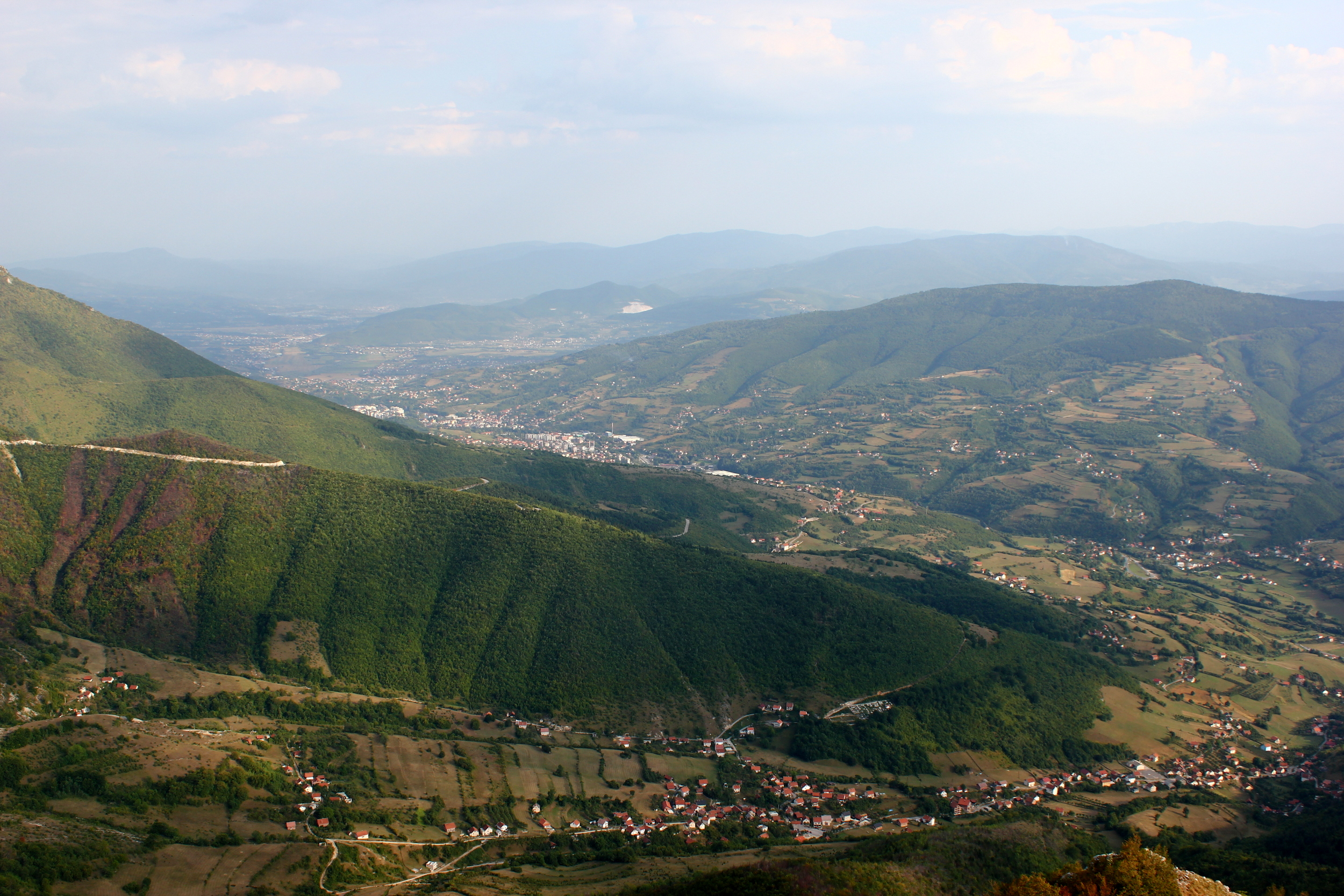

- Location within Bosnia and Herzegovina
- Coordinates: 44.2488°N 17.6114°E
- Country: Bosnia and Herzegovina
- Entity: Federation of Bosnia and Herzegovina
- Canton: Central Bosnia
- Municipality: Travnik
- Time zone: UTC+1 (CET)
  - Summer (DST): UTC+2 (CEST)

Injići (Cyrillic: ињици) is a village in the municipality of Travnik, Bosnia and Herzegovina.

Injići is located in-between Travnik and Turbe adjacent to Paklarevo.

The village was affected by the Bosnian War, in the middle of military activity. Injići was damaged in the Battle of Travnik and is currently under disrepair.
