= Peter Field =

Peter Field may refer to:

- Pen name of Davis Dresser (1904–1977), American mystery and western writer
- Pen name of W. Ryerson Johnson (1901–1995), American pulp fiction writer and editor
- Pen name of Laura Z. Hobson (1900–1986) and Thayer Hobson
- Peter Field, Portland-based songwriter for Henry Wolfe Gummer
- Peter Field, councillor for the City of Tea Tree Gully, South Australia
- Peter Field, founder of Risk (magazine)
- Peter Field, third husband of Trisha Noble, Australian singer and actress
- Peter Field, writer for the television show $40 a Day
- Peterfield, home of John Fell (judge)

== See also ==
- Port Hope (Peter's Field) Aerodrome, Ontario, Canada
- St Peter's Square, Manchester, formerly known as St. Peter's Field and the site of the 1819 Peterloo Massacre
- Petrovo polje (Bosnia) (Peter's Field in English)
