= Gornji Orašac =

- Village
- Location within Bosnia and Herzegovina
- Coordinates: 44.4168446°N 17.3821195°E
- Country: Bosnia and Herzegovina
- Entity: Federation of Bosnia and Herzegovina
- Canton: Central Bosnia
- Municipality: Dobretići

Area
  - Total: 1.07 sq mi (2.78 km^{2})

Population (2013)
  - Total: 45
  - Density: 42/sq mi (16/km^{2})
- Time zone: UTC+1 (CET)
  - Summer (DST): UTC+2 (CEST)

Gornji Orašac is a village in the municipality of Dobretići, Central Bosnia Canton, Bosnia and Herzegovina.

== Demographics ==
According to the 2013 census, its population was 45, all Croats.
