= Pljačkovac =

- Location within Bosnia and Herzegovina
- Native name: Пљачковац (Serbian)

Location
- Country: Bosnia and Herzegovina

Physical characteristics
- Source
  - location: Vlašić
- Mouth
  - location: Ugar
  - coordinates: 44.3328°N 17.5209°E
- Length: 4 km (2.5 mi)

Basin features
- Progression: Ugar→ Vrbas→ Sava→ Danube→ Black Sea

The Pljačkovac (Serbian Cyrillic: Пљачковац) is a short river in Central Bosnia, right tributary of Ugar, the largest right tributary of the Vrbas. Pljačkovac rises above the south Korićanian plateau at elevation of about 1360 m. In fact arises from two streams, one of which runs under Žežnička Greda (1477 m), and the other from the slopes of the hill Obadište (1466 m). They are connected at the end of Austro-Hungarian road and swing to pull forest goods. Now is the crossroads of four local road leading to Korićani (the north side) and Pougarje or village Sažići, Babanovac, Mudrike and Vitovlje (in the south).

Except several small creeks on both sides, there are no major tributaries. In the 1960s, on the Pljačkovcu there were three watermills.
