= Petrovo =

Petrovo, Petrovo Selo is a Slavic toponym. The word Petrovo means Peter's. It can refer to:

== Places ==
=== Bosnia and Herzegovina ===
- Petrovo, Bosnia and Herzegovina, or Bosansko Petrovo Selo, a town and municipality in Republika Srpska
- Petrovo Selo, Gradiška, a village in Gradiška Municipality, Republika Srpska

=== Serbia ===
- Bačko Petrovo Selo, a village in Bečej Municipality
- Petrovo Selo (Kladovo), a village in Kladovo Municipality

=== Croatia ===
- Baranjsko Petrovo Selo, a village in Osijek-Baranja County
- Staro Petrovo Selo, a village and municipality in Brod-Posavina County
- Ličko Petrovo Selo, a village in the Lika-Senj County
- Petrovo Selo (Dubrovnik), a village in the Dubrovnik-Neretva County

=== Other countries ===
- Petrovo, Gevgelija, a village in North Macedonia
- Petrovo-Dalneye, a village in Russia
- Petrovo, Bulgaria, one of three villages of that name in Bulgaria, a.o. Petrovo, Blagoevgrad Province
- Petrovo, Rožňava District, a village and municipality in the Rožňava District, Slovakia

== See also ==
- Petrovo Polje (disambiguation)
- Petrovo Vrelo, a village and spring (Vrelo) in Glamoč municipality, Bosnia and Herzegovina
- Petrovo Brdo, a village in Slovenia
- Petrove, a town in Central Ukraine
