= Kričići-Jejići =

- Village
- Location within Bosnia and Herzegovina
- Coordinates: 44.3972388°N 17.4269616°E
- Country: Bosnia and Herzegovina
- Entity: Federation of Bosnia and Herzegovina
- Canton: Central Bosnia
- Municipality: Dobretići

Area
  - Total: 2.13 sq mi (5.52 km^{2})

Population (2013)
  - Total: 37
  - Density: 17/sq mi (6.7/km^{2})
- Time zone: UTC+1 (CET)
  - Summer (DST): UTC+2 (CEST)

Kričići-Jejići is a village in the municipality of Dobretići, Central Bosnia Canton, Bosnia and Herzegovina.

== Demographics ==
According to the 2013 census, its population was 37, all Croats.
