= Nes radio =

Nes Radio
Banja Luka; Bosnia and Herzegovina
- Broadcast area: Bosnia and Herzegovina
- Frequencies: Sarajevo 87.7 MHz; Banja Luka 88.4 MHz; Kneževo 89.7 MHz; Tešanj 95.5 MHz; Velika Kladuša 99.3 MHz; Banja Luka 106.4 MHz

Programming
- Language: Serbian language
- Format: Contemporary hit radio, entertainment, talk, news

Ownership
- Owner: Nezavisne novine
- Sister stations: Nes Castra

History
- First air date: 1 June 1997
- Call sign meaning: NES RADIO

Technical information
- Transmitter coordinates: 44°46′N 17°11′E

Links
- Website: www.nesradio.com

Nes Radio is a Bosnian commercial radio station, broadcasting from Banja Luka. Radio was founded by Nezavisne novine publishing house and newspapers on 1 June 1997.

Nes Radio's sister station intended for the local audience in Banja Luka is radio Nes Castra.

== Frequencies ==
The program is currently broadcast at 6 frequencies in 5 Bosnian cities:

- Sarajevo 87.7 MHz
- Banja Luka 88.4 MHz
- Banja Luka 106.4 MHz
- Kneževo, Bosnia and Herzegovina 89.7 MHz
- Tešanj 95.5 MHz
- Velika Kladuša 99.3 MHz

== See also ==
- List of radio stations in Bosnia and Herzegovina
