= Bunar, Dobretići =

Bunar
- Village
- Location within Bosnia and Herzegovina
- Coordinates: 44.3937428°N 17.3988062°E
- Country: Bosnia and Herzegovina
- Entity: Federation of Bosnia and Herzegovina
- Canton: Central Bosnia
- Municipality: Dobretići

Area
  - Total: 0.58 sq mi (1.49 km^{2})

Population (2013)
  - Total: 56
  - Density: 97/sq mi (38/km^{2})
- Time zone: UTC+1 (CET)
  - Summer (DST): UTC+2 (CEST)

Bunar is a village in the municipality of Dobretići, Central Bosnia Canton, Bosnia and Herzegovina.

== Demographics ==
According to the 2013 census, its population was 56.

Ethnicity in 2013
Ethnicity	Number	Percentage
Croats	55	98.2%
other/undeclared	1	1.8%
Total	56	100%
