= Devetero vrela =

- Location within Bosnia and Herzegovina

Location
- Country: Bosnia and Herzegovina

Physical characteristics
- Mouth
  - location: Ilomska
  - coordinates: 44°21′39″N 17°36′04″E
- Length: ~500 m

Basin features
- Progression: Ilomska→ Ugar→ Vrbas→ Sava→ Danube→ Black Sea

Devetero vrela (English Nine Sources) is a short right tributary of the Ilomska river, below Petrovo Polje. Although only a few hundred meters long, it is very rich in water, with lots of small streams flowing into it, especially springs.

This body of water is named after the nine sources at the same place, although it is difficult to confirm visually.
