= Korićani Cliffs massacre =

1992 mass killing during the Bosnian War

- Part of the Bosnian War
- Mount Vlašić (Bosnia and Herzegovina)
- Location: 44°17′00″N 17°40′00″E; Mount Vlašić, Republic of Bosnia and Herzegovina
- Date: 21 August 1992 (Central European Time)
- Target: Bosniaks, Croats and other non-Serb civilians
- Attack type: Mass killing
- Deaths: 224
- Perpetrator: Bosnian Serb police unit "Red Berets"
- Motive: Ethnic cleansing of non-Serb population

The Korićani Cliffs massacre was the mass murder of more than 200 Bosniak and Bosnian Croat men on 21 August 1992, during the Bosnian War, at the Korićani Cliffs on Mount Vlašić in central Bosnia and Herzegovina. The victims, former detainees from the Bosnian Serb-run concentration camp at Trnopolje, were separated out from a larger group of civilians being taken to Republic of Bosnia and Herzegovina-controlled territory in central Bosnia. The massacre was carried out by members of the special response team of the Public Security Center (CJB) of Prijedor, a Bosnian Serb reserve police unit. The massacre was investigated and the names of the victims were reported in a series of articles published by the Bosnian Serb newspaper Nezavisne novine. In 1999 the newspaper's editor Željko Kopanja, who had worked on the story, was maimed in a bombing attempt on his life.

In trials at the International Criminal Tribunal for the former Yugoslavia (ICTY) and the Court of Bosnia and Herzegovina members of the group who carried out the killings, including their leader, Darko Mrđa, were convicted and sentenced to various terms of imprisonment. In the final major trial at the Court of Bosnia and Herzegovina, on 21 December 2010 Zoran Babić, Milorad Škrbić, Dušan Janković and Željko Stojnić, all employed at the Public Security Center in Prijedor during the war, were found guilty and between them sentenced to decades in prison for war crimes committed against more than 200 Bosniak and Croat civilians in the Korićani Cliffs massacre. The suspected chief organizer of the massacre, Simo Drljača, the chief of police at Prijedor, was shot dead during an attempt to arrest him.

The victims were among more than 3,500 non-Serbs killed during the ethnic cleansing campaign in the Prijedor area in 1992. The unit behind the Korićani Cliffs massacre was alleged to have committed many other crimes in the area, including some against local Serbs. After a systematic investigation of the site in 2009 most of the victims remained yet to be recovered. In 2017, a new round of forensics and exhumation were performed. By 2019, 181 victims were identified. On July 21, 2019, a funeral ceremony took place and 86 victims were reburied in presence of their families.

== The massacre ==
On 21 August 1992, a large group of about 1,200 civilian detainees released from the Bosnian Serb-run Trnopolje camp were being transported to Republic of Bosnia and Herzegovina-controlled territory in central Bosnia. After the convoy reached Mount Vlašić, about 200–250 men were selected and separated from the main group by a group of paramilitary policemen from Prijedor, the so-called "Intervention Squad", also known as "Mice" and "Red Berets", and crammed onto two buses. According to the survivor Medo Sivac (18 years old at the time), when the rest of the convoy left for Travnik, "they took everything valuable from us, jewelry, money, watches." The separated men were told they were going to be exchanged for prisoners held by the Bosnian government forces, but instead they were taken on a 15-minute journey to the edge of a ravine at Korićani Cliffs.

When the buses arrived at the cliffs, the prisoners on the first bus were taken off and killed one-by-one by being shot while kneeling at the edge of the ravine. After about half the men had been taken off the bus, the rest were taken to be executed in groups of three. Before leaving, the police officers also fired down on the bodies and threw hand grenades at them. Sivac, who was on the second bus, reported how all the passengers from that bus were unloaded together and were then ordered to line up along the cliffs and kneel there:

"Then the horrible shooting started. I was falling into the abyss. I didn’t lose consciousness, but suddenly I felt that the fall was over, because of the bushes attached to the cliff. I took refuge there, going as far as possible into the bush during the night. In the morning I stepped down somehow to find refuge in the nearby forest. I heard when some people came to burn the corpses."

Twelve of the victims survived the shootings and the fall into the ravine. Seven of them were found by members of the Army of the Republika Srpska (VRS), who filed a report on the "terrible crime against civilians," but the prisoners were not immediately released and some suffered further abuse while being treated for their wounds at the Hospital for Eye Diseases in Paprikovac. They were eventually handed over to the ICRC on 1 October.

== Initial Bosnian Serb investigation ==
Appearing as a prosecution witness at the trial of members of the unit in 2009, Jefto Jankovic, former investigative judge with the Basic Court in Banja Luka, told how on 23 August 1992, after receiving a call from the Public Safety Station in Banja Luka, he went to Korićanske Stijene to conduct a crime-scene inspection: "We arrived there at about 3 pm We saw that the area was rocky, the canyon was about 100 to 300 meters deep. I saw two piles of corpses at the bottom of the canyon. The corpses were lying there one on top of the other. It was a frightening scene. It was something I had never seen in my life. As it was impossible to approach them, I asked our crime technician to record it using a video camcorder. This is all that we did during the course of the crime-scene inspection."

Janković was then taken to the Staff Headquarters of the VRS 22nd Brigade in Kneževo, where he spoke to two survivors, Medo Sivac and Midhat Mujkanović, who told him how they had managed to survive by jumping down when the shooting started. He drove them personally to Banja Luka and later on they were transferred to the Islamic Humanitarian Association Merhamet. Jankovic said that because of the large number of victims he referred the case to the Public Safety Station in Banja Luka for further investigation and claimed that he did not know any further details concerning the perpetrators or victims.

== Nezavisne Novine investigation ==
The Serbian newspaper Nezavisne novine, led by editor Željko Kopanja, sought to draw attention to war crimes committed during the Bosnian war and to bring those responsible for the Koricani massacre to justice. In the late 1990s, it published a series of reports detailing the Koricani shooting and the inaction of the authorities to find the killers, as well as the concealment of evidence and an incomplete examination of the crime scene.

Nezavisne novine was able to establish that many of the bodies had been doused with acid after the shooting and that at least 12 corpses had been burned. At least two forensic experts from Banja Luka, Aleksandar Vodovnik and Slavisa Duric, examined the bodies in the ravine on 14 September 1992, and were referred to them by the assistant district attorney, Marinko Kovacevic. The investigation was supervised by Žefto Janković, the investigating judge of the Banja Luka District Court. The bodies of many of the victims were left with documents and identity cards, which were eventually attached to the case file. Nezavisne Novine learned that the prosecutor's office had sent a request to the Interior Ministry for an investigation at least twice, but local authorities in Banja Luka sabotaged it. The case wasn’t closed and was later referred to the International Criminal Tribunal for the former Yugoslavia.

Kopanja believed that the entire Serbian people could not and should not bear the burden of responsibility and guilt for the crimes of individuals, and that the murderers must be identified and punished. He was also convinced that these execution teams were not self-organised, but had quite specific leadership.

Shortly after the articles were published, an assassination attempt was made on Kopanja by planting a bomb in his car. On the morning of 22 October 1999, Kopania got into his car and started the engine, which set off the explosive device. Kopanja's leg was blown off and he suffered a clinical death while in hospital. Having survived by a miracle, he was left disabled for life. The assassination attempt was never solved but investigators linked it directly to Kopanja's journalistic work and specifically to the Koricani massacre investigation. Members of the Serbian Radical Party of Republika Srpska, dissatisfied with his journalistic work, were among the main suspects.

== Arrests and trials ==
The leader of the group that carried out the killings, Darko Mrđa, was arrested by SFOR in 2002 and tried by ICTY. In 2004 he was convicted on two counts of crimes against humanity (extermination and inhumane acts) and one count of violations of the laws or customs of war (murder) and sentenced to 17 years in prison. Mrđa is believed to have been ordered to commit the crime by Simo Drljača, the chief of police of Prijedor, who was shot and killed by SFOR soldiers while resisting an attempt to arrest him in 1997.

In May 2009, eight former members of the Public Safety Station in Prijedor and the Emergency Police Squad charged with crimes committed at Korićanske Stijene were brought to trial before the Court of Bosnia and Herzegovina. Damir Ivanković, Zoran Babić, Gordan Đurić, Milorad Radaković, Milorad Škrbić, Ljubiša Četić, Dušan Janković and Željko Stojnić were charged with crimes against humanity, as the Prosecution charged them with having participated in organizing and escorting the convoy of Croat and Bosniak civilians who were supposed to be exchanged on 21 August 1992, from which about 200 men had been separated before being shot with automatic weapons at Korićani Cliffs.

Following exhumations at the ravine in August 2009, two more former members of the Intervention Squad and a Territorial Defense unit, Branko Topola (a serving police officer) and Petar Čivčić, were also arrested on suspicion of taking part in the massacre.

On 21 December 2010 the Court of Bosnia and Herzegovina's first instance verdict pronounced Zoran Babić, Milorad Škrbić, Dušan Janković and Željko Stojnić guilty of participating in a joint criminal enterprise in Prijedor municipality conducted with the aim of persecuting, robbing and killing non-Serb civilians during the course of 1992. Babić and Škrbić were sentenced to 22 years' imprisonment and Stojnic to 15 years in prison for the murder of more than 150 male civilians committed at Koricanske stijene on 21 August 1992. All were former members of the Interventions Squad at the Public Safety Station in Prijedor. The former Commander of the Public Safety Station, Dušan Janković, was found guilty of having ordered the murders and sentenced to 27 years in prison. Milorad Radaković was acquitted of all charges because it was found that he had participated in the convoy as a medical worker, had not been part of the plan to separate and kill the victims and because he had remained on the bus could not have taken part in the executions. The sentences were influenced by Babić's "severe health condition", testimony that Škrbić had "protected some civilians in the bus he escorted" and Stojnic's age (as he was under 21 years old he could not be sentenced to long-term imprisonment. Three other accused had previously admitted their guilt. Damir Ivanković who agreed to testify against the other indictees; was sentenced to 14 years imprisonment. Gordan Đurić who had testified that he had not wanted to participate in the shooting of civilians and had sheltered behind a cliff but did obey orders to stand guard securing the location where the executions took place was sentenced to eight years imprisonment. Ljubiša Četić also admitted his guilt and was sentenced to 13 years in prison. Dušan Janković, who had been released from prison under restrictive conditions in November 2009, failed to attend the hearing. When he failed to appear his attorney Ranko Dakić told the Court he been informed that "the car broke down". The State Court ordered Janković's arrest as a fugitive from justice.

The families of the victims and survivors at Koricani found the sentences inconsistent with the gravity of the crime: they said the killers in the firing squad received a total of 200 years' imprisonment for all, meaning that the court gave each of them a year in prison for one person killed.

== Location of the remains ==
Although some remains were located by experts in 2003 thanks to testimony from survivors and a confession by Damir Ivankovic, until 2009 the whereabouts of most of the victims remained unknown. The bodies were thought probably to have been buried in mass graves in various locations of Bosnia and Herzegovina.

After no serious investigation to locate the missing persons or bodies was undertaken by the authorities, in September 2008 the Advocacy Center – TRIAL (ACT) Project lodged six individual applications before the European Court of Human Rights in relation to the disappearance of eight Bosniak men during the massacre at Mount Vlasic, on behalf of their relatives.

In July/August 2009 the Bosnian Institute for Missing Persons (IMP) investigated a mass grave site at the Korićani Cliffs. By the end of August 2009, the remains of at least 60 individuals had been exhumed from the deep ravine. As it turned out, some of the bodies were burned and others had been moved in order to hide the traces of the crime. According to Amor Mašović of the IMP, these were the dead from one of the buses.

In December 2010 the Bosnian Institute for Missing Persons said an additional search will be carried out as it is believed another mass grave could exist at the Korićani Cliffs.

In 2017, new round of searches started at the Korićani Cliffs. By October of the same year, Bosnia’s Institute for Missing Persons confirmed exhumation of the remains of 137 people. As of 2019, 181 victims were identified.

On July 21, 2019, a funeral ceremony was held near Prijedor and the remains of 86 victims were buried.

== Remembrance ==
Every year memorials are held on the anniversary of the shooting at the Koricani Cliffs on Mount Vlasic.

Most of the survivors left the country and live abroad, avoiding any contacts with the media for personal safety reasons.

== In popular culture ==
An account of the massacre was portrayed in a journalistic comic book Safe Area Goražde.

== Sources ==
- "Tracking Down The Crimes At Koricani Near Knezevo In August 1992" (PDF). Nezavisne Novine. 25 August 1999.
- Jogunčić, Anes; Salihbegović, Adis; Dervišević, Emina; Sarajlić, Nermin (17 June 2019). "Challenges associated with investigating a mass grave at the Korićani cliffs in central Bosnia". Forensic Leg Med. 66: 107–112. doi:10.1016/j.jflm.2019.04.013. PMID 31254968. S2CID 195760992.
- Kurspahić, Kemal (2003). Prime Time Crime: Balkan Media in War and Peace. New York: US Institute of Peace Press. p. 160. ISBN 978-1-929223-39-8.
