= Milaševci =

- Village
- Location within Bosnia and Herzegovina
- Coordinates: 44.4407742°N 17.3570351°E
- Country: Bosnia and Herzegovina
- Entity: Federation of Bosnia and Herzegovina
- Canton: Central Bosnia
- Municipality: Dobretići

Area
  - Total: 3.70 sq mi (9.58 km^{2})

Population (2013)
  - Total: 127
  - Density: 34.3/sq mi (13.3/km^{2})
- Time zone: UTC+1 (CET)
  - Summer (DST): UTC+2 (CEST)

Milaševci is a village in the municipality of Dobretići, Central Bosnia Canton, Bosnia and Herzegovina.

== Demographics ==
According to the 2013 census, its population was 127.

Ethnicity in 2013
Ethnicity	Number	Percentage
Croats	126	99.2%
other/undeclared	1	0.8%
Total	127	100%
