= Nes Castra =

Banja Luka; Bosnia and Herzegovina
- Broadcast area: Bosnia and Herzegovina
- Frequency: Banja Luka 97.6 MHz

Programming
- Language: Serbian language
- Format: Defunct (was Contemporary hit radio, entertainment, talk, news)

Ownership
- Owner: Nezavisne novine
- Sister stations: Nes radio

History
- First air date: September 2007
- Call sign meaning: NES CASTRA

Technical information
- Transmitter coordinates: 44°46′N 17°11′E

Nes Castra was a Bosnian commercial radio station, broadcasting from Banja Luka from 2007 until 23 July 2018.

Formatted as Urban radio, Nes Castra it was intended for the local audience in Banja Luka at single frequency 97.6 MHz. Its sister station was Nes radio.

== See also ==
- List of radio stations in Bosnia and Herzegovina
