= Mameledžija =

Mameledžija is a Bosnian surname. Notable people with the surname include:

- Enes Mameledžija (born 1949), Bosnian footballer
- Nihad Mameledžija (born 1971), Bosnian bobsledder
