= Petrovo Polje (Bosnia and Herzegovina) =

- Петрово Поље
- Location within Bosnia and Herzegovina
- Floor elevation: 1,140 to 1,220 metres (3,740 to 4,000 ft)
- Long-axis direction: ESE-WNW

Naming
- English translation: Petrovo field

Geology
- Type: field part of Podvlašić plateau

Geography
- Country: Bosnia and Herzegovina
- Population center: Petrovo Polje
- Borders on: Vlašić; Mala Ilomska; Vrbanja river; Ilomska
- Coordinates: 44°24′06″N 17°33′37″E
- River: Ugar

Location
- Interactive map of Petrovo Polje

Petrovo field (Serbo-Croatian: Petrovo polje, Петрово поље, transl. Peter's Field) is a small field on Podvlašić plateau, as part of Vlašić mountain group, and it's positioned at an altitude of about 1140 meters to 1220 meters a.s.l.

On the plateau there is the eponymous village, Petrovo Polje, with several hamlets, including registered Đurđevina, Nikodinovići (east) and Petrovo Polje village in narrower sense, once the center of the local community. It stretches from Đurđevina (elevation 1243 m), with the Mala Ilomska (Small Ilomska) (east) to the proximity intersection of paved local roads of this village crossroad to Kneževo, Turbe and Imljani (west). To the north is bounded by a line beginning a steep slope into the valley of Vrbanja river, on the line of the peaks 1220 – 1140 m, and on south − Ilomska valley. Ravne nadbojine (Straight nadbojine) is the protruding part of the plateau towards Ilomska, with Nikodinovići. On the plateau there are a dozen permanent sources of drinking water, including the famous Kaursko vrelo (Kaursko spring) and Bijeljina. To Peter's Field is part of the watershed between the basins of the Vrbanja and Ugar. In Vrbanja flow Čudnić, Kovaćevića potok (stream) and Ćorkovac, and Ilomska (confluence of Ugar) - Mala Ilomska (Small Ilomska) and Devetero vrela (Nine springs).
