= Paklarevo =

- Village
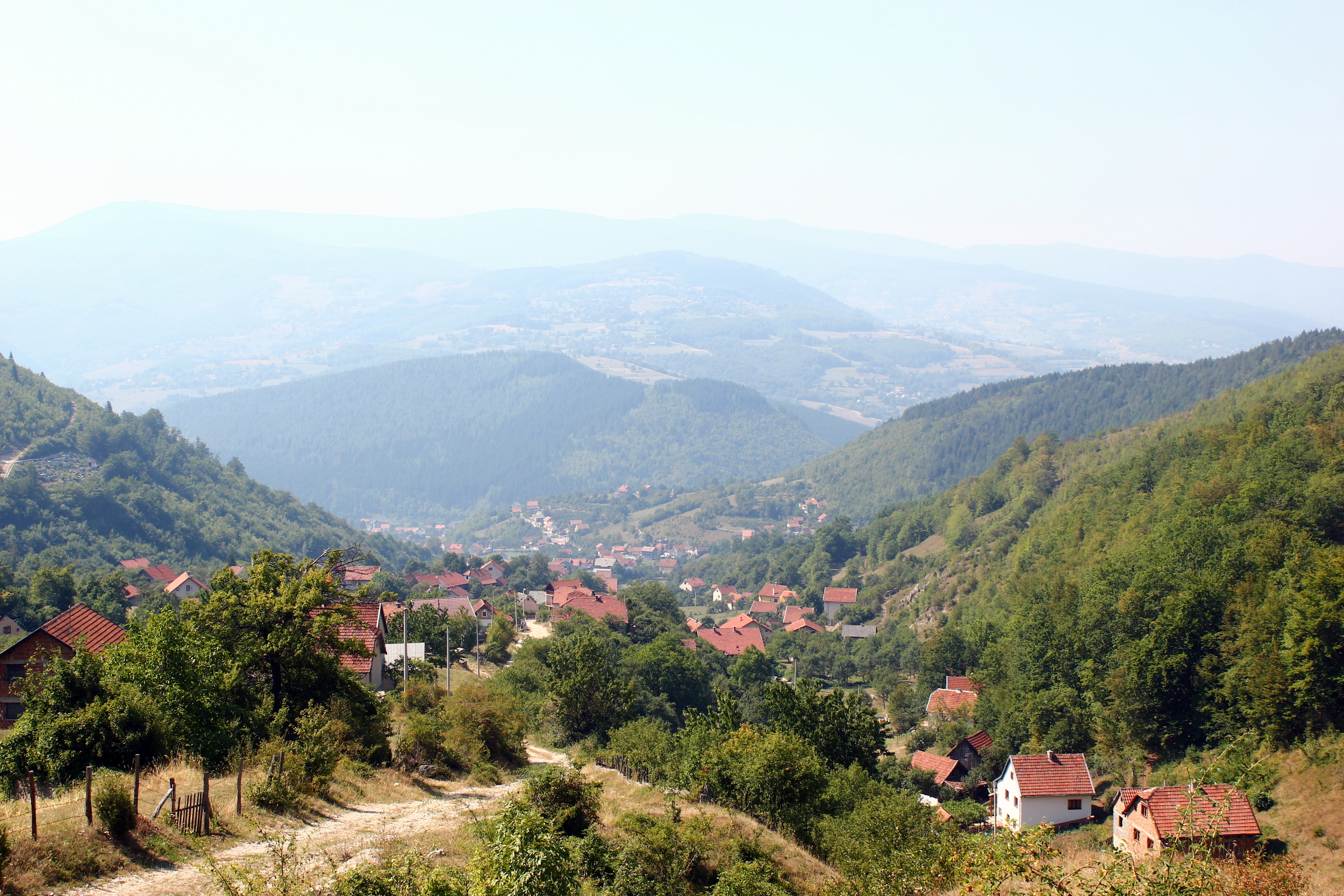

- Location within Bosnia and Herzegovina
- Coordinates: 44.2475892°N 17.5928978°E
- Country: Bosnia and Herzegovina
- Entity: Federation of Bosnia and Herzegovina
- Canton: Central Bosnia
- Municipality: Travnik

Area
  - Total: 15.87 sq mi (41.11 km^{2})

Population (2013)
  - Total: 975
  - Density: 61.4/sq mi (23.7/km^{2})
- Time zone: UTC+1 (CET)
  - Summer (DST): UTC+2 (CEST)

Paklarevo is a village in the municipality of Travnik, Bosnia and Herzegovina.

It is located close to the Vlašić mountain.

== Demographics ==
According to the 2013 census, its population was 975.

Ethnicity in 2013
Ethnicity	Number	Percentage
Croats	972	99.7%
Serbs	2	0.2%
other/undeclared	1	0.1%
Total	975	100%
