= Željko Kopanja =

Bosnian journalist (1954–2016)

- Born: 21 October 1954; Kotor Varoš, PR Bosnia and Herzegovina, Yugoslavia
- Died: 8 August 2016 (aged 61); Banja Luka, Bosnia and Herzegovina
- Occupation: Journalist
- Organization: Nezavisne Novine
- Known for: 1999 car bomb attack
- Awards: CPJ International Press Freedom Awards (2000); Hellman-Hammett grant (2000)

Željko Kopanja (Serbian: Жељко Копања; 21 October 1954 – 8 August 2016) was a Bosnian newspaper editor and director of the newspaper Nezavisne Novine. The Christian Science Monitor described him as an equal critic of all parties without regard to ethnicity and "probably the most feared journalist in Bosnia and Herzegovina." On August 8, 2016 Željko Kopanja died from a cardiac arrest.

In October 1999, he lost both legs in a car bomb attack.

== Early career ==
Kopanja was born in Kotor Varoš, Bosnia and Herzegovina in 1954. He held a degree in economics from University of Banja Luka. He also was a professional player of association football. He began his journalist career with the Banja Luka's daily newspaper Glas before the Bosnian War and then reported about criminal doings of Republika Srpska during the war for Belgrade's weekly newspaper Telegraf.

In 1995, shortly after the Dayton Agreement which ended the Bosnian War, Kopanja co-founded Nezavisne Novine, a weekly independent newspaper, in order to "foster improved relationships among Serbs, Muslims and Croats in Bosnia". The magazine was funded in part by the United States Agency for International Development, per a part of the Dayton Agreement which had called for funding for non-nationalist media. Beginning with a circulation of 4,000, the newspaper later became a daily, and its circulation climbed to 18,000 in the next five years.

In August 1999, Nezavisne Novine broke new ground by leading its own investigation and reporting on the murder of 200 Muslim civilians by Serbian police officers in 1992 during the Korićani Cliffs massacre. With the report, the paper became the first Serb paper in Republic of Srpska to report on incidents by Serbs during the Yugoslav Wars. At the same time, he stated that he "stands by the thesis that no nation is genocidal or criminal, but individuals from certain nations are. I think that the Serbian people do not deserve to carry this burden ... I do not allow anyone to commit war crimes in my name or in the name of my people, nor does anyone have the right to do that."

== Assassination attempt ==
Following Kopanja's reporting on atrocities committed by Bosnian Serbs, he was denounced by some groups as a traitor, and began to receive death threats. On October 22, 1999, he was nearly killed by a car bomb that exploded as he turned the ignition key. A nearby hospital amputated both of his legs. International supporters funded follow-up medical care for him in Austria, as well as high-quality prosthetic legs.

The bombing provoked outrage in both Muslim and Serbian media. Srpski Glas joined Nezavisne Novine in printing a mostly blank front page three days after the bombing, carrying only the words "We Want to Know" to call for further investigation into the attack. Muslim television interrupted programming to display the same message.

The perpetrators were not found, though Kopanja later stated his belief that Serbian security forces were responsible for the attack in retaliation for his reporting on war crimes. An investigation by the US Federal Bureau of Investigation supported his contention.

Kopanja continued to edit and write for Nezavisne Novine despite the attack.

== Awards ==
In November 2000, Kopanja was awarded the International Press Freedom Award of the US-based Committee to Protect Journalists, which recognizes journalists who show courage in defending press freedom despite facing attacks, threats, or imprisonment.

In the same year, Human Rights Watch awarded him one of its Hellman/Hammett grants, which recognize "writers around the world who have been targets of political persecution and are in financial need".

After his death, Nezavisne Novine established a prize in his honour.

== Personal life ==
Kopanja's widow is Croatian. He died on 8 August 2016 in Banja Luka, Bosnia and Herzegovina.

== Literature ==
- Kurspahić, Kemal (2003). Prime Time Crime: Balkan Media in War and Peace. New York. p. 160. ISBN 9781929223398.
