= Kopaonik (Raška) =

Kopaonik Копаоник
- Village (Selo)
- Location within Serbia
- Coordinates: 43°16′21″N 20°46′34″E
- Country: Serbia
- District: Raška District
- Municipality: Raška

Area
  - Total: 25.95 km^{2} (10.02 sq mi)

Population (2011)
  - Total: 19
  - Density: 0.73/km^{2} (1.9/sq mi)
- Time zone: UTC+1 (CET)
  - Summer (DST): UTC+2 (CEST)
- Postal code: 36354

Kopaonik (Serbian: Копаоник) is a village located in the municipality of Raška, Serbia. According to the 2011 census, the village has a population of 19 inhabitants.
