= Melina, Banja Luka =

Melina Мелина (Serbian)
- Village (Selo)
- Location within Bosnia and Herzegovina
- Coordinates: 44°22′N 17°28′E
- Country: Bosnia and Herzegovina
- Entity: Republika Srpska
- Municipality: Banja Luka

Population (2013)
  - Total: 827
- Time zone: UTC+1 (CET)
  - Summer (DST): UTC+2 (CEST)

Melina (Serbian Cyrillic: Мелина) is a village in the municipality of Banja Luka, Republika Srpska, Bosnia and Herzegovina.
