= Enes Mameledžija =

Bosnian footballer (born 1949)

Personal information
- Date of birth: August 16, 1949 (age 76)
- Place of birth: Turbe, Travnik, SFR Yugoslavia
- Position: Forward

Senior career*
Years	Team	Apps	(Gls)
–	Iskra Bugojno		
1976	Sète	5	(3)
1976–1978	Arles	23	(10)
1978	Chicago Sting	6	(0)
- * Club domestic league appearances and goals

Enes Mameledžija (born 16 August 1949) is a Bosnian former professional footballer.

== Career ==
He played his football in Yugoslavia for Iskra Bugojno then was traded FC Sète of France. He went on to play for Athlétic Club Arlésien (AC Arles). He was later traded to the Chicago Sting of the NASL.
