= Petrovo, Rožňava District =

Petrovo Pétermány
- Municipality
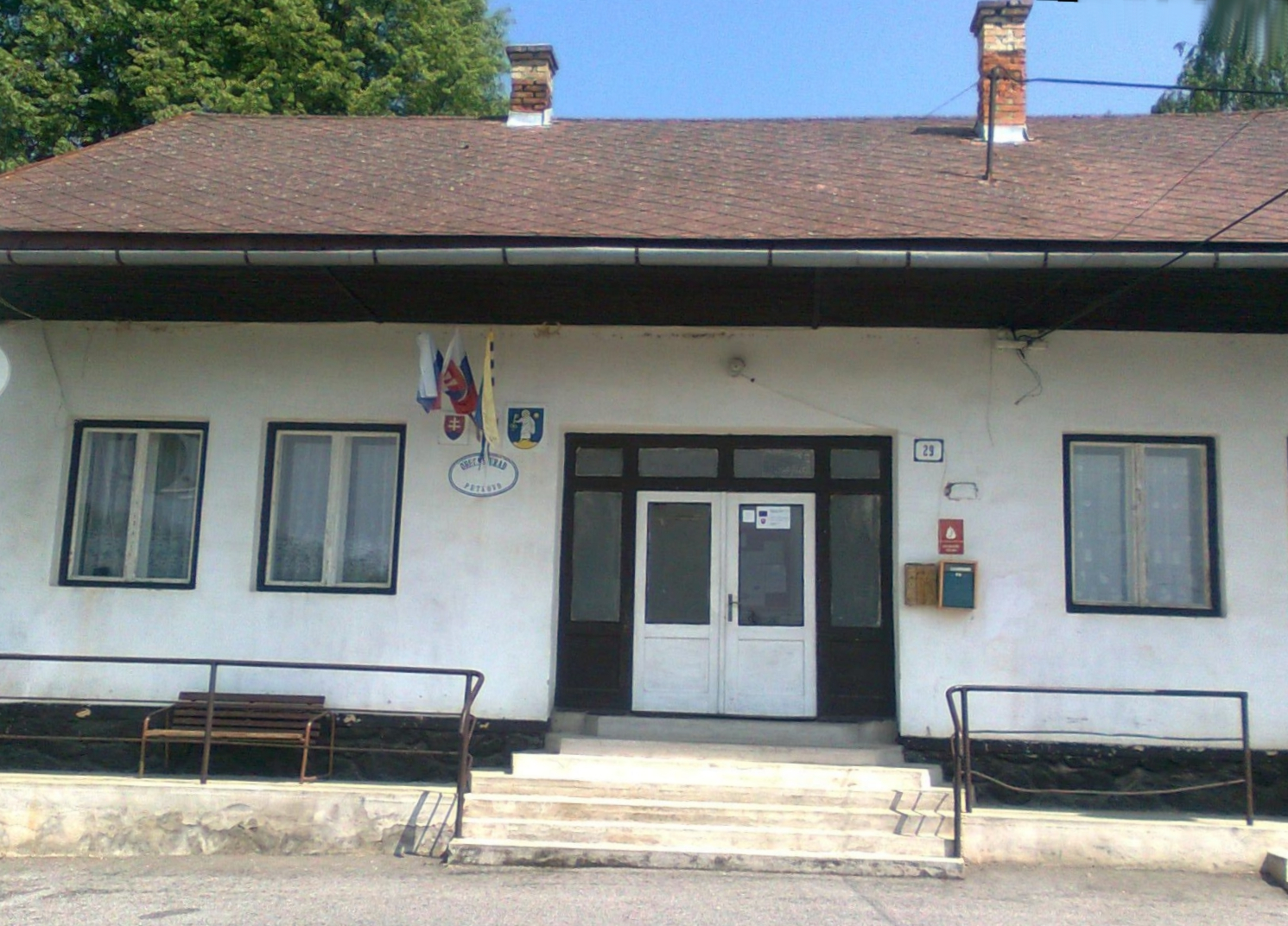

- Flag

- Location of Petrovo in the Košice Region Location of Petrovo in Slovakia
- Coordinates: 48.72°N 20.37°E
- Country: Slovakia
- Region: Košice Region
- District: Rožňava District
- First mentioned: 1320

Area
  - Total: 3.96 km^{2} (1.53 sq mi)
- Elevation: 386 m (1,266 ft)

Population (2025)
  - Total: 96
- Time zone: UTC+1 (CET)
  - Summer (DST): UTC+2 (CEST)
- Postal code: 493 5
- Area code: +421 58
- Vehicle registration plate (until 2022): RV
- Website: www.obecpetrovo.sk

Petrovo (Hungarian: Pétermány) is a village and municipality in the Rožňava District in the Košice Region of middle-eastern Slovakia.

== History ==
In historical records the village was first mentioned in 1320. Before the establishment of independent Czechoslovakia in 1918, Petrovo was part of Gömör and Kishont County within the Kingdom of Hungary. From 1939 to 1945, it was part of the Slovak Republic.

== Geography ==
The municipality lies at an altitude of 386 metres (1,266 ft) and covers an area of 3.96 km^{2} (1.53 sq mi) (2025).

== Population ==
Population statistic (10 years)
Year	1995	2005	2015	2025
Count	119	108	110	96
Difference		−9.24%	+1.85%	−12.72%

Population statistic
Year	2024	2025
Count	95	96
Difference		+1.05%

It has a population of 96 people (31 December 2025).

=== Ethnicity ===
Census 2021 (1+ %)
Ethnicity	Number	Fraction
Slovak	101	96.19%
Romani	4	3.8%
Not found out	2	1.9%
Total	105	

In year 2021 was 105 people by ethnicity 101 as Slovak, 4 as Romani, 2 as Not found out, 1 as Czech, 1 as Serbian and 1 as Hungarian.

Note on population: The difference values of population numbers in the table "Population statistic" and in the sections "Ethnicity" & "Religion" is caused by the use of various statistical methods.

=== Religion ===
Census 2021 (1+ %)
Religion	Number	Fraction
None	69	65.71%
Evangelical Church	25	23.81%
Roman Catholic Church	8	7.62%
Not found out	2	1.9%
Total	105	

In year 2021 was 105 people by religion 69 from None, 25 from Evangelical Church, 8 from Roman Catholic Church, 2 from Not found out and 1 from Greek Catholic Church.

== Culture ==
The village has a public library.
