= Vitovlje Malo =

- Village
- Etymology: Little Vitovlje
- Location within Bosnia and Herzegovina
- Coordinates: 44.3492°N 17.4575°E
- Country: Bosnia and Herzegovina
- Entity: Federation of Bosnia and Herzegovina
- Canton: Central Bosnia
- Municipality: Dobretići

Area
  - Total: 2.53 sq mi (6.56 km^{2})
- Elevation: 3,638 ft (1,109 m)

Population (2013)
  - Total: 163
  - Density: 64.4/sq mi (24.8/km^{2})
- Time zone: UTC+1 (CET)
  - Summer (DST): UTC+2 (CEST)
- Area code: +387 30

Vitovlje Malo is a village in the municipality of Dobretići, Central Bosnia Canton, Bosnia and Herzegovina.

== History ==
Vitovlje Malo was in Skender Vakuf municipality in the former Yugoslavia. Under the 1995 Dayton Agreement ending the Bosnian War of 1992–1995, Bosnia and Herzegovina was divided into two political entities: the Federation of Bosnia and Herzegovina and Republika Srpska. Skender Vakuf (by then renamed Kneževo) became part of the latter, and Vitovlje Malo of the former. Vitovlje Malo was transferred to the new municipality of Dobretići in the Federation of Bosnia and Herzegovina.

== Demographics ==
Population data from official censuses are:

Year	Bosniaks	Croats	Serbs	Others	Total	Source
1971		148		1	149	
1981	11	249	1		261	
1991		203			203	
2013		162	1		163	
