= Korićani =

Korićani Корићани
- Village
- Location in Bosnia and Herzegovina
- Coordinates: 44.352776°N 17.547270°E
- Country: Bosnia and Herzegovina
- Entity: Federacija Bosne i Hercegovine
- Municipality: Travnik
- Highest elevation: 1,280 m (4,200 ft)
- Lowest elevation: 1,260 m (4,130 ft)

Population (1991)
  - Total: 755
- Area code: +387 (030)

Korićani (Serbian Cyrillic: Корићани) is a village in central Bosnia and Herzegovina. Before the War in Bosnia, Korićani was the (administrative) united village. The Dayton Agreement is divided this settlement into two entities. Upper Korićani is today in the Federation of Bosnia and Herzegovina, and Lower Korićani in the Republic of Srpska.

== Geography ==
Korićani is located on the slopes of the Vlašić mountain, in the corner of the plateau between Ugar and Ilomska. In fact, it is enclosed between two parts of Korićanske stijene: canyon Ilomska and Pougarje. The rocks are bent at almost a right angle, which closed Ugar and Ilomska. It extends to an altitude of 1,050–1,200 meters. The road at the entrance to Korićani plateau

== History ==
In Mediaeval Bosnia, in their present territory mentioned city Oštrec and some other old towers.

During World War II in Korićani were a partisan stronghold, especially after the fall of Italy (1943). The Korićani were briefly placed patients Central Divisional Hospital, during the “Sixth enemy offensive” (January 1944). Then on 12 Divisional Hospitals (from the hidden gorge river Demićka (near Šiprage), on January 4, 1944, dislocated in the surrounding villages and further to the Korićani.

However, in the War in Bosnia, the name of Korićani and Korićanske stijene is related to the brutal massacre on almost vertical ravine above Ilomska. Below part Korićanske Rocks, about miles from the bottom of the village, in the canyon Ilomska, August 21, 1992, members of the army and police of the Republic of Srpska are, bursts in the back, shot over 200 Prijedor civilians (Bosniaks and Croats). It has been proven and the ICTY Tribunal in The Hague. There they witnessed the rare survivors of Prijedorians from the Camp of Trnopolje (nearby Prijedor).

== Population ==
Korićani (1991)
| Census Year | Number | % |
|---|---|---|
| Croats | 927 | 65.65 |
| Serbs | 477 | 33.78 |
| Yugoslavians | 7 | 0.50 |
| Others | 1 | 0.07 |
| Total | 1412 | 100 |
