= Imljani =

Imljani Имљани
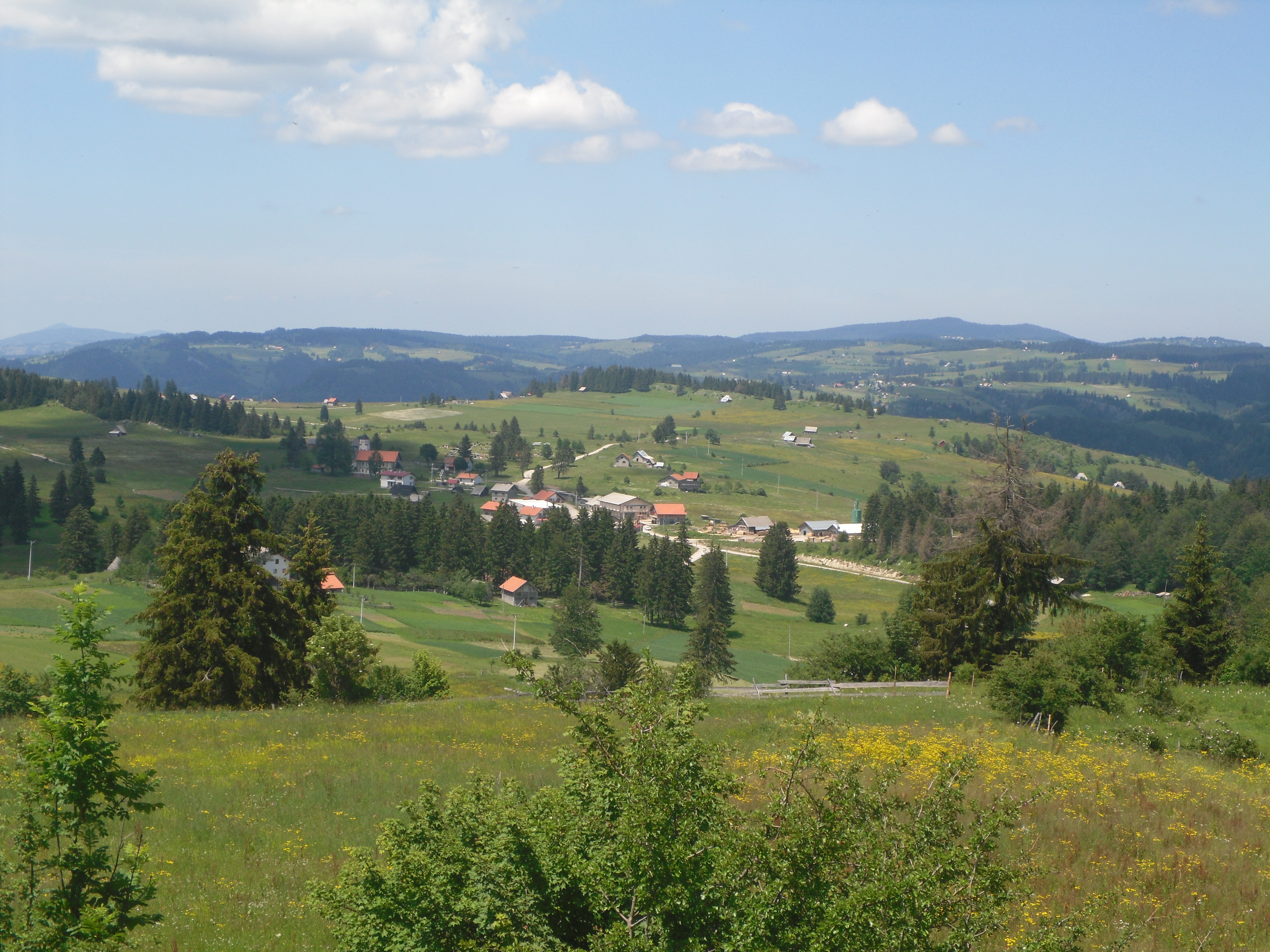

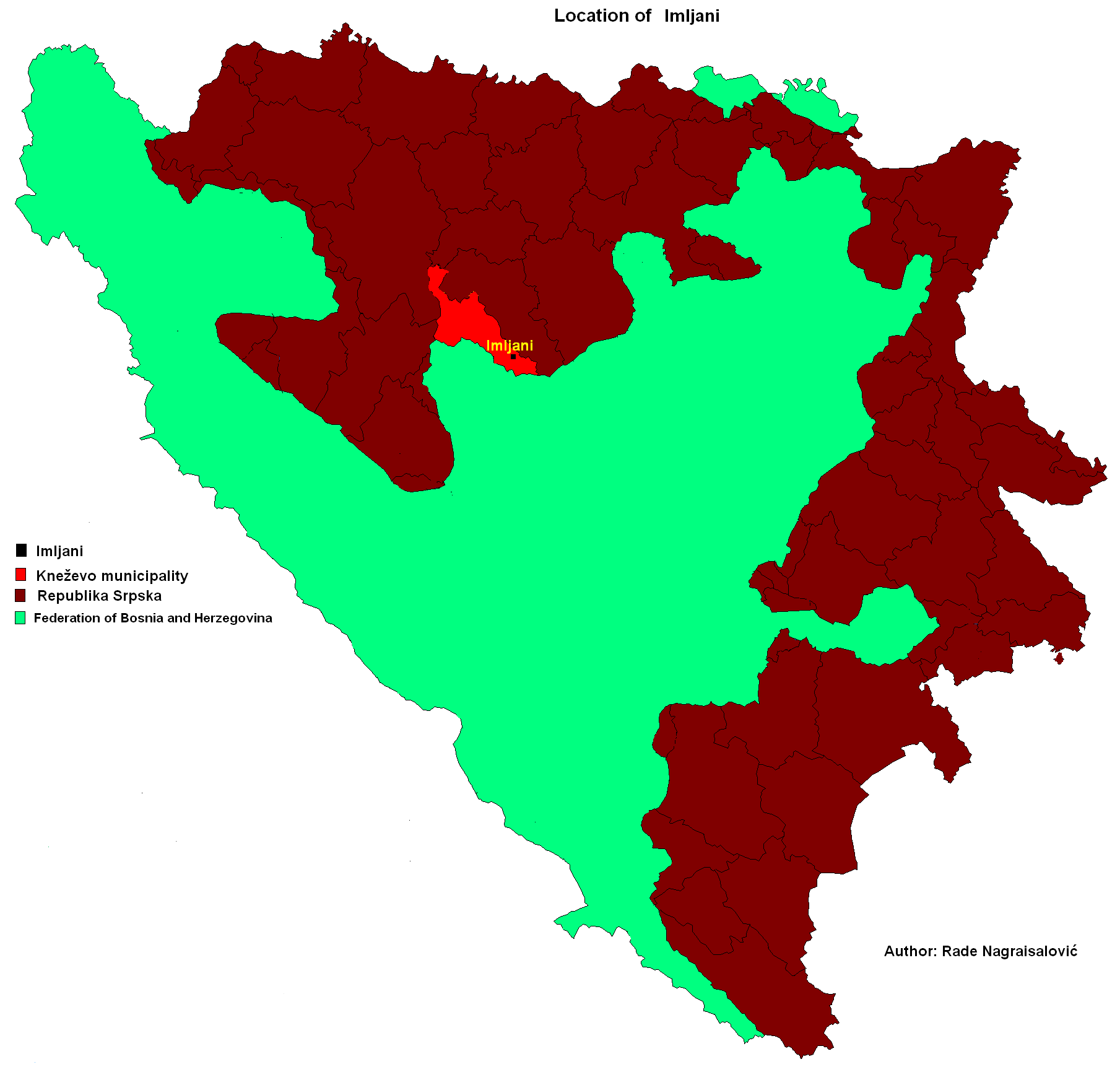
- Location of Imljani in Bosnia and Herzegovina
- Coordinates: 44°24′02″N 17°29′29″E
- Country: Bosnia and Herzegovina
- Entity: Republika Srpska
- Municipality: Kneževo

Population (1991)
  - Total: 1,565
- Time zone: UTC+2 (EET)
  - Summer (DST): UTC+3 (EEST)
- Postal code: 78234
- Area code: (+387) 51

Imljani (Serbian Cyrillic: Имљани) is a village in Republika Srpska, which is located in the municipality of Kneževo. Since 1954, Imljani was one of local communities of Former Šiprage Municipality in Former Kotor Varoš County.

Imljani consists of a few hamlets spreading on the lower vlašić's plateau, above the canyons of Ilomska and Ugar rivers. Actually, it covers the sub-plateau in the area of the angle between Korićanske stijene and Ugarske stijene ("Rocks of Ugar").

Central hamlet the Vidovište is on (around) 1200 meters above sea level. Around Vidovište, from Kobilja river (south-west) to Ilomska's canyon (north-east) there are the hamlets, as follows - North-eastern: Rijeka, Potok, Ponorci, Osredok, Benići, Škeljići, Pušići, Marići, Đenići and Đekin Do; South-western: Vujinovići, Makarići, Kelemeni, Novakovići, Šodolovići and Borje.

- Traditional women costumes (front and back) in Imljani (Hamlet Grubači, ≈1810)

== Ethnic composition, 1991 census ==
Ethnic composition of Skender Vakuf municipality, by settlements, 1991. census
settlement	total	Serbs	Muslims	Croats	Yugoslavs	others'
Imljani	1,565	1,544	3	1	5	12

Demography

Imljani
Census Year	1991	1981	1971
Serbs	1,544 (98.65%)	2,044 (98.83%)	2,052 (99.37%)
Bosniaks	3 (0.19%)	1 (0.04%)	0
Croats	1 (0.06%)	6 (0.29%)	5 (0.24%)
Yugoslavians	5 (0.31%)	2 (0.09%)	0
Others and unknown	12 (0.76%)	15 (0.72%)	8 (0.38%)
Total	1,565	2,068	2,065

== See also ==
- Skender Vakuf
- Ilomska
- Ugar
- Korićanske stijene
