= Nezavisne novine =

Bosnian newspaper

- Type: Daily
- Owner: NIGD "DNN"
- Founder: Željko Kopanja
- Editor-in-chief: Sandra Gojković-Arbutina
- Founded: 27 December 1995; 30 years ago
- Political alignment: Liberal
- Language: Serbian
- Headquarters: Banja Luka
- City: Banja Luka
- Country: Bosnia and Herzegovina
- Website: nezavisne.com

Nezavisne novine (English: "Independent Newspaper") is a Bosnian daily newspaper based in Banja Luka.

== Early history ==
In 1995, shortly after the Dayton Agreement which ended the Bosnian War, Željko Kopanja co-founded Nezavisne Novine, a weekly independent newspaper, in order to "foster improved relationships among Serbs, Muslims and Croats in Bosnia". The magazine was funded in part by the United States Agency for International Development, per a part of the Dayton Agreement which had called for funding for non-nationalist media. Beginning with a circulation of 4,000, the newspaper later became a daily, and its circulation climbed to 18,000 in the next five years.

In August 1999, Nezavisne Novine broke new ground by reporting on the murder of 200 Muslim civilians by Serbian police officers in 1992. With the report, the paper became the first Bosnian Serb paper to report on war crimes by Bosnian Serbs during the Yugoslav Wars. At the same time, Kopanja stated that he "stands by the thesis that no nation is genocidal or criminal, but individuals from certain nations are. I think that the Serbian people do not deserve to carry this burden ... I do not allow anyone to commit war crimes in my name or in the name of my people, nor does anyone have the right to do that."

== 1999 car bomb attack ==
Following the paper's reporting on atrocities committed by Bosnian Serbs, Kopanja was denounced by some groups as a traitor, and began to receive death threats. On October 22, 1999, Kopanja was nearly killed by a car bomb that exploded as he turned the ignition key. A nearby hospital amputated both of his legs. International supporters funded follow-up medical care for him in Austria, as well as high-quality prosthetic legs.

The bombing provoked outrage in both Muslim and Serbian media. Srpski Glas joined Nezavisne novine in printing a mostly blank front page three days after the bombing, carrying only the words "We Want to Know" to call for further investigation into the attack. Bosnian television interrupted programming to display the same message.

The perpetrators were not found, though Kopanja later stated his belief that Serbian security forces were responsible for the attack in retaliation for his reporting on war crimes. An investigation by the US Federal Bureau of Investigation supported his contention.

Kopanja continued to edit and write for Nezavisne novine despite the attack.
