= Vitovlje, Travnik =

Vitovlje
- Village
- Location within Bosnia and Herzegovina
- Coordinates: 44.33°N 17.49°E
- Country: Bosnia and Herzegovina
- Entity: Federation of Bosnia and Herzegovina
- Canton: Central Bosnia
- Municipality: Travnik

Area
  - Total: 8.76 sq mi (22.69 km^{2})
- Elevation: 2,900 ft (884 m)

Population (2013)
  - Total: 576
  - Density: 65.7/sq mi (25.4/km^{2})
- Time zone: UTC+1 (CET)
  - Summer (DST): UTC+2 (CEST)
- Postal code: ++387

Vitovlje (Serbian Cyrillic: Витовље)is a village in the Travnik Municipality, Central Bosnia Canton, Federation of Bosnia and Herzegovina. It is located on the slopes of the Vlašić Mountain, under Gavrića Brdo (Gavric's Hill, 1006 m), at an altitude of about 900 m. In medieval Bosnia, Vitovlje was in the Parish of Mel (Župa Mel).

Through the settlement the Dedića potok (Dedići's stream) flows through the settlement, a tributary of the Ugar, south of the Korićani's Rocks. The Pougarje stretches from Vitovlje, along the Ugar, between the mountains of Ranča and Ugarske stijene (Ugar's Rocks).

At the last census in 1991, before the collapse of Yugoslavia, Vitovlje had 708 inhabitants. During the Bosnian War, the village was destroyed and its inhabitants were either murdered or expelled. In the post-war period, the village was restored, and most of the refugees returned to their homes. According to the census of 2013, there were 576 inhabitants.

== Population (1991) ==
Ethnic Group	Number	%
Muslims	356	50.28
Serbs	315	44.49
Croats	27	3.81
Yugoslavs	5	0.71
Others and unknown	5	0.71

=== Overview ===
Vitovlje Census 2013: Total of 576 citizens.
Census Year	1991.	1981.	1971.
Bosniaks	356 (50,28%)	313 (39,42%)	333 (38,23%)
Serbs	315 (44,49%)	407 (51,26%)	478 (54,88%)
Croats	27 (3,814%)	38 (4,786%)	58 (6,659%)
Montenegrins	–	7 (0,882%)	–
Yugoslavs	5 (0,706%)	27 (3,401%)	2 (0,230%)
Others and unknown	5 (0,706%)	2 (0,252%)	
Total	708	794	871
