= Korićanske stijene =

Cliffs on Mount Vlašić in Bosnia and Herzegovina

Coordinates: 44.353°N 17.513°E

Korićanske stijene (also known as the Korićani Cliffs) are nearly vertical cliffs overlooking the canyon of the Ilomska River on Mount Vlašić in central Bosnia and Herzegovina. The cliffs were the site of the Korićani Cliffs massacre during the Bosnian War.

== Geography ==
The cliffs are located approximately 500 metres (1,600 ft) from the village of Korićani, at elevations ranging from about 750 to 1,100 metres (2,460 to 3,610 ft) above sea level. The ravine is approximately 350 to 400 metres (1,150 to 1,310 ft) deep. Nearby rock formations above the Ilomska River include the Marići and Imljani cliffs, which also reach an elevation of approximately 1,100 metres (3,600 ft).

== History ==
On August 21, 1992, the cliffs were the site of a massacre in which members of a Bosnian Serb police unit from Prijedor killed more than 200 unarmed men, predominantly Bosniaks and Croats. The victims had been separated from a convoy of civilians travelling from the Prijedor area towards Travnik. Twelve men survived the massacre.

Darko Mrđa, a member of the Prijedor police's Intervention Squad, was sentenced to 17 years' imprisonment by the International Criminal Tribunal for the former Yugoslavia in 2004 for his participation in the killings.

Forensic investigations at the site uncovered human remains in 2008. A further mass grave was discovered in September 2017, leading to additional exhumations and forensic examinations.

== Commemoration ==
Commemorative ceremonies are held at the cliffs on the anniversary of the massacre. Relatives of the victims, survivors and other attendees gather at the site and throw roses into the ravine in remembrance of those killed.

At the commemoration on August 21, 2023, participants threw 224 roses into the ravine in memory of the victims.

== See also ==
- Imljani
- Pougarje
- Skender Vakuf
