= Ilomska =

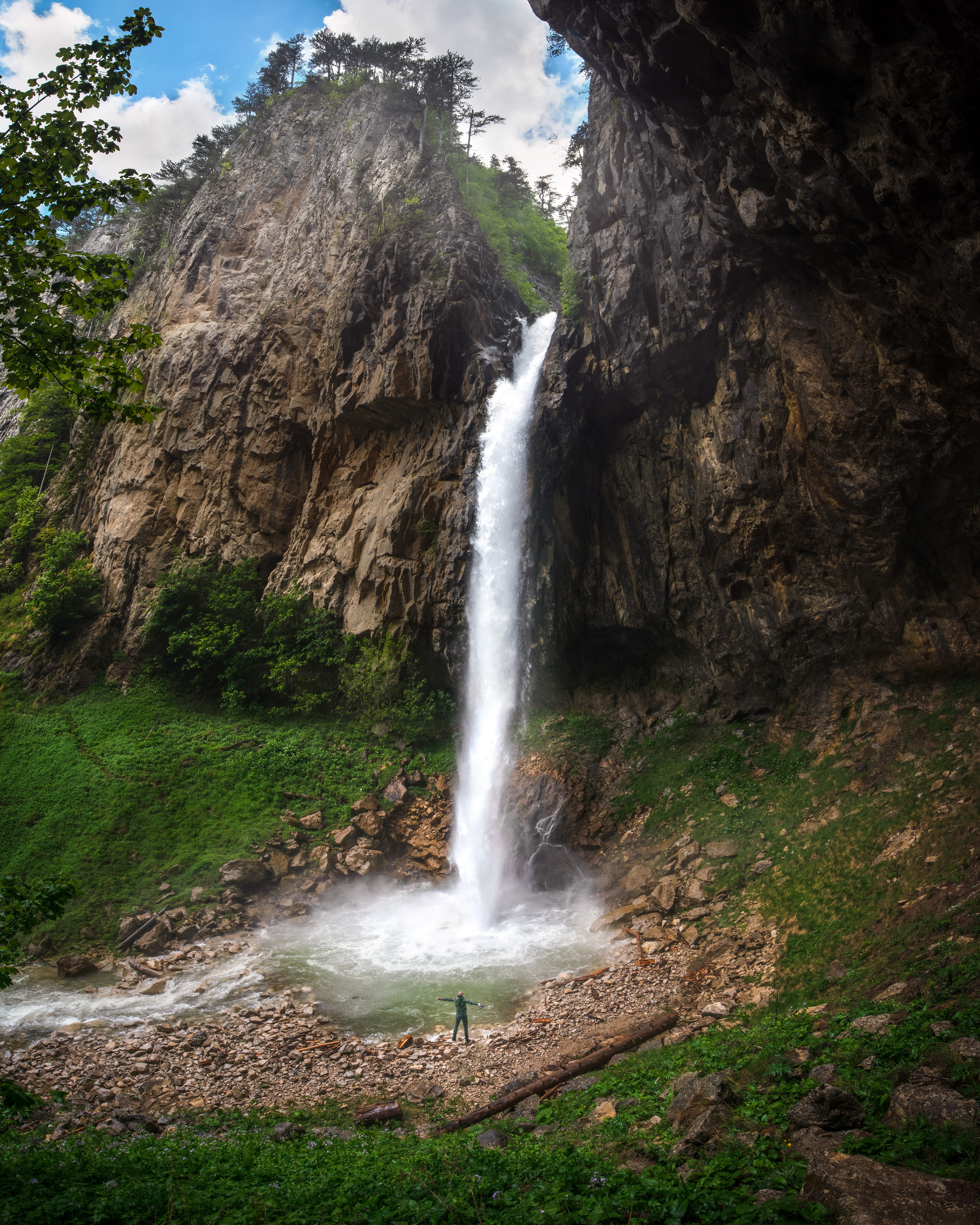

- Location within Bosnia and Herzegovina
- Native name: Иломска (Serbian)

Location
- Country: Bosnia and Herzegovina

Physical characteristics
- Source
  - location: Vlašić
  - coordinates: 44.393876°N 17.583944°E
- Mouth
  - location: Ugar
  - coordinates: 44.36553°N 17.49055°E
- Length: 20 km (12 mi)

Basin features
- Progression: Ugar→ Vrbas→ Sava→ Danube→ Black Sea

Ilomska is right tributary of the Ugar river in (Bosnia). It is about 20 kilometres (12 mi) in length, and its source is Vlašić Mountain. It is an essential body of water for surrounding wildlife. Ilomska flows between the Žežnička Greda (altitude 1,477 metres or 4,846 feet) and Javorak (1,499 m or 4,918 ft) mountains. It has a curved flow around Lisina (1,494 m or 4,902 ft) and Runjavica (1,316 m or 4,318 ft) mountains, through coniferous (fir and spruce) and mixed spruce-beech woods.

Its flow below Petrovo polje (English: Peter's plain) has sharp curves.

The richest right contributors are Manatovac (large stream), Mala Ilomska (Little Ilomska) and Devetero vrela (Nine springs), and left tributary Crna rijeka (Black River). At the Ravni Omar (mountain meadows), below Lisina Mountain, it enters a narrow highland continuing to “Korićanski most” (Korićani's Bridge), and a deep canyon below Korićanske stijene and Marića stijene (Marići's Rocks).

After two attractive Ilomska waterfalls, the river flows into the Ugar, a few kilometers downstream from Vitovlje village. The height of the bigger water flow is even (around) 40 meters (130 ft). Waterfalls in this wilderness attract mountain-climbers, tourists and fishermen, and the vertical rocky wall under the river's falls is suitable for alpinist exercises.

== History ==
Above Ilomska River there is Korićani village and a canyon below it (Korićanske stijene), the scaffold of more than 200 Bosniaks and Croats – the victims of the Serbs Police and Army forces (on August 21, 1992), a crime prosecuted and sentenced through number of indictments at The ICTY Tribunal in The Hague.

== See also ==
- Imljani
- Skender Vakuf
- List of rivers of Bosnia and Herzegovina
