= Dobretići =

Village and municipality in Bosnia and Herzegovina

Dobretići Općina Dobretići (Croatian)
- Village and municipality
- Coat of arms

- Location of Dobretići within Bosnia and Herzegovina.
- Interactive map of Dobretići
- Coordinates: 44°23′N 17°25′E
- Country: Bosnia and Herzegovina
- Entity: Federation of Bosnia and Herzegovina
- Canton: Central Bosnia

Government
  - Municipal mayor: Ivo Čakarić (HSS SR)

Area
  - Total: 59 km^{2} (23 sq mi)

Population (2013 census)
  - Total: 1,629
  - Density: 35/km^{2} (91/sq mi)
- Time zone: UTC+1 (CET)
  - Summer (DST): UTC+2 (CEST)
- Area code: +387 30

Dobretići (Serbian Cyrillic: Добретићи) is a village and municipality located in the Central Bosnia Canton of the Federation of Bosnia and Herzegovina, an entity of Bosnia and Herzegovina. It is one of the youngest and smallest municipalities in Bosnia and Herzegovina, hence being one of the poorest municipalities as well. Before the Bosnian War municipality of Dobretići was part of the municipality of Skender Vakuf (modern-day Kneževo).

== Name ==
The municipality of Dobretići was in the prior censuses known as Dobratići. After the Bosnian War, the name of the village became Dobretići, to align it with the name of the medieval Bosnian aristocrat Stjepan Dobreta. The locals of the municipality like to call the area around Dobretići Pougarje, after the local river, the Ugar.

== Geography ==
It is located on the mountain of Ranča in the Central Bosnia Canton of the Federation of Bosnia and Herzegovina. The municipality is 20 kilometers northeast from the town of Jajce.

== Administrative divisions ==
Today's municipality is made of 18 settlements: Brnjići, Bunar, Davidovići, Dobretići, Donji Orašac, Gornji Orašac, Kričići-Jejići, Melina, Mijatovići, Milaševci, Pavlovići, Prisika, Slipčevići, Vitovlje Malo, Vukovići, Zapeće, Zasavica i Zubovići.

== Demographics ==
=== Population ===
Population of settlements – Dobretići municipality
	Settlement	1971.	1981.	1991.	2013.
	Total			4,790	1,629
1	Dobretići	190	318	336	228
2	Zubovići			375	259

=== Ethnic composition ===
Ethnic composition – Dobretići village
	2013.	1991.	1981.	1971.
Total	228 (100,0%)	336 (100,0%)	318 (100,0%)	190 (100,0%)
Croats	228 (100,0%)	315 (93,75%)	271 (85,22%)	173 (91,05%)
Yugoslavs		15 (4,464%)	6 (1,887%)	
Bosniaks		3 (0,893%)		1 (0,526%)
Serbs		3 (0,893%)	32 (10,06%)	12 (6,316%)
Others			5 (1,572%)	1 (0,526%)
Montenegrins			3 (0,943%)	3 (1,579%)
Hungarians			1 (0,314%)	

Ethnic composition – Dobretići municipality
	2013.	1991.
Total	1,629 (100,0%)	4,790 (100,0%)
Croats	1,626 (99,82%)	4,720 (98,54%)
Others	2 (0,123%)	42 (0,877%)
Serbs	1 (0,061%)	6 (0,125%)
Yugoslavs		19 (0,397%)
Bosniaks		3 (0,063%)
