= Turbe, Travnik =

Turbe
- Village
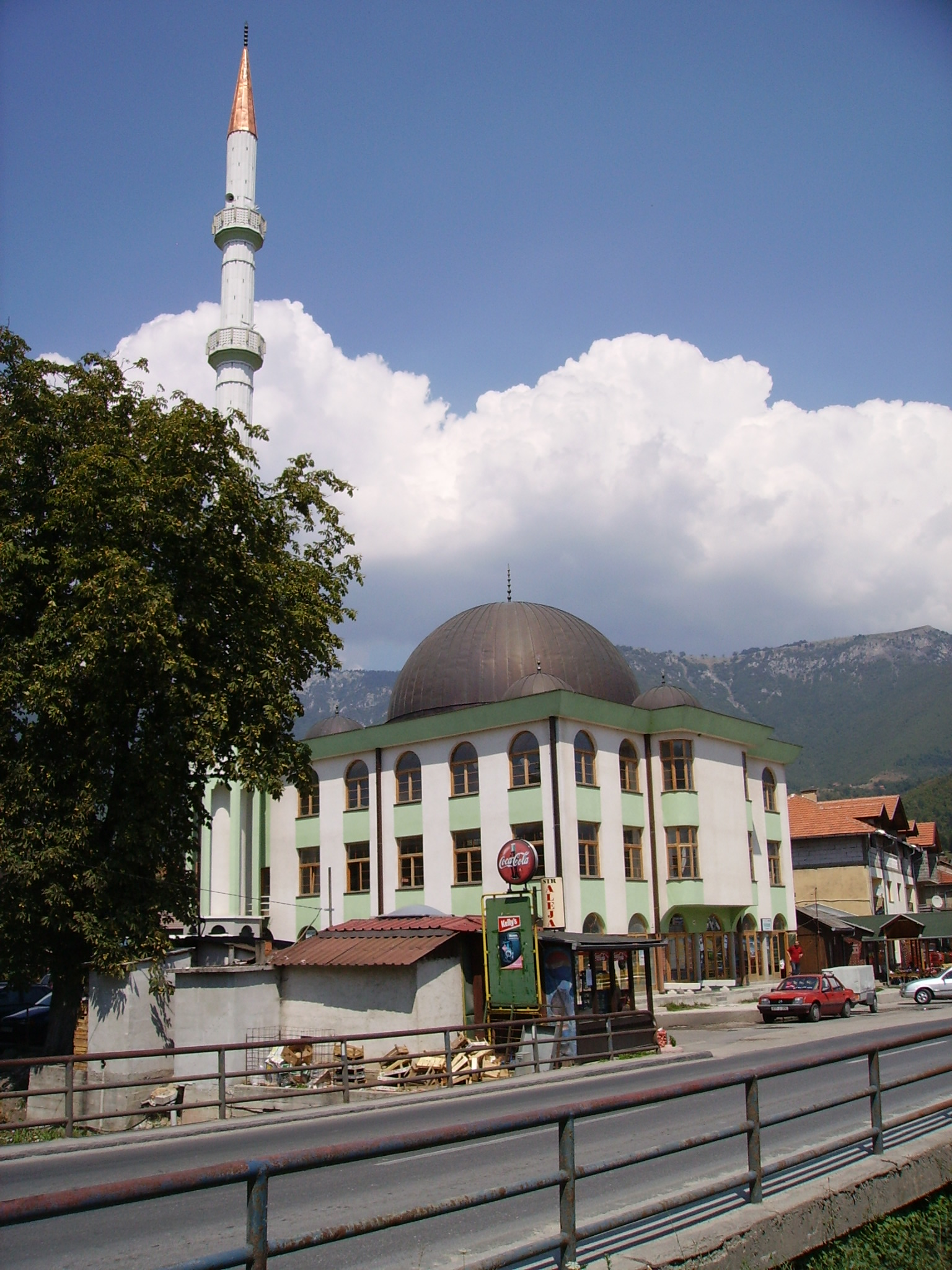
- New mosque in Turbe

- Location within Bosnia and Herzegovina
- Coordinates: 44.24°N 17.57°E
- Country: Bosnia and Herzegovina
- Entity: Federation of Bosnia and Herzegovina
- Canton: Central Bosnia
- Municipality: Travnik

Area
  - Total: 0.95 sq mi (2.45 km^{2})
- Highest elevation: 2,018 ft (615 m)
- Lowest elevation: 1,952 ft (595 m)

Population (2013)
  - Total: 3,890
  - Density: 4,110/sq mi (1,590/km^{2})
- Time zone: UTC+1 (CET)
  - Summer (DST): UTC+2 (CEST)
- Area code: +387 (031)

Turbe is a settlement in the Travnik municipality, Federation of Bosnia and Herzegovina, Bosnia and Herzegovina. The name is derived from the Turkish türbe.

== Population ==
Turbe: Census Year 2013: Total of 3,890 inhabitants
Census Year	2013	1991	1981	1971
Bosniaks	3.460 (88,95%)	2.154 (47.35%)	1.658 (47.11%)	798 (43.94%)
Serbs	39 (1,00%)	1.056 (23.21%)	774 (21.99%)	486 (26.76%)
Croats	255 (6,56%)	886 (19.47%)	731 (20.77%)	454 (25.00%)
Yugoslavs	-	309 (6.79%)	322 (9.15%)	60 (3.30%)
Others	136 (3,50%)	144 (3.16%)	34 (0.96%)	18 (0.99%)
Total	3.890	4.549	3.519	1.816

== Geography ==
The village of Turbe is located in the upper valley of the Lašva River, about seven kilometres west of Travnik, on the M5 towards Donji Vakuf. This is where the two headwaters Karaulska Lašva (coming from the Karaula Pass) and Komarska Lašva (coming from the Komar Pass) unite.

== History ==
In the 15th century, the village was conquered by the Ottomans. In 1878, as a result of the Congress of Berlin, Turbe was placed under Austro-Hungarian administration.

During the Second World War, the village was badly destroyed. In the Battle of Travnik, in which the Yugoslav People's Liberation Army fought against Croatian NDH troops at the end of 1943, a total of 3000 people died, including 1000 civilians.

In the Bosnian war from 1992 to 1995, Turbe was directly on the front line for a long time and also the 312th Mountain Brigade of Army of Republic of Bosnia and Herzegovina was located in the region of Turbe.

== Sport ==
The town's most important club is the football club NK Vlašić Turbe, which until 2007 played in the 2nd division of the Federation of Bosnia and Herzegovina, the country's five-tier 3rd division at the time

== See also ==
- Enes Mameledžija
- Travnik
