= Ugar (river) =

River in Bosnia

Ugar Brzica
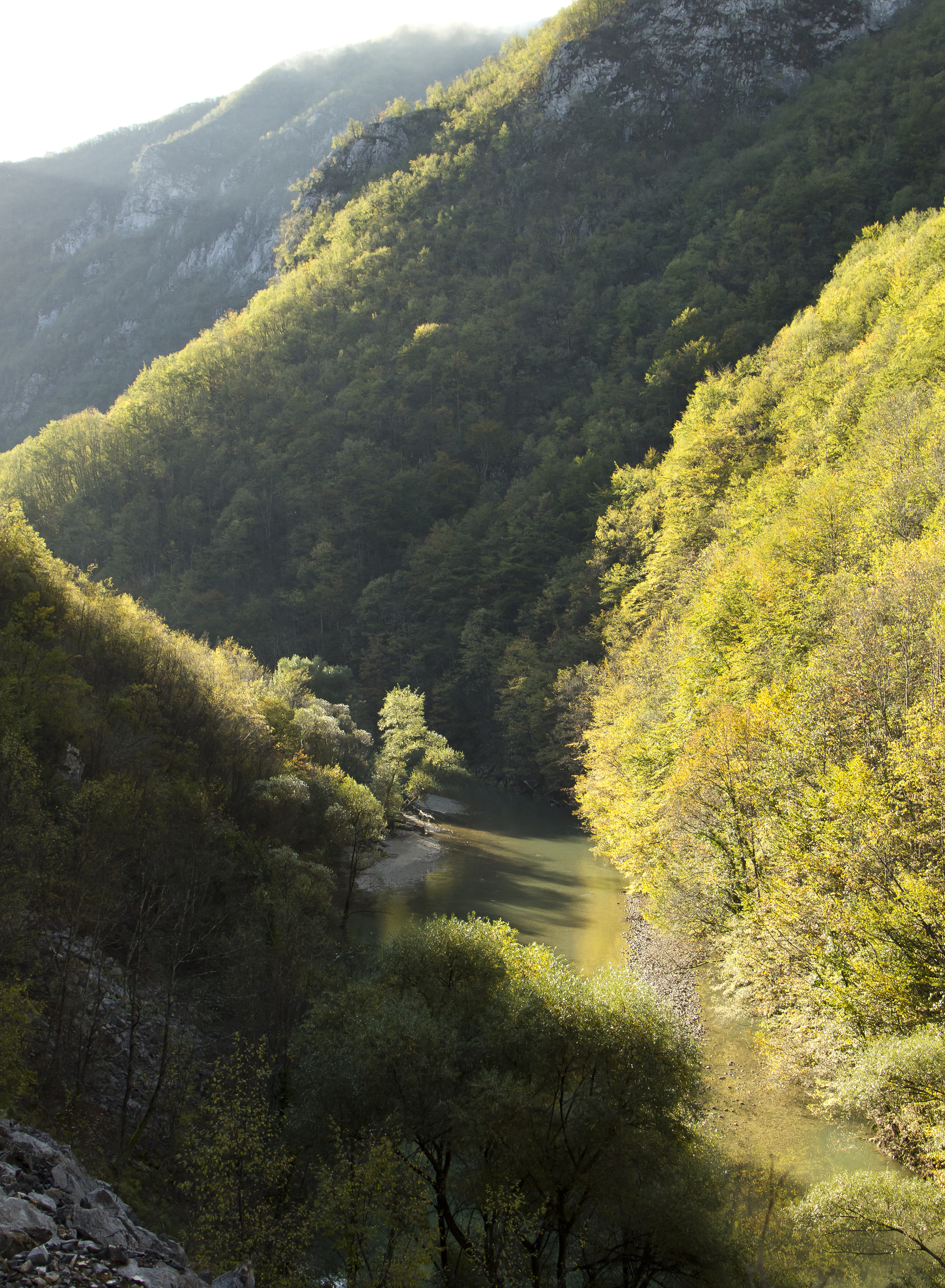
- Ugar river, at the bottom of its deep canyon

- Ugar river in Bosnia and Herzegovina

Location
- Country: Bosnia and Herzegovina
- Canton: Srednja Bosna

Physical characteristics
- Source
  - location: Prelivode, Vlašić Mt.
  - coordinates: 44°20′38″N 17°39′22″E
  - elevation: ~1,590 m (5,220 ft)
- Mouth
  - location: Vrbas
  - coordinates: 44°27′12″N 17°14′20″E
  - elevation: 268 m (879 ft)
- Length: 44.5 km (27.7 mi)
- Basin size: 328 km^{2} (127 mi^{2})
- Discharge
  - location: Mouth
  - average: 6.98 m^{3}/s (246 cu ft/s)

Basin features
- Progression: Vrbas→ Sava→ Danube→ Black Sea
- Tributaries
  - right: Ugrić, Pljačkovac, Ilomska, Kobilja, Zirin potok, Kusin potok
- Waterfalls: several

The Ugar (Serbian Cyrillic: Угар, known as the Brzica until 1878) is a river of Bosnia, a tributary of the Vrbas river. It originates at the slopes of Vlašić, upstream of Sažići and Melina villages (at around of 1,590 meters above sea level), a watershed area of Vrbanja, Ilomska and Bila rivers. The valley along the Ugar is known as Pougarje.

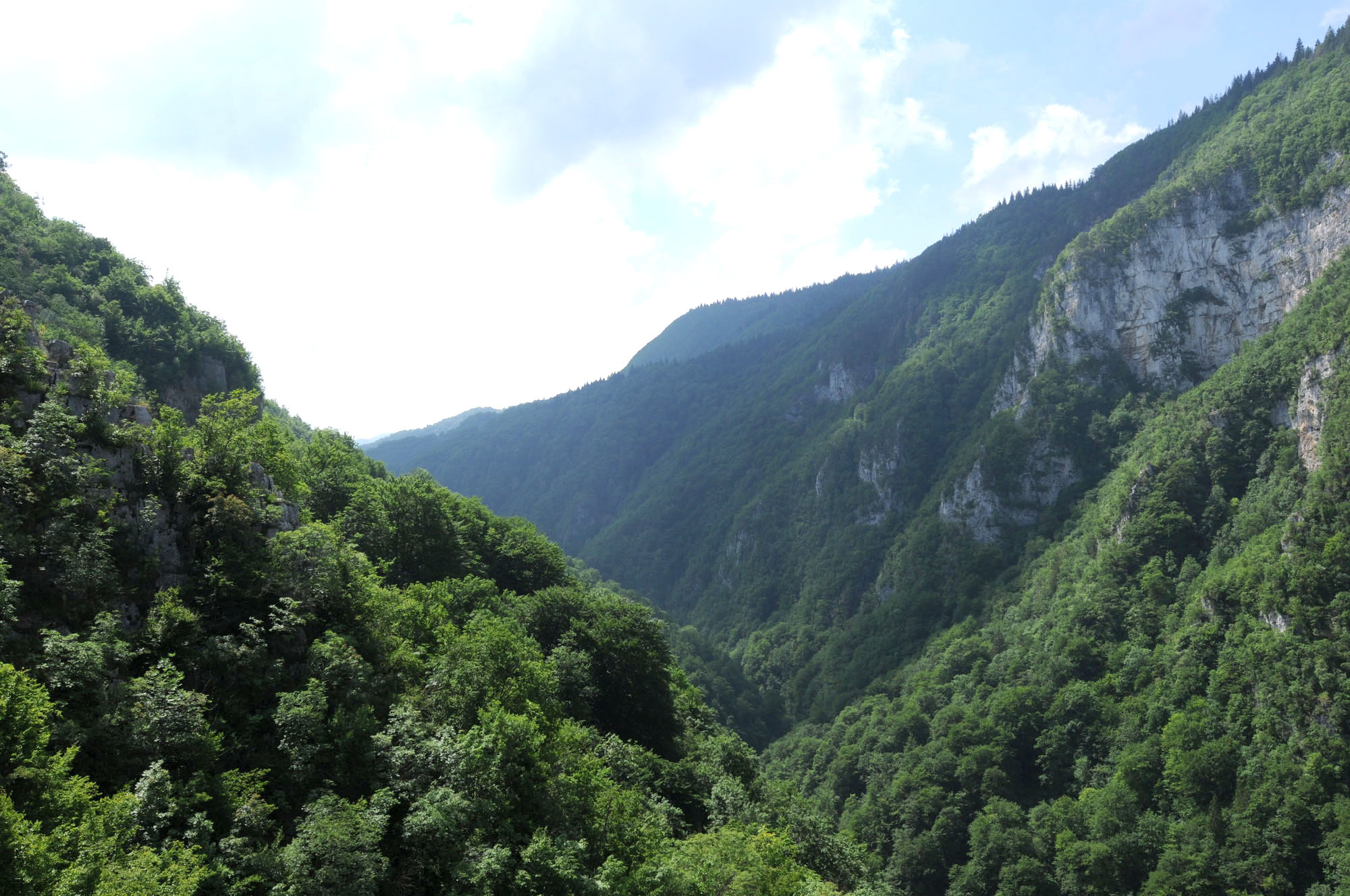
Section of the Ugar canyon

== Geography and hydrology ==
The Ugar's length is around 44.5 kilometres, and its catchment is around 328 km^{2}. Its largest right tributaries are: Pljačkovac, Ilomska, Kobilja, Zirin Potok and Kusin Potok (Ziro's and Kuso's creeks), and Ugrić; left tributaries are the creeks: namely Lužnica Potok, Dedića Potok, Andrijevića Potok, Bunar, Oraški Potok, and Kukavički Potok.

At its source, the Ugar and its headwaters tributaries create a series of waterfalls. After short, but deep canyon (below the Babanovac plateau), it enters Pougarje, under the Ranča Mountain. The Ugar then flows into a deep and long canyon under Skender Vakuf, around 20 kilometres downstream of Jajce. Notch of the Canyon is a very arduous and its maximal depth is (approximately) 500 m. The area in the valley along the Ugar, from Vitovlje to its Canyon, is marked as Pougarje

The area along the Ugar is known as Pougarje. Pougarje extends from the Vitovlje village to the Ugar's entrance into the canyon below Skender Vakuf. It is located between Ranča Mountain (left) and rock's massif Korićanske stijene - Ugarske stijene (Ugar's rocks). From Vitovlje to Ugar's canyon it is known as the Lower (Donje) Pougarje, while the area on Ranča's slopes is Upper (Gornje) Pougarje.

The valley (especially the slopes of Ranča) is rich in coniferous and mixed deciduous-coniferous forests. The upper and middle part of the basin in the area still has the character of a salmonid water, now there are only (brown trout), while the huchen and grayling have disappeared in the recent past. The surrounding forests are inhabited by the big game (fox, wolf, bear, wild boar, and the others). At in a brushwood at the mouth of the Ilomska, in a protected hunting area, there is feeding place for carnivores.

== See also ==
- List of rivers of Bosnia and Herzegovina
- Travnik
