= Vlašić (Bosnia and Herzegovina) =

Mountain in Bosnia and Herzegovina

- Влашић
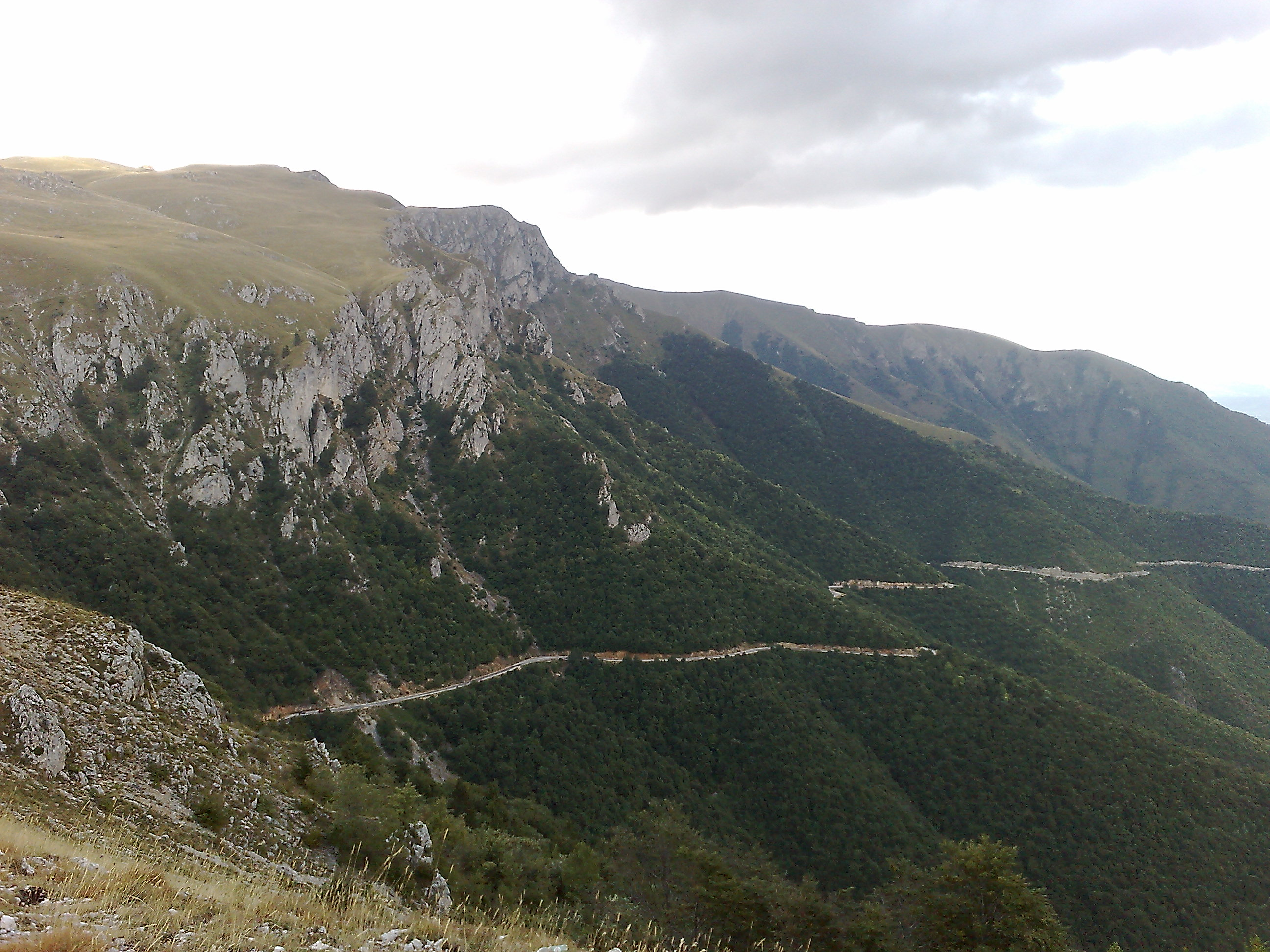
- View of Vlašić

Highest point
- Elevation: 1,943 m (6,375 ft)
- Prominence: 1,022 m (3,353 ft)
- Listing: Ribu
- Coordinates: 44°17′00″N 17°40′00″E

Geography
- Location within Bosnia and Herzegovina
- Location: Bosnia and Herzegovina
- Parent range: Dinaric Alps

Vlašić (Serbian Cyrillic: Влашић) is a mountain in the geographical center of Bosnia and Herzegovina. Its highest peak is Paljenik (also called Opaljenik) with an elevation of 1,933 m. It is famous for its pastures, cattle-breeding and cheese. It is closest to the town of Travnik, which it overlooks.

== Climate ==
The average winter temperature is -4 °C (29 °F) while the average summer temperature is 14.2 °C (60.8 °F). In the wintertime snowfall is abundant with an average snow coverage of up to 5 months in accumulation between 1.5 and 2.1 meters.

== Culture ==
The toponym is derived from vlasi, "Vlachs", a transhumant people. Academics like Mark Vego believe that the Vlachs, remnant of the Roman Empire, brought one of the trademarks of Vlašić, the Vlašić cheese, in around 1000. It is originally made from fresh sheep milk, but also cow milk, and then left to ripen for two to three months. By perfecting the recipe, the Vlachs passed on the tradition to the cattle breeders from the surrounding mountains. Today, the cheese is produced throughout the area and is regarded one of the traditions of the region. In addition to the cheese, there are two other trademarks, the Tornjak dog and Pramenka sheep. The Tornjak is believed to have existed for more than a millennium, bred to guard from wolves and bears. Its etymology is connected to Neo-Latin torni acca, "turn here".

== History ==
The mountain was an operational site of the World War II in Yugoslavia.

=== Bosnian War ===
During the Bosnian War, it was held by the Bosnian Serb army (VRS). It was tactically important, overlooking Travnik which was held by the Army of the Republic of Bosnia and Herzegovina (ARBiH). It was taken over by the ARBiH sometime before the Dayton Agreement, and subsequently incorporated into the Federation of B&H.

== Tourism ==
The mountain is a major center for winter tourism due to its excellent accommodation for skiing, snowboarding and other winter sports. It is also a popular destination for summer and eco tourism with many hiking trails and undisturbed wilderness areas.
