= Slavićka =

Slavićka Славићка (Serbian)
- Village (Selo)
- Location within Bosnia and Herzegovina
- Coordinates: 44°49′25″N 16°58′16″E
- Country: Bosnia and Herzegovina
- Entity: Republika Srpska
- Municipality: Banja Luka

Population (2013)
  - Total: 781
- Time zone: UTC+1 (CET)
  - Summer (DST): UTC+2 (CEST)

Slavićka (Serbian Cyrillic: Славићка) is a village in the municipality of Banja Luka, Republika Srpska, Bosnia and Herzegovina.
