= Šljivno, Banja Luka =

Šljivno Шљивно (Serbian)
- Village (Selo)
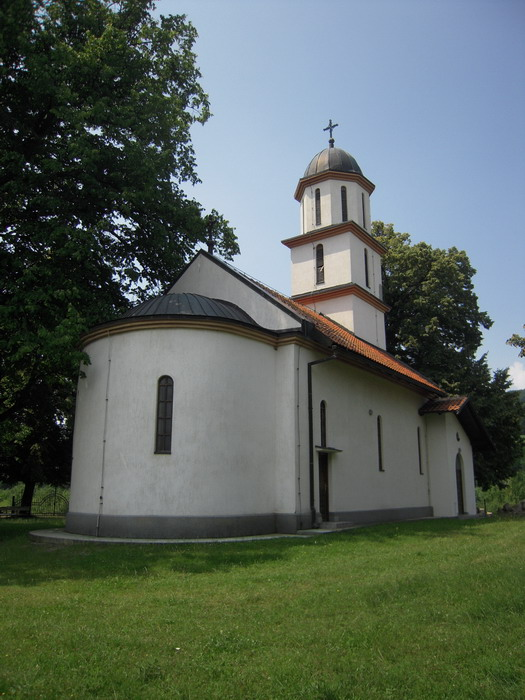
- Orthodox church in Šljivno

- Location within Bosnia and Herzegovina
- Coordinates: 44°39′36″N 17°04′48″E
- Country: Bosnia and Herzegovina
- Entity: Republika Srpska
- Municipality: Banja Luka

Population (2013)
  - Total: 0
- Time zone: UTC+1 (CET)
  - Summer (DST): UTC+2 (CEST)

Šljivno (Serbian Cyrillic: Шљивно) is a village in the municipality of Banja Luka, Republika Srpska, Bosnia and Herzegovina. The village is currently uninhabited.

== Geography ==
The village is located 25 km southwest of Banja Luka.

== Population ==
The village was abandoned after the start of the construction of a military training ground on Mount Manyacha.

Nationality	1991	1981	1971	1961
Serbs			105 (99.05%)	818
Other			1 (0.94%)	
Total	0	0	106	818

== History ==
The first mention of the village dates back to 1541. The village developed slowly, with a population of just over a thousand people by the early 1960s. Over time, the construction of a military training ground on Mount Manyacha began, and all residents were forced to leave the village forever.

== Notable Natives ==
- Vitomir Miletic; Serbian artist born here in 1967.

== Links ==
- Official website of the town and municipality of Banja Luka
