= Čokori =

Čokori Чокори (Serbian)
- Village (Selo)
- Location within Bosnia and Herzegovina
- Coordinates: 44°46′58″N 17°06′07″E
- Country: Bosnia and Herzegovina
- Entity: Republika Srpska
- Municipality: Banja Luka

Population (2013)
  - Total: 199
- Time zone: UTC+1 (CET)
  - Summer (DST): UTC+2 (CEST)

Čokori (Serbian Cyrillic: Чокори) is a village in the municipality of Banja Luka, Republika Srpska, Bosnia and Herzegovina.

== Demographics ==
Ethnic groups in the village include:

- 198 Serbs (99.50%)
- 1 Other (0.50%)
