= Ponir =

Ponir Понир (Serbian)
- Village (Selo)
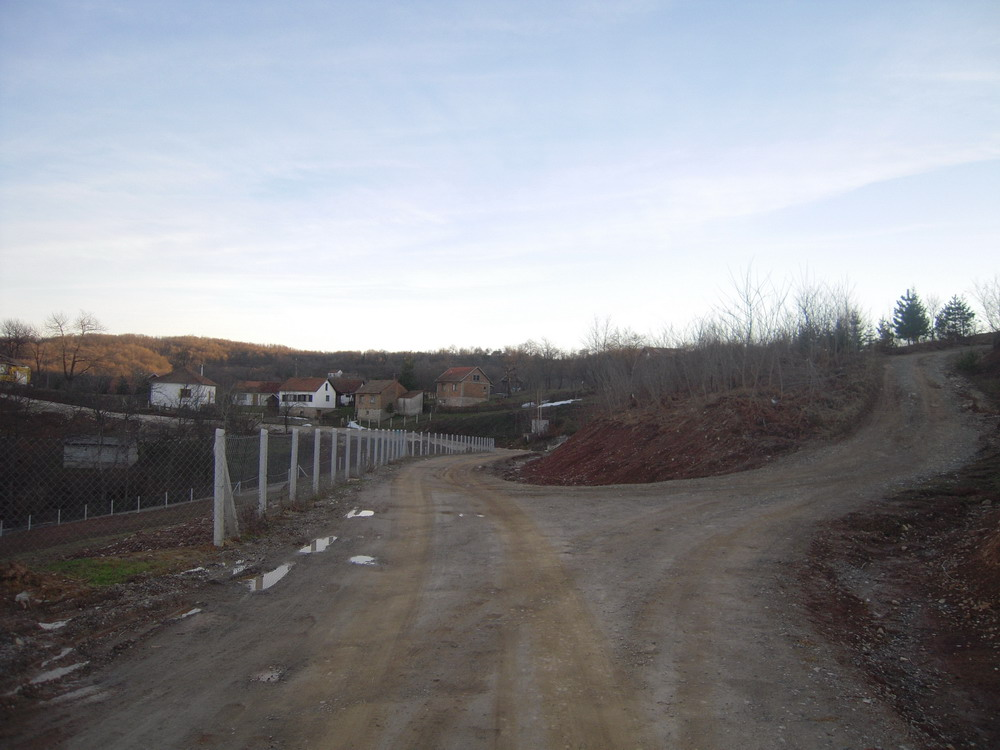

- Location within Bosnia and Herzegovina
- Coordinates: 44°43′N 17°13′E
- Country: Bosnia and Herzegovina
- Entity: Republika Srpska
- Municipality: Banja Luka

Population (2013)
  - Total: 14
- Time zone: UTC+1 (CET)
  - Summer (DST): UTC+2 (CEST)

Ponir (Serbian Cyrillic: Понир) is a village in the municipality of Banja Luka, Republika Srpska, Bosnia and Herzegovina. It is located on the mountain Ponir, near the city of Banja Luka.

Until 1969 and the subsequent earthquake in Banja Luka, a four-year school operated in the village.

== Demography ==
According to the first population censuses, about 400 people lived in the village.

Nationality	1991	1981	1971	1961
Serbs	60 (100 %)	96 (88,07 %)	239 (99,58 %)	415
Yugoslavs		11 (10,09 %)	1 (0,41 %)	
Croats				3
Other		2 (1,83 %)		3
Total	60	109	240	421

== See also ==
Banja Luka
