= Priječani =

Priječani Пријечани (Serbian)
- Village (Selo)
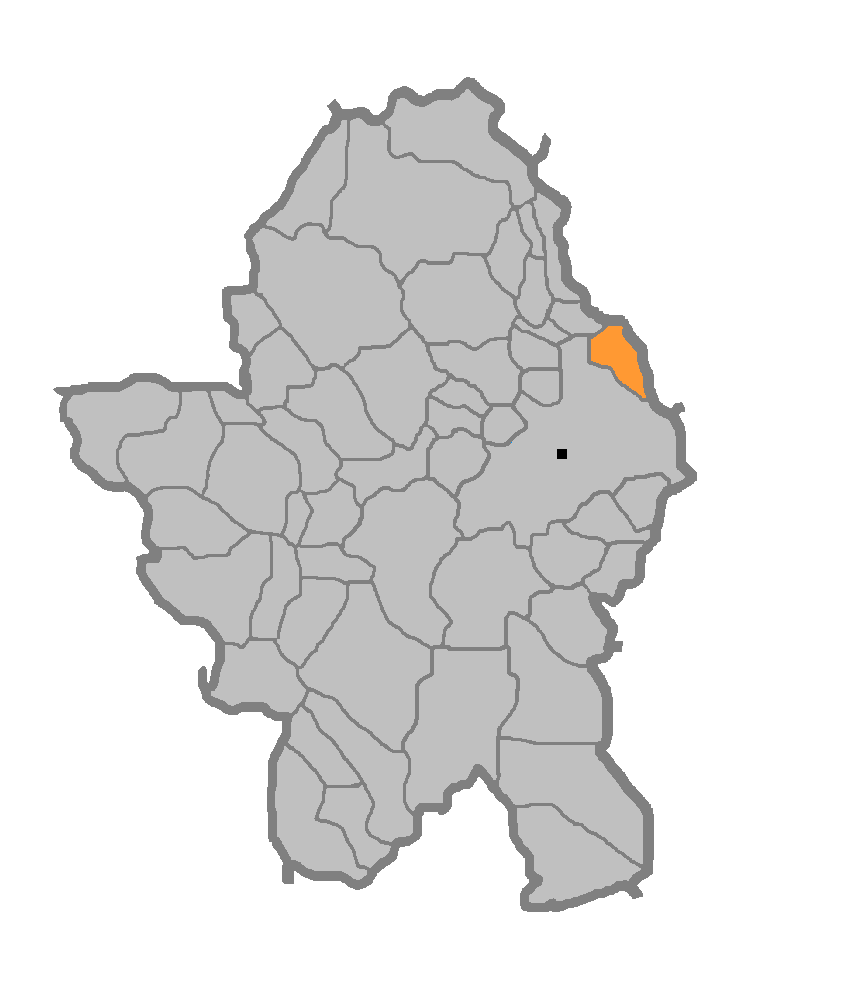
- Position within Banja Luka

- Location within Bosnia and Herzegovina
- Coordinates: 44°49′N 17°14′E
- Country: Bosnia and Herzegovina
- Entity: Republika Srpska
- Municipality: Banja Luka

Population (2013)
  - Total: 2,101
- Time zone: UTC+1 (CET)
  - Summer (DST): UTC+2 (CEST)

Priječani (Serbian Cyrillic: Пријечани) is a village in the municipality of Banja Luka, Republika Srpska, Bosnia and Herzegovina.
