= Banja Luka =

City in Republika Srpska, Bosnia and Herzegovina

Banja Luka Бања Лука
- City
- Grad Banja Luka; Град Бања Лука; City of Banja Luka
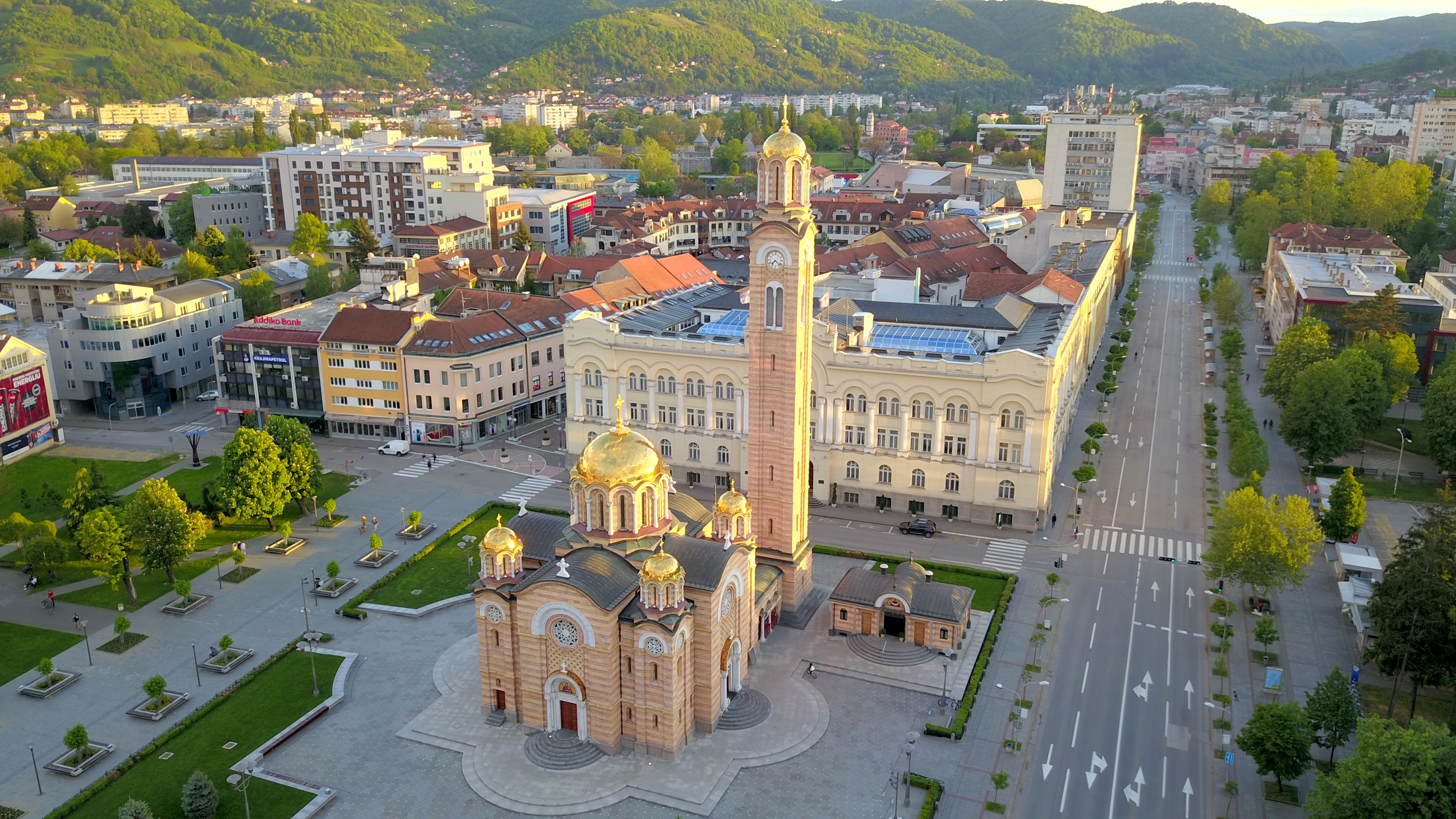
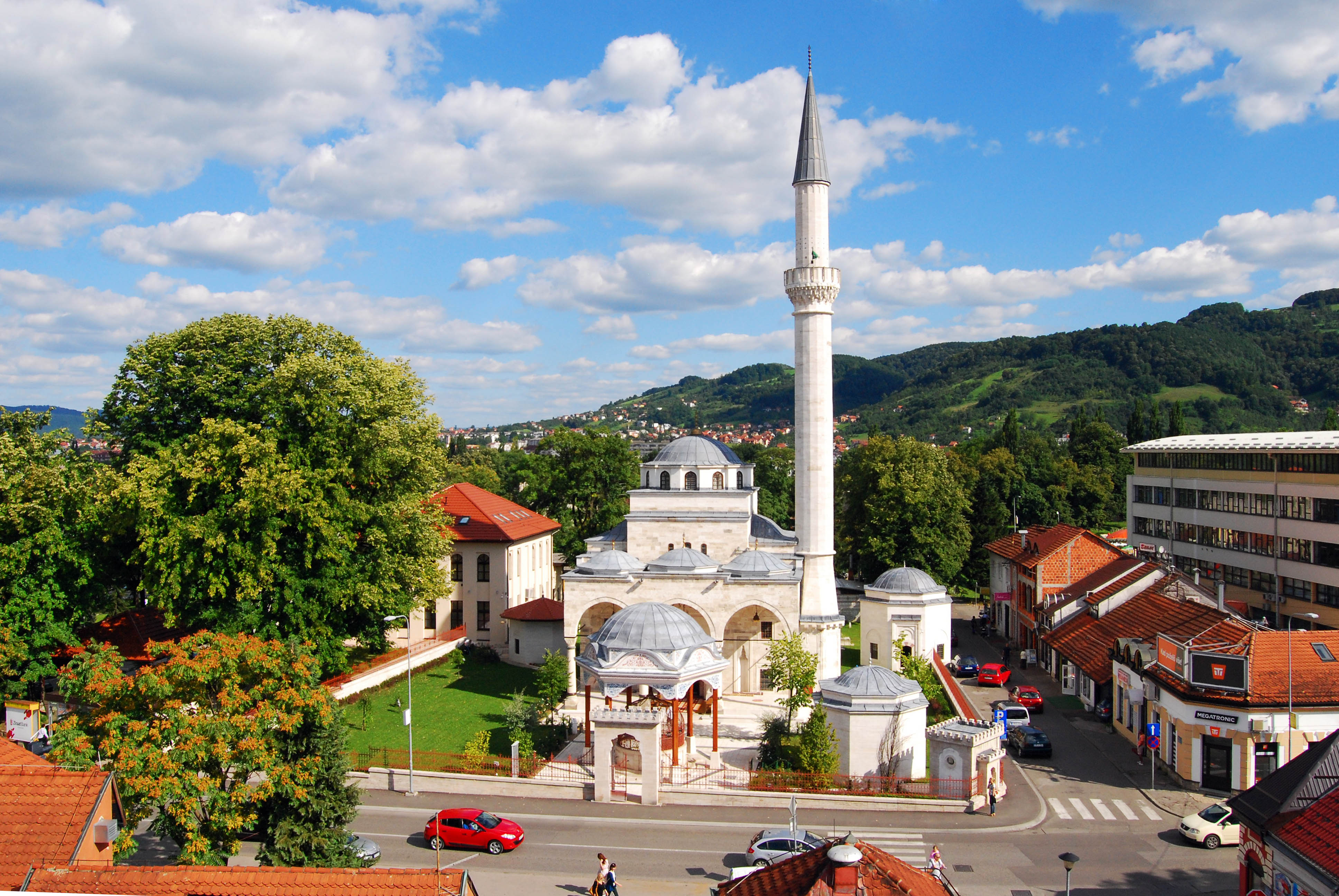
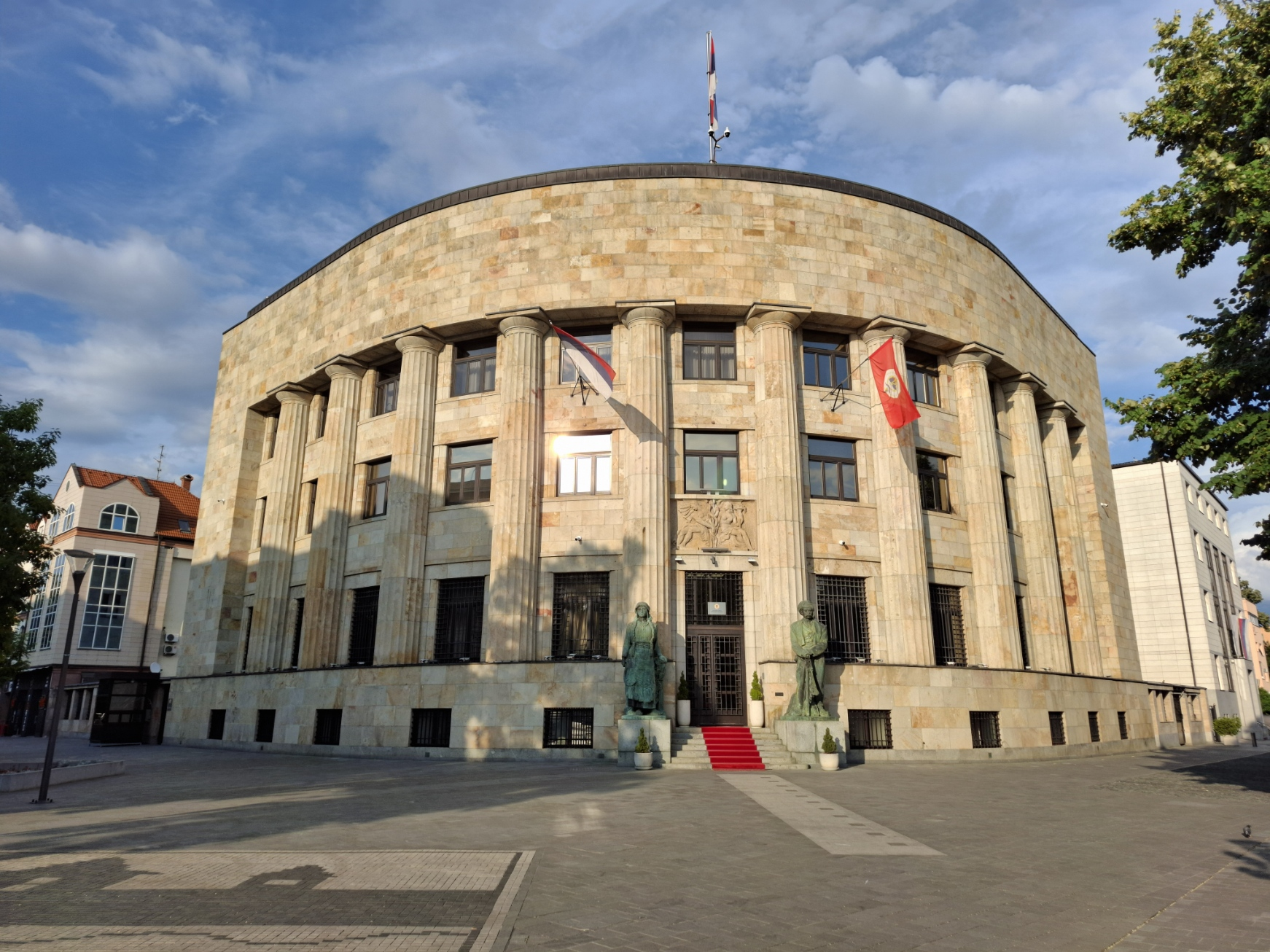
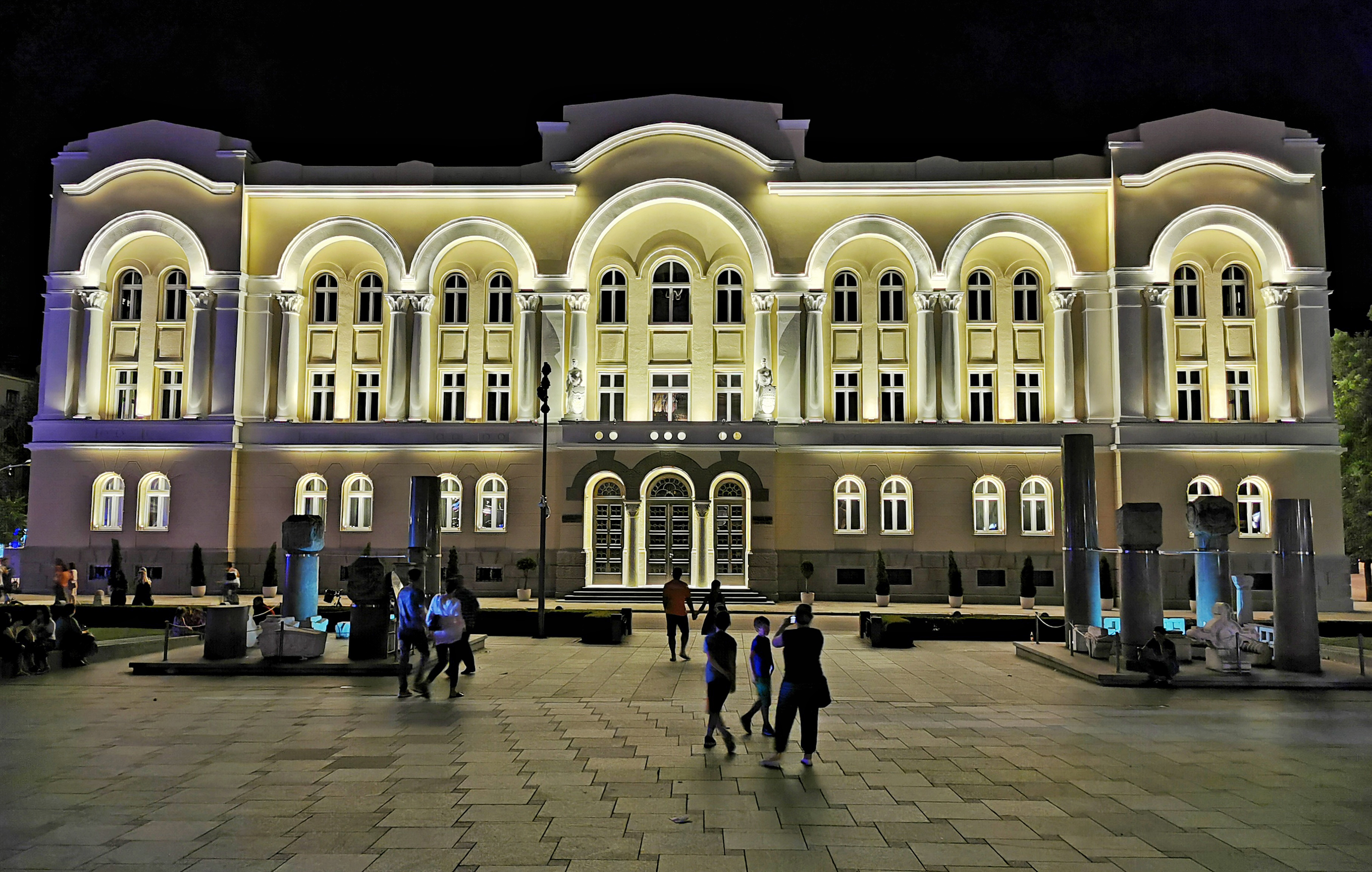
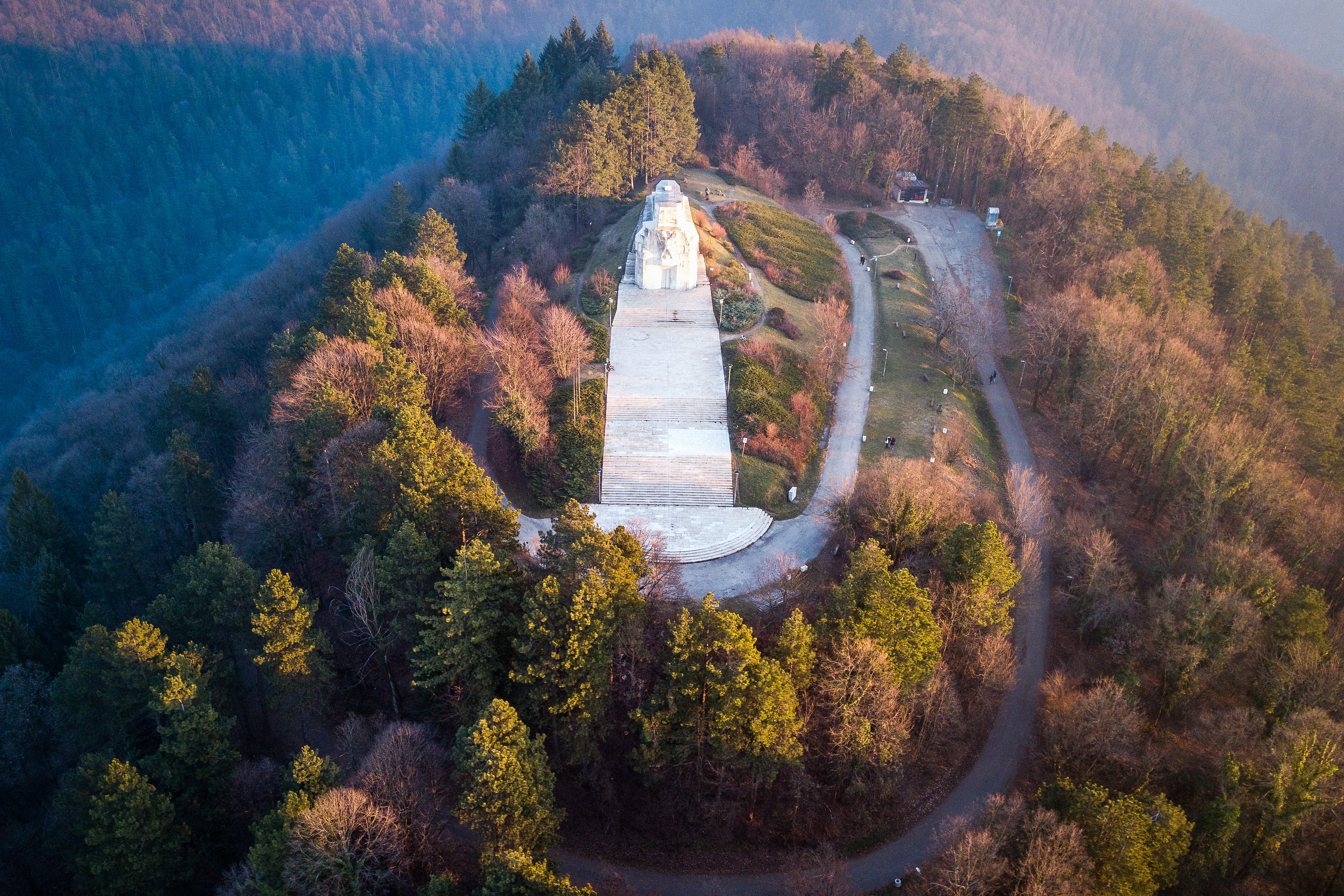
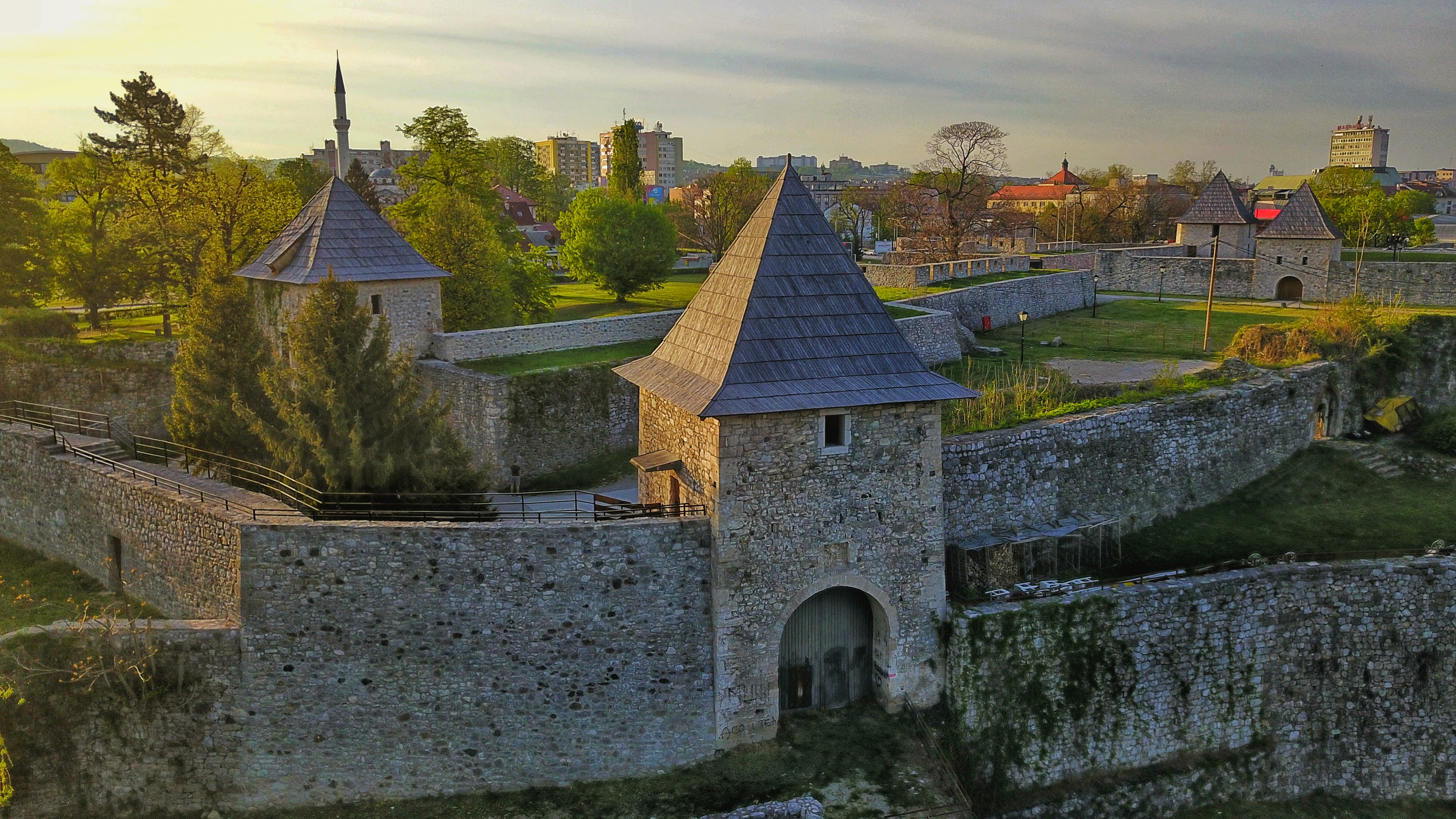
- Banja Luka centre with Cathedral of Christ the Saviour Ferhat Pasha Mosque Palace of the Republic Banski dvor Banj brdo Kastel Fortress

- Flag Coat of arms

- Location (dark blue) within Bosnia and Herzegovina. Light blue indicates Republika Srpska, pink indicates the subnational Federation of Bosnia and Herzegovina, and yellow is the Brčko District.
- Interactive map of Banja Luka
- Location within Bosnia and Herzegovina Location within Europe
- Coordinates: 44°46′21″N 17°11′33″E
- Country: Bosnia and Herzegovina
- Entity: Republika Srpska
- Geographical region: Bosanska Krajina

Government
  - Body: City Assembly of Banja Luka
  - Mayor: Draško Stanivuković (PDP)

Area
  - City: 1,238.91 km^{2} (478.35 sq mi)
- Elevation: 163 m (535 ft)

Population (2013)
  - City: 185,042
  - Urban: 138,963
- Time zone: UTC+1 (CET)
  - Summer (DST): UTC+2 (CEST)
- Postal code: 78000
- Area code: +387 51
- Website: www.banjaluka.rs.ba

Banja Luka (Serbian Cyrillic: Бања Лука, pronounced [bǎɲa lǔːka]) or Banjaluka (Serbian Cyrillic: Бањалука, pronounced [baɲalǔːka]) is the second-largest city in Bosnia and Herzegovina, and the most populous in Republika Srpska. It is Republika Srpska's main economic, political, and administrative centre. Banja Luka is the traditional centre of the densely forested Bosanska Krajina region of northwestern Bosnia and Herzegovina. According to the 2013 census, the city proper has a population of 138,963, while its administrative area comprises a total of 185,042 inhabitants. The City Day of Banja Luka is celebrated on 22 April, commemorating the liberation of the city at the end of World War II.

The city is home to the University of Banja Luka and the University Clinical Center of the Republika Srpska, as well as numerous entity- and state-level institutions of Republika Srpska and Bosnia and Herzegovina, respectively. The city is located on the Vrbas river. Banja Luka was declared a European City of Sport in 2018 and designated a UNESCO City of Music in 2023.

== Name ==
The name Banja Luka was first mentioned in a document dated 6 February 1494 by Ladislaus II of Hungary. The name is interpreted as the 'Ban's meadow', from the words ban (a medieval noble title), and luka ('valley' or 'meadow'). The identity of the ban and the meadow in question remains uncertain, and popular etymology combines the modern words banja ('bath' or 'spa'), or bajna ('marvelous'), and luka ('port'). A different interpretation is suggested by the Hungarian name Lukácsbánya, in English 'Luke's Mine'. In modern usage, the name is pronounced and occasionally written as one word (Banjaluka).

== Geography ==
=== Overview ===
Banja Luka covers some 96.2 km^{2} (37.1 sq mi) of land in Bosnia and Herzegovina and is situated on both banks of the Vrbas in the Banja Luka valley, which is characteristically flat within the otherwise hilly region. Banja Luka's centre lies 163 m (534.78 ft) above sea level.

The source of the Vrbas River is about 90 km (56 mi) to the south at the Vranica mountain. Its tributaries — the Suturlija, the Crkvena, and the Vrbanja — flow into the Vrbas at various points in the city. Numerous springs can be found nearby.

The area around Banja Luka consists mostly of woodland and arable fields, although there are many mountains further from the city, especially south of the city. The most notable of these mountains are Ponir (743 m), Osmača (950 m), Manjača (1,214 m), Čemernica (1,338 m), and Tisovac (1,173 m). These are all part of the Dinaric Alps mountain range.

Banja Luka is particularly exposed to the risk of earthquakes. The first recorded major earthquake struck the city in 1888 with a magnitude of 5.5; a quake of similar strength followed in 1935. The most severe earthquake in the city's history struck in 1969 with a magnitude of 6.4; the latest major earthquake struck in 1981 with a magnitude of 5.4.

=== Settlements ===
The city of Banja Luka (aside from the city proper) includes the following settlements:

- Agino Selo
- Barlovci
- Bastasi
- Bistrica
- Bočac
- Borkovići
- Bronzani Majdan
- Cerici
- Čokori
- Debeljaci
- Dobrnja
- Dragočaj
- Drakulić
- Dujakovci
- Goleši
- Jagare
- Kmećani
- Kola
- Kola Donja
- Krmine
- Krupa na Vrbasu
- Kuljani
- Lokvari
- Lusići
- Ljubačevo
- Melina
- Motike
- Obrovac
- Pavići
- Pavlovac
- Pervan Donji
- Pervan Gornji
- Piskavica
- Ponir
- Potkozarje
- Prijakovci
- Priječani
- Prnjavor Mali
- Radmanići
- Radosavska
- Ramići
- Rekavice
- Slavićka
- Stratinska
- Stričići
- Subotica
- Šargovac
- Šimići
- Šljivno
- Verići
- Vilusi
- Zalužani
- Zelenci

=== Climate ===
Banja Luka has a moderate humid subtropical climate with mild winters, infrequent frosts, and warm summers. The warmest month of the year is July, with an average temperature of 22.5 °C (72.5 °F). The coldest month of the year is January, when temperatures average around 1.3 °C (34.3 °F).

The annual precipitation for the city is about 1,047.5 mm (41 in). Banja Luka has an average of 104 rainy days a year. Due to the city's relatively high latitude and inland location, it snows in Banja Luka almost every year during the winter period. Strong winds can come from the north and northeast. Sometimes, southern winds bring hot air from the Adriatic Sea. On average the city sees 81 freezing nights per year.

Highest recorded temperature: 41.8 °C (107.2 °F) on 10 August 2017

Lowest recorded temperature: −26.4 °C (−15.5 °F) on 23 January 1963

Climate data for Banja Luka (1991–2020, extremes 1961–present)
| Month | Jan | Feb | Mar | Apr | May | Jun | Jul | Aug | Sep | Oct | Nov | Dec | Year |
|---|---|---|---|---|---|---|---|---|---|---|---|---|---|
| Record high °C (°F) | 22.3 (72.1) | 25.2 (77.4) | 29.0 (84.2) | 32.0 (89.6) | 35.2 (95.4) | 37.9 (100.2) | 41.6 (106.9) | 41.8 (107.2) | 40.2 (104.4) | 30.9 (87.6) | 29.1 (84.4) | 23.2 (73.8) | 41.8 (107.2) |
| Mean daily maximum °C (°F) | 6.1 (43.0) | 8.9 (48.0) | 14.0 (57.2) | 19.0 (66.2) | 23.4 (74.1) | 27.3 (81.1) | 29.5 (85.1) | 29.8 (85.6) | 24.0 (75.2) | 18.6 (65.5) | 12.4 (54.3) | 6.7 (44.1) | 18.3 (65.0) |
| Daily mean °C (°F) | 1.3 (34.3) | 3.0 (37.4) | 7.4 (45.3) | 12.1 (53.8) | 16.7 (62.1) | 20.8 (69.4) | 22.5 (72.5) | 22.1 (71.8) | 16.7 (62.1) | 11.9 (53.4) | 7.1 (44.8) | 2.3 (36.1) | 12.0 (53.6) |
| Mean daily minimum °C (°F) | −2.5 (27.5) | −1.7 (28.9) | 1.8 (35.2) | 5.9 (42.6) | 10.3 (50.5) | 14.2 (57.6) | 15.8 (60.4) | 15.6 (60.1) | 11.3 (52.3) | 7.0 (44.6) | 3.1 (37.6) | −1.2 (29.8) | 6.6 (43.9) |
| Record low °C (°F) | −26.4 (−15.5) | −21.5 (−6.7) | −18.2 (−0.8) | −5.9 (21.4) | −0.4 (31.3) | 0.9 (33.6) | 6.2 (43.2) | 5.6 (42.1) | 0.0 (32.0) | −6.0 (21.2) | −19.7 (−3.5) | −20.4 (−4.7) | −26.4 (−15.5) |
| Average precipitation mm (inches) | 73.3 (2.89) | 68.4 (2.69) | 80.0 (3.15) | 88.9 (3.50) | 104.0 (4.09) | 101.8 (4.01) | 81.0 (3.19) | 75.4 (2.97) | 107.9 (4.25) | 84.8 (3.34) | 90.3 (3.56) | 91.7 (3.61) | 1,047.5 (41.25) |
| Average precipitation days (≥ 1.0 mm) | 9 | 9 | 9.5 | 10.4 | 10.5 | 9.2 | 8.2 | 6.5 | 9 | 8.3 | 9.4 | 10.2 | 109.2 |
| Average relative humidity (%) | 82 | 80 | 73 | 69 | 71 | 71 | 70 | 73 | 78 | 82 | 84 | 83 | 76 |
| Mean monthly sunshine hours | 67.2 | 90 | 140.9 | 175 | 222.7 | 253.7 | 285.9 | 264.6 | 181.6 | 136.3 | 75.1 | 55.3 | 1,948.3 |
| Percentage possible sunshine | 24 | 31 | 38 | 43 | 49 | 55 | 61 | 61 | 49 | 41 | 26 | 20 | 44 |
| Average ultraviolet index | 1 | 2 | 3 | 5 | 7 | 8 | 8 | 7 | 5 | 3 | 2 | 1 | 4 |
Source 1: NOAA NCEI
Source 2: Deutscher Wetterdienst (extremes 1973–2016, humidity, 1973–1991)

== History ==
=== Prehistory and Roman period ===
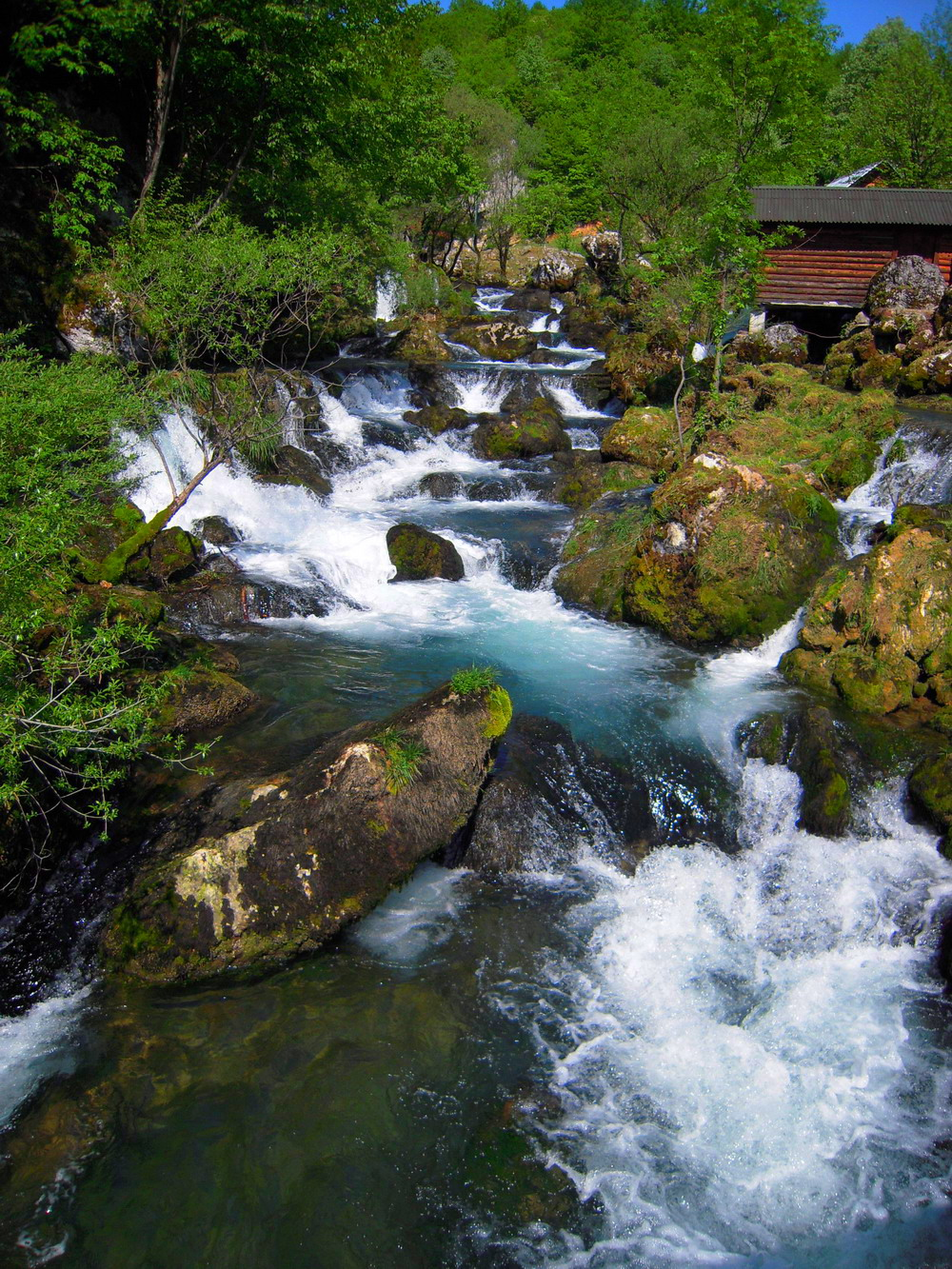
The Vrbas river's left tributary, the Krupa, in a protected area 30 kilometres upstream from the city

Archaeological sites in the city and its surroundings testify to prehistoric human habitation of the area around the Vrbas. Within the Kastel fortress, in the present-day centre of the city, a substantial assemblage of stone tools and weapons was discovered, believed to have been used in the late Paleolithic. At the same site, the remains of a settlement of the Baden culture from the somewhat later period of the Eneolithic (between 2000 and 1800 BC) were identified. Besides the remains of timber-framed houses plastered with clay, ceramic objects typical of that period were found, such as bowls with tall cylindrical necks and ornamentation, as well as conical clay weights, which could have served in fishing or in primitive weaving technology.

The Roman commander Germanicus brought the area of present-day Banja Luka under Roman control at the beginning of the 1st century AD, following the suppression of the Great Illyrian Revolt. A Roman military camp, the fort of Castra (Latin: Castrum Castra), existed at the site of the Kastel fortress beside which a civilian settlement grew. Publius Cornelius Dolabella, governor under emperor Tiberius in the provinces of Illyricum and Dalmatia, built the Salt Road connecting Salona with Servitium near present-day Gradiška around 20 AD. Castra became an important urban settlement on that route. This can be inferred from findings of coinage, ceramics, stone, remains of brick kilns, buildings and tombs from late antiquity in the city and nearby villages. An altar dedicated to Jupiter from the second century was found near the fortress, and is kept in the National Museum of Bosnia and Herzegovina in Sarajevo. The Romans recognised and used the medicinal properties of the thermo-mineral waters at present-day Srpske Toplice, as well as at the springs in the vicinity of the city — Slatina and Laktaši.

=== Middle Ages ===
Slavs settled in the Balkans in the 6th century. Mediaeval fortresses in the vicinity of Banja Luka include Vrbas (1224), Župa Zemljanik (1287), Kotor Varoš (1323), Zvečaj (1404), and Bočac (1446). In one document written by King Vladislav II on 6 February 1494, Juraj Mikulasić was mentioned as castellan of Banja Luka. Below the town was a smaller settlement with one Catholic monastery.

=== Ottoman rule ===
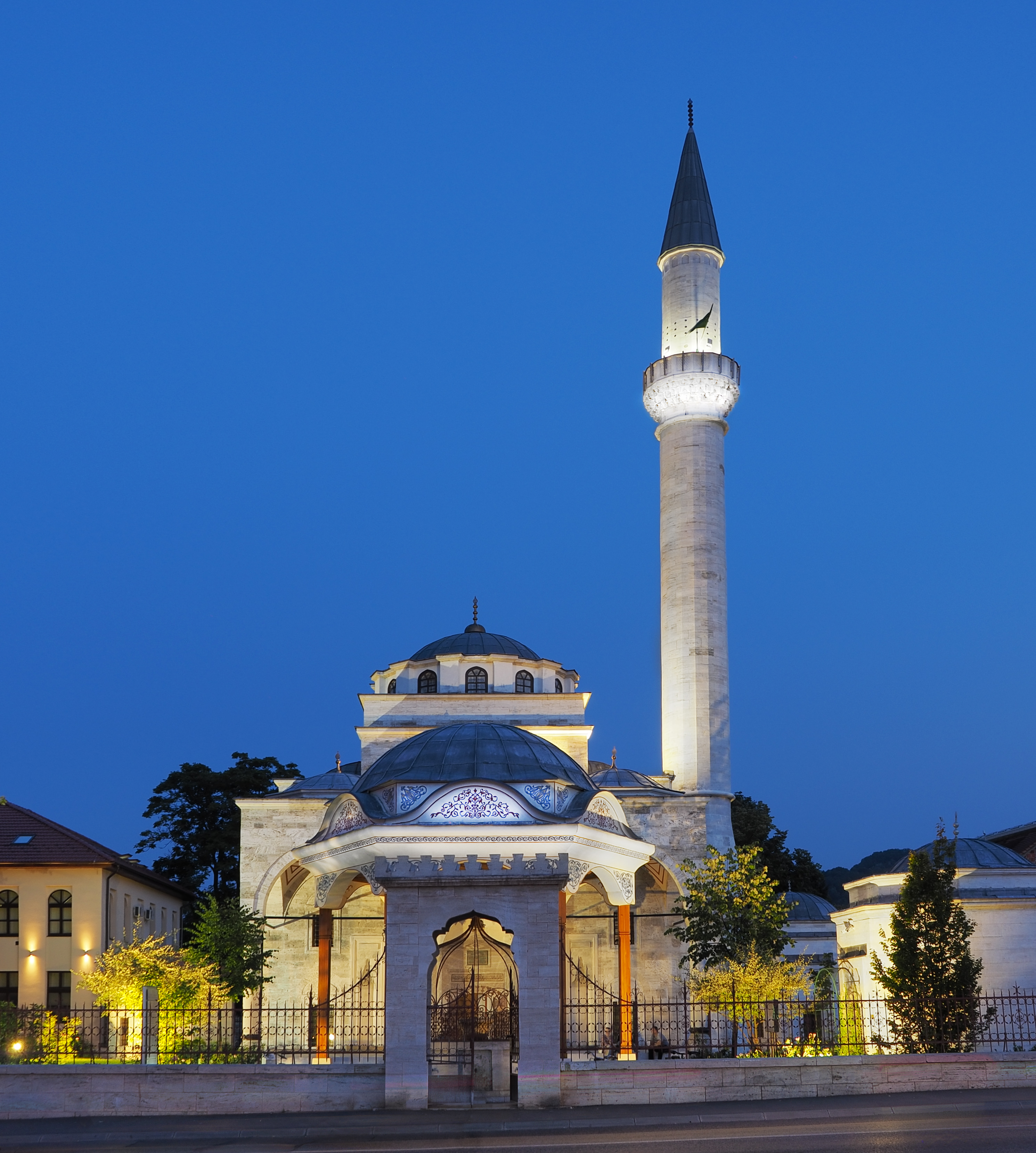
Ferhat Pasha Mosque, also known as the Ferhadija Mosque

Banja Luka fell to the Ottomans in 1528. It became the seat of the Sanjak of Bosnia sometime before 1554, until 1580 when the Bosnia Eyalet was established. (Note: The transfer of the seat of the Sanjak of Bosnia from Sarajevo to Banja Luka is commonly dated to 1553 or 1554.) Bosnian beylerbeys were seated in Banja Luka until 1639. The city developed more rapidly from 1553 onwards; the first sanjak-bey seated in Banja Luka, Sofi Mehmed Pasha, oversaw a sharp increase in commercial activity and had bridges built across the Vrbas and a caravanserai erected. Between 1579 and 1587, Ferhad Pasha Sokolović, a relative of Grand Vizier Sokollu Mehmed Pasha, built a commercial district on land ideally suited for the development of the town, at the mouth of the Crkvena river into the Vrbas. Some 216 public buildings were built at that time, some of which were the Ferhadija and Arnaudija mosques, about 200 artisan and sales shops, and wheat warehouses. During their construction plumbing infrastructure was laid out, which served the surrounding residential areas. This stimulated the economic and urban development of Banja Luka, which soon became one of the leading commercial and political centres in Bosnia. It was also the central sanjak in the Bosnia Eyalet. In 1688, the city was burned down by the Austrian army, but it quickly recovered. Later periodic intrusions by the Austrian army stimulated military developments in Banja Luka, which made it into a strategic military centre.

During the Austro-Turkish wars, Banja Luka was repeatedly devastated and its population killed or dispersed. Of particular significance was the Battle of Banja Luka fought around the town's fortress in 1737, in which both sides suffered heavy losses. Besides military campaigns, the town was ravaged by major epidemics of plague — the largest one coinciding with the 1812–1819 Ottoman plague epidemic — as well as by frequent destructive earthquakes. The period was also marked by Vaso Pelagić, the first headmaster of the Orthodox seminary established in 1866; for the school's needs he printed a guidebook for Serb teachers in Belgrade in 1867, taking holy vows as an archimandrite to shield the seminary from opponents of his progressive curriculum. A Muslim secondary school began operating in 1862. Banja Luka received a telegraph in 1866. The railway line to Banja Luka was ceremonially opened on 14 December 1872 according to some sources, or on 17 January 1873 according to others, when the city also gained a railway station.

In the 19th century, Sephardic Jews and Trappists migrated to the city and contributed to the early industrialization of the region by building mills, breweries, brick factories, textile factories, and other important structures. The Mariastern Abbey built in the 19th century lent its name to the neighbourhood of Trapisti and has left a significant legacy in the area through its Trappist cheese and its beer production. In 1835 and 1836, during Ottoman administration, numerous people from Banja Luka emigrated to Lešnica, Lipnica, and Loznica, the villages around Loznica, and to Šabac.

=== Austro-Hungarian rule ===
In 1878, Banja Luka was occupied by Austria-Hungary. Despite its leading position in the region, Banja Luka as a city was not modernised until the Austro-Hungarian occupation in the late 19th century. Under the new administration the city advanced considerably, gaining new roads, a water supply, sewers and electric lighting. The first electric bulb was lit in 1899, and from 1902 the city itself was supplied with electricity, while industry and trade developed. The first hospital was opened in 1879, the Serbian Reading Room in the former post office building in the same year, a trade school in 1885, a tobacco factory in 1888, a railway station with a direct line to Vienna and Budapest in 1891, the first city savings bank in 1894, the Gymnasium (the "Velika realka") in 1895, and the wood-processing enterprise "Bosna Holz". The first automobile arrived in Banja Luka in 1908, and the city's first cinema, the "Elektro-bioskop", was opened in 1911 by Moritz Gottlieb, a watchmaker and jeweller. The Austro-Hungarian general Alfred von Jelzon initiated a tree-planting campaign in which 4,714 trees had been planted by 1885, giving Banja Luka its recognisable avenues, whose total length then amounted to 17 km (11 mi). One of the most notable citizens of Banja Luka from that period was the writer and popular tribune Petar Kočić, born in nearby Stričići on Mount Manjača, who left a deep and lasting imprint on the cultural and political life of the region and on Serbian literature in general.

==== World War I ====
The outbreak of World War I in Banja Luka was marked by the Banja Luka treason trial of 1915–1916. Following the declaration of war on Serbia, Austro-Hungarian authorities in the city arrested 156 prominent Serbs and charged them with high treason. In the final verdict handed down in 1916, 16 men were sentenced to death and 87 received prison terms. The death sentences were commuted following the intervention of Alfonso XIII of Spain, who acted through the intercession of his mother, Maria Christina of Austria, who had close ties to the Viennese imperial court. Banja Luka still has a street in the city centre named after him.

Austro-Hungarian rule in Banja Luka ended with the entry of the Serbian army into the city on 21 November 1918.

=== Yugoslavia ===
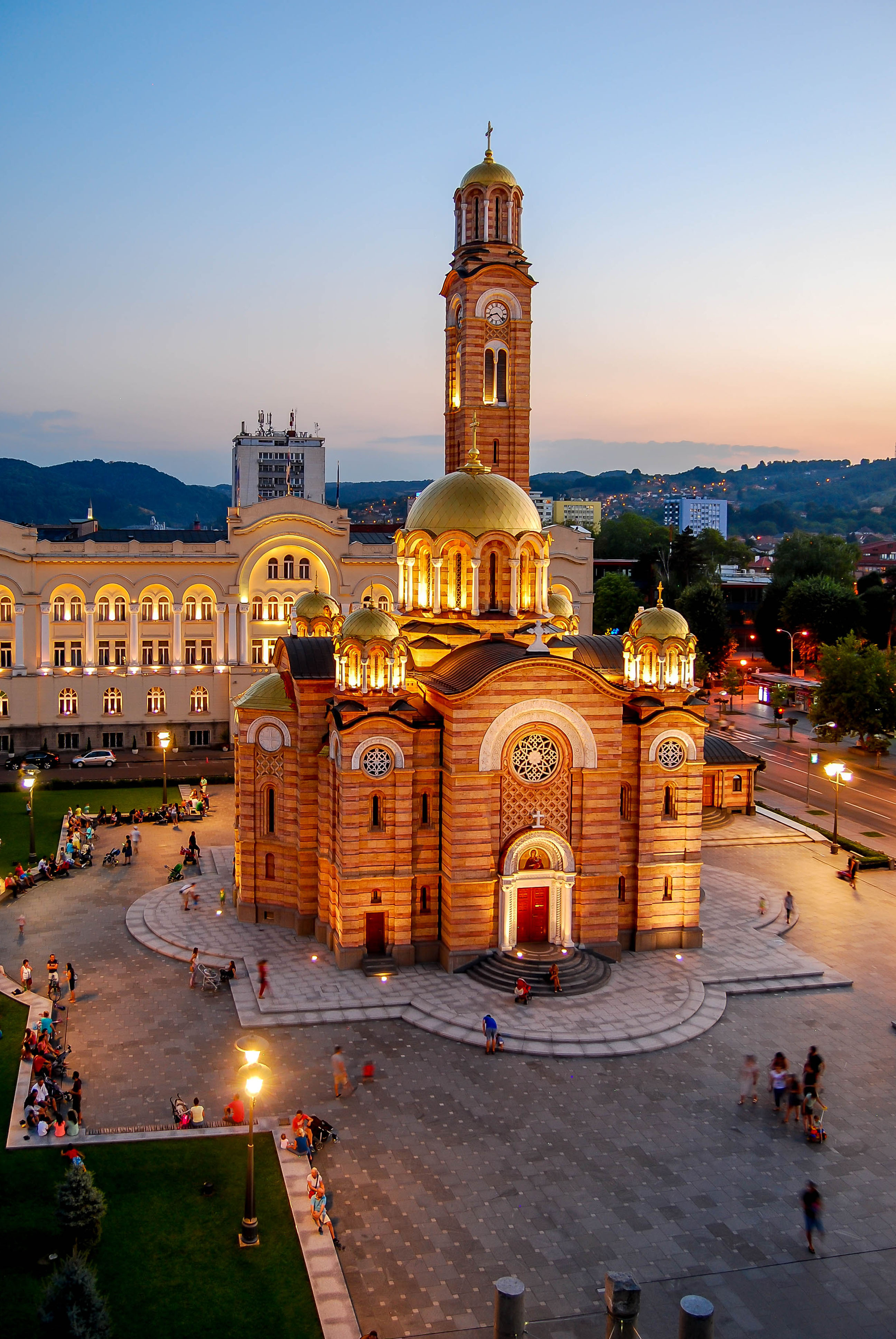
Cathedral of Christ the Saviour, built in 1929

After World War I, the town became the capital of the Vrbas Banovina, a province of the Kingdom of Yugoslavia. The first Ban of the Vrbas Banovina was Svetislav Milosavljević. Under his administration the city gained a thermal power plant at Lauš (1923), the Hygiene Institute (established 1929), a concrete city bridge (1930), the building of the city administration (1931), Banski dvor (1932), the Hotel Palas (1933), the mortgage bank — today's Palace of the Republic (1936), the 'Sokolski dom' (consecrated in 1937), the National Theatre of the Vrbas Banovina (1930), a music pavilion, and the first public telephone booth (1937). By one contemporary press account, 700 new buildings had been built by 1937 at an estimated cost of half a billion Yugoslav dinars. The Serbian Orthodox Church of the Holy Trinity, consecrated on Ascension Day, 18 May 1939, was destroyed in the German bombing of the city; it has been rebuilt as the present-day Cathedral of Christ the Saviour. A large number of new schools were opened (the Lower Agricultural School, 1923), the Ethnographic Museum of the Vrbas Banovina was founded (1930), the City Park was built, along with a new city bridge (the Patras bridge), one of the early projects of engineer Branko Žeželj. In architecture, with the exception of religious buildings, modern architecture and the Bauhaus style were increasingly applied, although Neo-Renaissance, classicism and secession were still present.

==== World War II ====
During World War II, Banja Luka was occupied by Axis troops and was included in the Independent State of Croatia (NDH), a Nazi puppet-state led by Ante Pavelić's Ustaše. The city was devastated during the German bombing of 9 April 1941, with further damage caused by the Allied bombing in 1944. Most of Banja Luka's Serbs and Jews were deported to concentration camps such as Jasenovac and Stara Gradiška. The Jasenovac camp was one of the largest extermination camps in Europe, which was notorious for its high mortality rate and the barbaric practices that occurred in it.

In April 1941, following the establishment of the NDH, Ustaše leader Ante Pavelić placed Viktor Gutić in charge of the territory of the former Vrbas Banovina. Gutić initiated a campaign of Croatianizing Banja Luka — banning the Cyrillic script, prohibiting Serbs and Jews from using public transport, and initiating a series of massacres targeting the Serb population. The city's Cathedral of Christ the Saviour and Orthodox church of the Holy Trinity were totally demolished by the Ustaše, as was the Church of St. George in Petrićevac. The Bishop of Banja Luka, Platon Jovanović, was arrested by the Ustaše on 5 May 1941 and was tortured and killed afterwards. His body was thrown into the Vrbanja river.

On 7 February 1942, Ustaše paramilitaries, led by Franciscan friar Miroslav Filipović, killed several thousand Serbs, among them about 500 children, in Drakulić, Motike, and Šargovac — a massacre whose death toll is estimated at between about 2,300 and 2,500 victims.

The city was liberated by the Yugoslav Partisans on 22 April 1945. In 1961, a monument to the fallen fighters of Bosnian Krajina was erected on the nearby Banj brdo in memory of several thousand Krajina fighters killed in World War II.

==== 1969 earthquake ====
On 26 and 27 October 1969, two devastating earthquakes (6.0 and 6.4 on the Richter scale) damaged many buildings in Banja Luka. The foreshock struck during the night of 26 October at 2:55, with trembling continuing until 8:53 on 27 October, when the main earthquake struck the city with an epicentre in the very centre of town — at the site of today's "Boska" department store. Around 20 to 23 people were killed, and over a thousand were injured. Timely evacuation measures limited the loss of life, while material damage was enormous: altogether 112 industrial organizations, 36,267 dwellings, 131 school buildings and all buildings of culture, social protection and public services were damaged, and the medical centre was destroyed. A large building called Titanik in the centre of town was completely destroyed, and the area was later turned into a central public square. With contributions from all over Yugoslavia, Banja Luka was repaired and rebuilt, and a time of great reconstruction followed, with numerous new buildings and housing estates constructed. During this period, a large Serb population moved to the city from the surrounding villages and from more distant areas in Herzegovina.

=== Bosnian War ===
Even though there were no open hostilities between the warring sides in Banja Luka, the city's Bosniak and Croat populations were systematically intimidated, harassed and tortured; their property was seized; and the city was ethnically cleansed of its non-Serb population.

From 22 May to 19 June 1992, twelve newborns died in the paediatric clinic in Banja Luka, all of them dependent on oxygen for incubators. Because the corridor through Posavina towards Serbia had been severed by the fighting, the overland delivery of oxygen — by which Banja Luka had previously been supplied — was impossible, while the flight ban over Bosnia prevented an airlift. An aircraft with oxygen cylinders waited at Batajnica Airport for several days for special clearance from the United Nations Security Council; despite repeated appeals, the clearance never came.

In the course of 1993, most of Banja Luka's mosques, among them the Ferhadija and the Arnaudija, were destroyed by explosives, as were Catholic churches in the wider area. In its decision in the case The Islamic Community in Bosnia and Herzegovina v. Republika Srpska (CH/96/29), the Human Rights Chamber for Bosnia and Herzegovina found that fifteen mosques had been destroyed in Banja Luka in 1993.

On 7 May 2001, an attempt to lay the cornerstone for the reconstruction of the Ferhadija mosque was interrupted by unrest, when the gathered crowd attacked the assembled worshippers, officials and representatives of the international community; several people were injured, and Murat Badić later died of his injuries. No similar incidents occurred at subsequent events of this kind in Banja Luka, and in the years that followed all destroyed religious buildings were rebuilt.

==== 1994 Banja Luka incident ====
On 28 February 1994, an incident occurred in which four Republika Srpska Air Force aircraft, which had violated Bosnia's no-fly zone and bombed a factory, were shot down southwest of Banja Luka by planes from the United States Air Force on behalf of NATO, marking the first active combat action in the alliance's history.

== Demographics ==
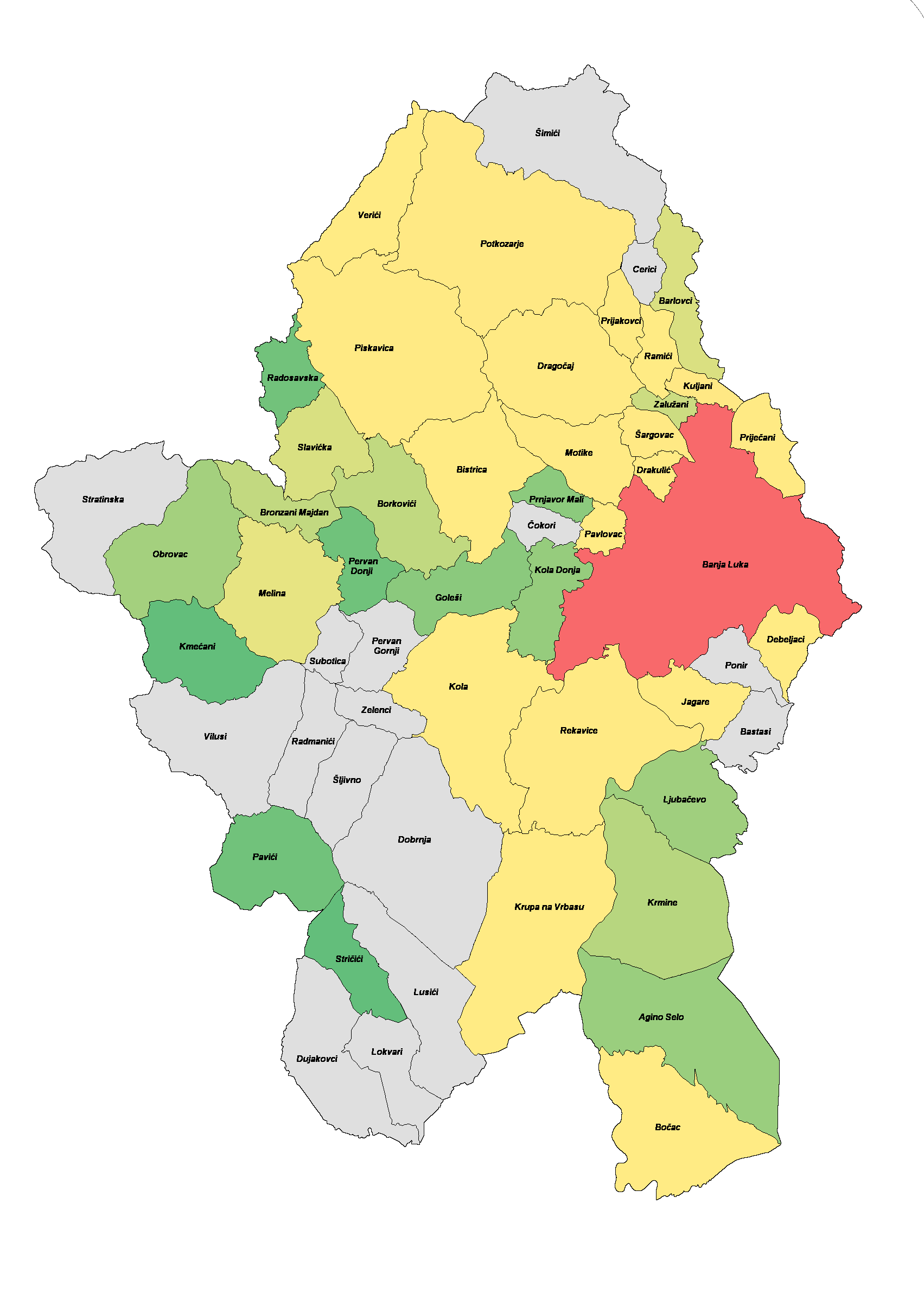
Banja Luka municipality by population proportional to the settlement with the highest and lowest population

The 2013 census in Bosnia indicated a population of 185,042, overwhelmingly Serbs.

=== Population ===
Total population by year
| | 1879 | 1885 | 1895 | 1910 | 1921 | 1931 | 1948 | 1953 | 1961 | 1971 | 1981 | 1991 | 2013 |
|---|---|---|---|---|---|---|---|---|---|---|---|---|---|
| Total | 86,209 | 62,733 | 61,051 | 73,160 | 77,579 | 98,002 | 120,471 | 138,180 | 75,910 | 158,736 | 183,618 | 195,692 | 185,042 |
| Banja Luka | 9,560 | 11,357 | 14,812 | 14,800 | 18,001 | 22,165 | 31,223 | 38,135 | 50,650 | 90,831 | 123,937 | 143,079 | 138,963 |

Settlement population by year (Note: Data for censuses prior to 1971 are not shown, due to changes in municipal organisation.)
| Settlement | 1971 | 1981 | 1991 | 2013 |
|---|---|---|---|---|
| Total | 158,736 | 183,618 | 195,692 | 185,042 |
| Agino Selo | 1,504 | 1,352 | 1,106 | 453 |
| Banja Luka | 90,831 | 123,937 | 143,079 | 138,963 |
| Barlovci | 651 | 727 | 624 | 711 |
| Bastasi | 737 | 675 | 493 | 165 |
| Bistrica | 2,563 | 2,104 | 1,703 | 1,386 |
| Bočac | 2,395 | 2,232 | 1,685 | 864 |
| Borkovići | 1,465 | 1,223 | 976 | 594 |
| Bronzani Majdan | 901 | 1,112 | 1,019 | 614 |
| Cerici | 541 | 212 | 169 | 16 |
| Čokori | 336 | 268 | 182 | 199 |
| Debeljaci | 1,006 | 993 | 1,073 | 1,219 |
| Dobrnja | 342 | 189 | 130 | 74 |
| Dragočaj | 2,728 | 2,553 | 2,578 | 2,371 |
| Drakulić | 281 | 308 | 319 | 1,282 |
| Dujakovci | 745 | 467 | 330 | 125 |
| Goleši | 1,348 | 1,040 | 827 | 372 |
| Jagare | 1,259 | 1,273 | 1,269 | 1,330 |
| Kmećani | 779 | 653 | 458 | 218 |
| Kola | 2,957 | 2,694 | 2,241 | 1,249 |
| Kola Donja | 1,049 | 875 | 757 | 417 |
| Krmine | 1,517 | 1,259 | 980 | 557 |
| Krupa na Vrbasu | 2,490 | 2,133 | 1,858 | 1,239 |
| Kuljani | 863 | 1,117 | 1,207 | 4,165 |
| Lokvari | 465 | 365 | 325 | 127 |
| Lusići | 541 | 446 | 339 | 112 |
| Ljubačevo | 818 | 746 | 663 | 463 |
| Melina | 1,940 | 1,485 | 1,260 | 777 |
| Motike | 1,500 | 1,830 | 2,009 | 2,515 |
| Obrovac | 1,345 | 1,259 | 1,046 | 482 |
| Pavići | 1,038 | 790 | 607 | 269 |
| Pavlovac | 663 | 772 | 1,522 | 1,851 |
| Pervan Donji | 876 | 802 | 672 | 272 |
| Pervan Gornji | 820 | 644 | 467 | 195 |
| Piskavica | 4,905 | 4,393 | 3,798 | 2,673 |
| Ponir | 240 | 109 | 60 | 14 |
| Potkozarje (formerly Ivanjska) | 5,062 | 4,953 | 4,577 | 3,067 |
| Prijakovci | 644 | 582 | 576 | 846 |
| Priječani | 825 | 877 | 840 | 2,034 |
| Prnjavor Mali | 425 | 350 | 309 | 379 |
| Radmanići | 934 | 0 | 0 | 0 |
| Radosavska | 861 | 734 | 514 | 273 |
| Ramići | 903 | 1,015 | 1,035 | 1,757 |
| Rekavice | 3,686 | 3,115 | 2,679 | 2,156 |
| Slavićka | 1,444 | 1,268 | 985 | 720 |
| Stratinska | 1,264 | 1,034 | 730 | 199 |
| Stričići | 747 | 648 | 464 | 209 |
| Subotica | 248 | 215 | 163 | 63 |
| Šargovac | 994 | 1,171 | 1,313 | 3,079 |
| Šimići | 2,532 | 2000 | 1,516 | 43 |
| Šljivno | 106 | 0 | 0 | 0 |
| Verići | 1,437 | 1,326 | 1,237 | 1,061 |
| Vilusi | 1,478 | 489 | 239 | 130 |
| Zalužani | 396 | 622 | 561 | 637 |
| Zelenci | 311 | 182 | 123 | 56 |

Ethnic composition – Urban (Note: Census data prior to 1948 are not shown, as religion was used as the classification criterion instead of ethnicity.)
| Ethnic group | 1948 | 1953 | 1961 | 1971 | 1981 | 1991 | 2013 |
|---|---|---|---|---|---|---|---|
| Total | 31,223 (100%) | 38,135 (100%) | 50,650 (100%) | 90,831 (100%) | 123,937 (100%) | 143,079 (100%) | 138,963 (100%) |
| Serbs | 10,861 (34.78%) | 15,299 (40.12%) | 22,883 (45.18%) | 41,297 (45.47%) | 51,839 (41.83%) | 70,155 (49.03%) | 121,185 (87.21%) |
| Muslims/Bosniaks | 9,951 (31.87%) | 9,800 (25.70%) | 6,504 (12.84%) | 23,411 (25.77%) | 20,916 (16.88%) | 27,689 (19.35%) | 7,573 (5.45%) |
| Croats | 8,662 (27.74%) | 10,810 (28.35%) | 12,072 (23.83%) | 17,897 (19.70%) | 16,314 (13.16%) | 15,700 (10.97%) | 4,205 (3.03%) |
| Undeclared | | | | | | | 2,520 (1.81%) |
| Others | 176 (0.56%) | | 877 (1.73%) | 1,913 (2.11%) | 2,496 (2.01%) | 6,890 (4.82%) | 1,418 (1.02%) |
| Yugoslavs | | | 6,848 (13.52%) | 4,606 (5.07%) | 30,318 (24.46%) | 22,645 (15.83%) | 615 (0.44%) |
| Ukrainians | | | | | | | 396 (0.29%) |
| Montenegrins | 91 (0.29%) | 399 (1.04%) | 515 (1.02%) | 600 (0.66%) | 695 (0.56%) | | 321 (0.23%) |
| Unknown | | | | | | | 232 (0.17%) |
| Slovenes | 577 (1.85%) | 663 (1.74%) | 666 (1.31%) | 636 (0.70%) | 456 (0.37%) | | 215 (0.15%) |
| Roma | 74 (0.24%) | | 2 (0.01%) | 59 (0.07%) | 499 (0.40%) | | 129 (0.09%) |
| Macedonians | 37 (0.12%) | 131 (0.34%) | 156 (0.31%) | 177 (0.19%) | 172 (0.14%) | | 126 (0.09%) |
| Albanians | 28 (0.09%) | | 61 (0.12%) | 134 (0.15%) | 158 (0.13%) | | 28 (0.02%) |
| Hungarians | 46 (0.15%) | | 66 (0.13%) | 101 (0.11%) | 74 (0.06%) | | |
| Rusyns/Ukrainians | 362 (1.16%) | 395 (1.03%) | | | | | |
| Poles | | 122 (0.32%) | | | | | |
| Czechs | 148 (0.47%) | 110 (0.29%) | | | | | |
| Russians | 98 (0.31%) | 84 (0.22%) | | | | | |
| Other Slavs | | 33 (0.09%) | | | | | |
| Other non-Slavs | | 289 (0.76%) | | | | | |
| Italians | 74 (0.24%) | | | | | | |
| Germans | 26 (0.08%) | | | | | | |
| Slovaks | 5 (0.02%) | | | | | | |
| Bulgarians | 4 (0.01%) | | | | | | |
| Romanians | 2 (0.01%) | | | | | | |
| Turks | 1 (0.01%) | | | | | | |

Ethnic composition – City
| Ethnic group | 1948 | 1953 | 1961 | 1971 | 1981 | 1991 | 2013 |
|---|---|---|---|---|---|---|---|
| Total | 120,471 (100%) | 138,180 (100%) | 75,910 (100%) | 158,736 (100%) | 183,618 (100%) | 195,692 (100%) | 185,042 (100%) |
| Serbs | 75,460 (62.64%) | 89,734 (64.94%) | 36,626 (48.25%) | 92,465 (58.25%) | 93,389 (50.86%) | 106,826 (54.59%) | 165,750 (89.57%) |
| Muslims/Bosniaks | 12,573 (10.43%) | 12,676 (9.17%) | 7,872 (10.37%) | 24,268 (15.29%) | 21,726 (11.83%) | 28,558 (14.59%) | 7,681 (4.15%) |
| Croats | 29,812 (24.74%) | 32,467 (23.50%) | 20,991 (27.65%) | 33,371 (21.02%) | 30,442 (16.58%) | 29,026 (14.83%) | 5,104 (2.76%) |
| Undeclared | | | | | | | 2,733 (1.48%) |
| Others | 356 (0.29%) | | 1,007 (1.32%) | 2,173 (1.37%) | 3,294 (1.80%) | 7,626 (3.90%) | 1,521 (0.82%) |
| Yugoslavs | | | 7,757 (10.22%) | 4,684 (2.95%) | 32,624 (17.77%) | 23,656 (12.09%) | 648 (0.35%) |
| Ukrainians | | | | | | | 413 (0.22%) |
| Montenegrins | 105 (0.09%) | 433 (0.31%) | 527 (0.69%) | 612 (0.39%) | 715 (0.39%) | | 335 (0.18%) |
| Unknown | | | | | | | 337 (0.18%) |
| Slovenes | 808 (0.67%) | 965 (0.70%) | 833 (1.10%) | 685 (0.43%) | 495 (0.27%) | | 230 (0.13%) |
| Roma | 74 (0.06%) | | 2 (0.01%) | 59 (0.04%) | 503 (0.27%) | | 132 (0.07%) |
| Macedonians | 37 (0.03%) | 146 (0.11%) | 159 (0.21%) | 178 (0.11%) | 189 (0.10%) | | 130 (0.07%) |
| Albanians | 28 (0.02%) | | 68 (0.09%) | 139 (0.09%) | 165 (0.09%) | | 28 (0.02%) |
| Hungarians | 47 (0.04%) | | 68 (0.09%) | 102 (0.06%) | 76 (0.04%) | | |
| Rusyns/Ukrainians | 669 (0.55%) | 733 (0.53%) | | | | | |
| Poles | | 240 (0.17%) | | | | | |
| Czechs | 171 (0.14%) | 125 (0.09%) | | | | | |
| Russians | 111 (0.09%) | 95 (0.07%) | | | | | |
| Other Slavs | | 50 (0.04%) | | | | | |
| Other non-Slavs | | 516 (0.37%) | | | | | |
| Italians | 165 (0.14%) | | | | | | |
| Germans | 34 (0.03%) | | | | | | |
| Slovaks | 7 (0.01%) | | | | | | |
| Bulgarians | 4 (0.01%) | | | | | | |
| Romanians | 9 (0.01%) | | | | | | |
| Turks | 1 (0.01%) | | | | | | |

== Government ==
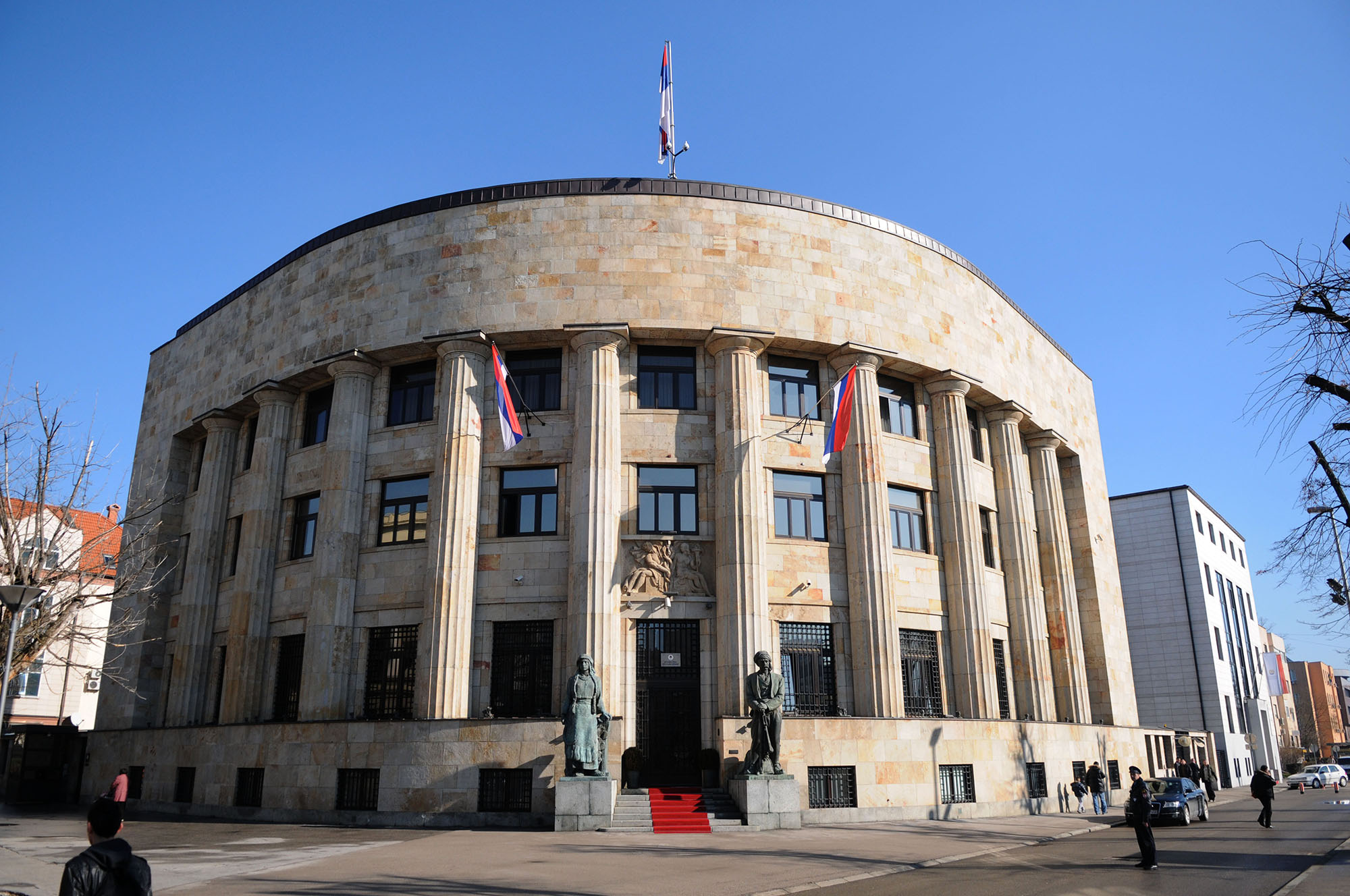
Palace of the Republic, official residence of the president of Republika Srpska

A number of entity and state institutions are seated in the city. The Government of Republika Srpska and its National Assembly are based in Banja Luka. In 2007, the Administrative Center of the Government of Republika Srpska was ceremonially opened in Banja Luka.

The Bosnia and Herzegovina State Agencies based in the city include the Indirect Taxation Authority, the Deposit Insurance Agency, as well as a branch of the Central Bank of Bosnia and Herzegovina (formerly the National Bank of Republika Srpska). Austria, Croatia, France, Germany, Serbia, the United Kingdom, and the United States maintain diplomatic representation through consulates-general in Banja Luka.

As of 2021, the mayor of the city is Draško Stanivuković of the Party of Democratic Progress, who was elected in 2020.

== Economy ==
Office building of the Central Bank of Bosnia and Herzegovina in Banja Luka

In 1981, Banja Luka's GDP per capita was 97% of the Yugoslav average.

Although the city itself was not directly affected by the Bosnian war in the early 1990s, its economy was. During this period, Banja Luka fell behind the world in key areas such as technology, with socially owned technology firms such as SOUR Rudi Čajavec collapsing, resulting in a rather stagnant economy. However, in recent years, the financial services sector has gained in importance in the city. In 2002, trading began on the newly established Banja Luka Stock Exchange. The number of companies listed, the trading volume, and the number of investors have increased significantly. A number of big companies, such as Telekom Srpske, Rafinerija ulja Modriča, Banjalučka Pivara, and Vitaminka, are all listed on the exchange and are traded regularly. Investors, apart from those from Slovenia, Croatia, and Serbia, now include a number of investment funds from the EU, and from Norway, the United States, Japan, and China.

Numerous financial services regulators, such as the Republika Srpska Securities Commission and the Banking Agency of Republika Srpska, are headquartered in Banja Luka. This, along with the fact that some of the major banks in Bosnia and the Insurance Agency of Republika Srpska are all based in the city, has helped Banja Luka establish itself as a major financial centre in the country.

Summary of registered people employed in legal entities per their core activity (as of 2024)
| Sections of economic activity according to KD BiH 2010 | Male | Female | Total | Percentage (%) |
|---|---|---|---|---|
| Agriculture, forestry and fishing | 378 | 172 | 550 | 0.68% |
| Mining and quarrying | 76 | 12 | 88 | 0.11% |
| Manufacturing | 4,712 | 3,252 | 7,964 | 9.87% |
| Electricity, gas, steam and air-conditioning supply | 735 | 309 | 1,044 | 1.29% |
| Water supply; sewerage, waste management and remediation activities | 538 | 168 | 706 | 0.88% |
| Construction | 3,392 | 635 | 4,027 | 4.99% |
| Wholesale and retail trade; repair of motor vehicles and motorcycles | 6,588 | 7,398 | 13,986 | 17.34% |
| Transportation and storage | 2,304 | 887 | 3,191 | 3.96% |
| Accommodation and food service activities | 1,992 | 1,816 | 3,808 | 4.72% |
| Information and communication | 3,380 | 2,508 | 5,888 | 7.30% |
| Financial and insurance activities | 1,456 | 2,472 | 3,928 | 4.87% |
| Real estate activities | 141 | 137 | 278 | 0.34% |
| Professional, scientific and technical activities | 2,580 | 2,000 | 4,580 | 5.68% |
| Administrative and support service activities | 1,678 | 936 | 2,614 | 3.24% |
| Public administration and defence; compulsory social security | 4,914 | 5,064 | 9,978 | 12.37% |
| Education | 1,611 | 4,243 | 5,854 | 7.26% |
| Human health and social work activities | 2,017 | 5,571 | 7,588 | 9.41% |
| Arts, entertainment and recreation | 894 | 1,601 | 2,495 | 3.09% |
| Other service activities | 608 | 1,481 | 2,089 | 2.59% |
| Total | 39,994 | 40,662 | 80,656 | 100.00% |

== Architecture ==
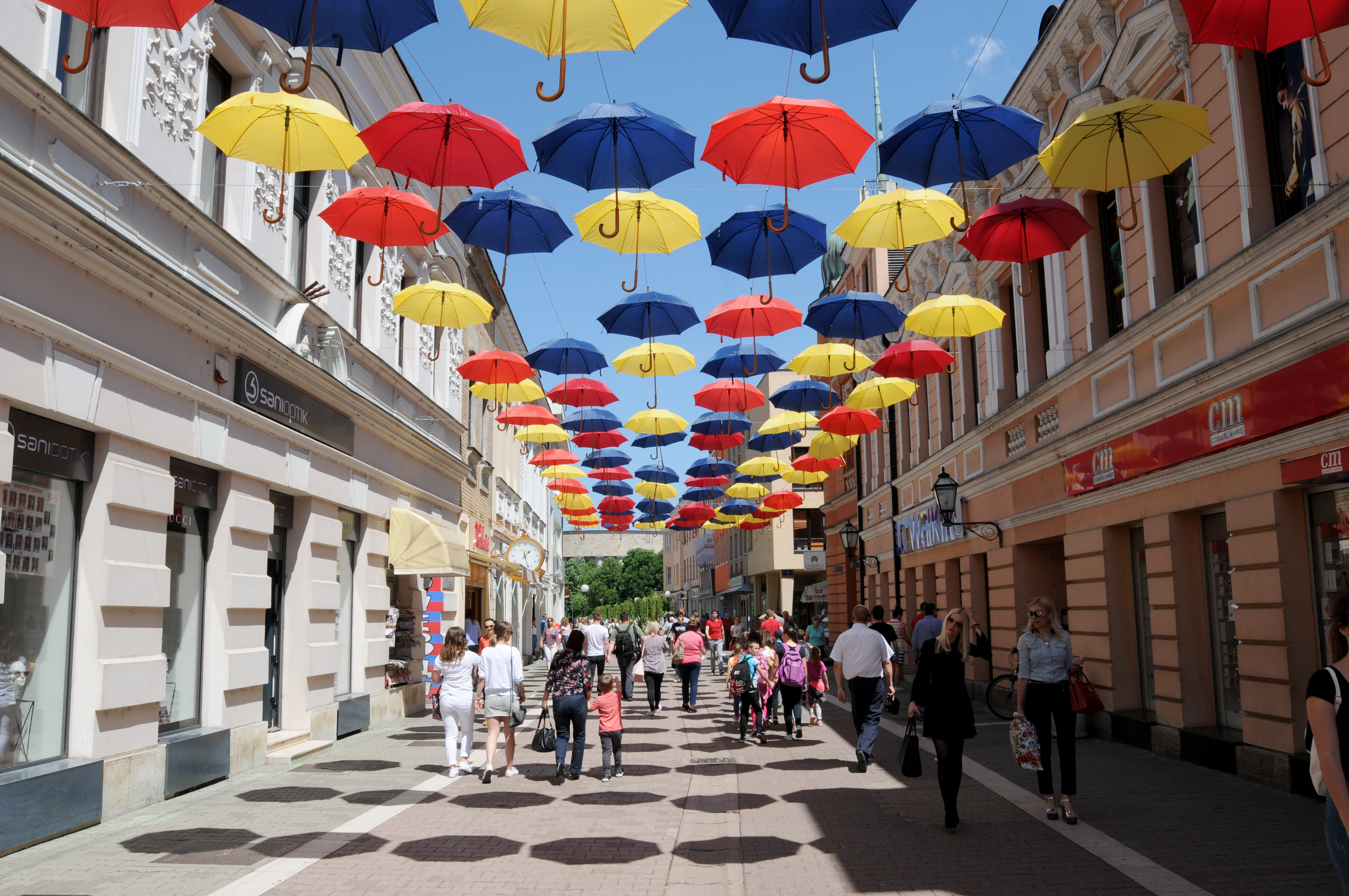
Gospodska street, the main pedestrian street

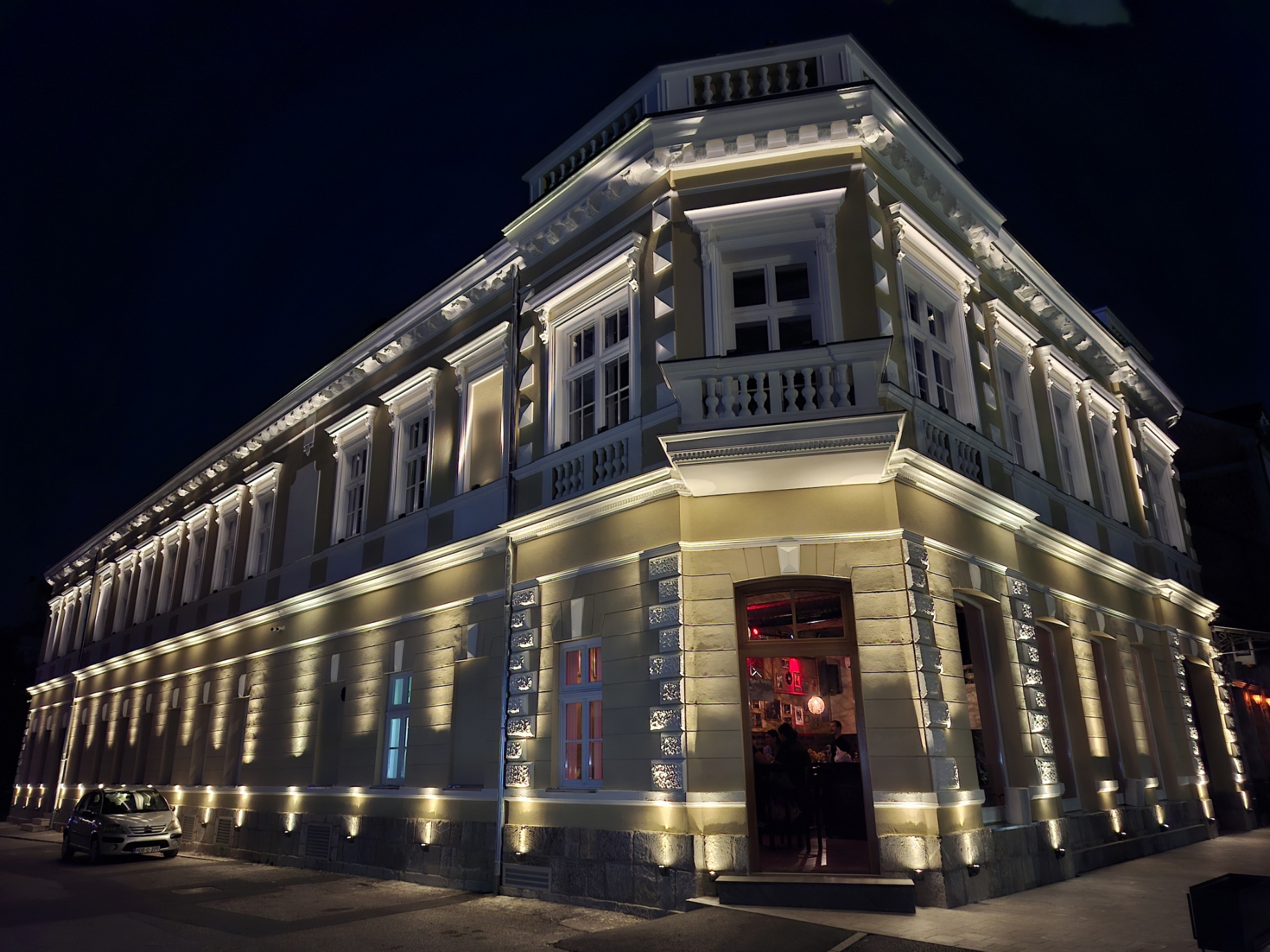
The Milanović House, built in 1893

The oldest buildings in Banja Luka that have retained their authentic appearance date from the period of the Ottoman Empire, when the town existed as a Turkish fortress, military camp and kasaba — a settlement existing for strategic reasons, without the genuine tradition of a European city. Rapid urban and architectural development began with the strengthening of the Christian bourgeois stratum at the juncture of Ottoman and Austro-Hungarian rule in the 19th century. Buildings from the Austro-Hungarian period gave Banja Luka the appearance of a European city, both in the general urban concept and in architectural and stylistic forms.

Some of the best-known buildings from that period are located in the main pedestrian street (Gospodska street / Veselin Masleša street) and the old railway station of 1891, today housing the Museum of Modern Art of Republika Srpska. In the late 19th century a row of single-storey neo-Renaissance buildings was raised along the street, later joined by a building with stylistic elements of the Secession, intended for commercial and residential use. Many of these survive to the present day, and with their rich ornaments on the cornices around windows and balconies, and decorative corner turrets, they form a representative pedestrian zone in the centre of the city. The old railway station has a prominent central entrance and side wings bearing representative portals with arcuated openings framed by richly decorated archivolts, emphasized profiled cornices and a balanced rhythm of rectangular upper-floor windows; its platform side originally carried a porch on steel columns with ornamental capitals. It was built in a neo-Renaissance style, and its position enabled the formation of the first city square tied to the imperial road.

The urban structure formed during the Austro-Hungarian period served as the basis for the city's further development during the Vrbas Banovina period, when new architectural expressions prevailed, drawing on elements of mediaeval Serbian building traditions and the spirit of functionalism. The most notable representative public buildings of this period are the city administration building and Banski dvor, the Palace of the Republic (the former Mortgage Bank), and the building of the National Theatre of Republika Srpska. Construction of Banski dvor began in March 1931, and the building was ceremonially opened on 8 November 1932. Its architectural composition combines classicism with elements of mediaeval Serbian building, expressed through freestanding, projecting pilasters, decoratively carved capitals and archivolts framing semi-circular openings.

The Mortgage Bank building was erected in 1936, combining Bauhaus and neoclassical elements; the two bronze figures of Krajina peasants flanking the main portal are the work of Vladimir Zagorodnjuk. Since the end of April 2008 the building has served as the seat of the President of Republika Srpska, and at the end of May of the same year it was renamed the Palace of the Republic.

On land granted by the municipal government, a building was erected between August 1933 and September 1934 to the design of engineer Josif Goldner. Initially called the Home of King Peter I the Great Liberator, today it is the seat of the National Theatre of Republika Srpska. It originally also housed a museum, the "Zmijanje" society and, from 1935, the King Peter I National Library. Stylistically defined by elements of the Bauhaus while retaining some traits of neoclassicism, the theatre building completed the urban core designed by Ban Milosavljević.

=== Religious buildings ===
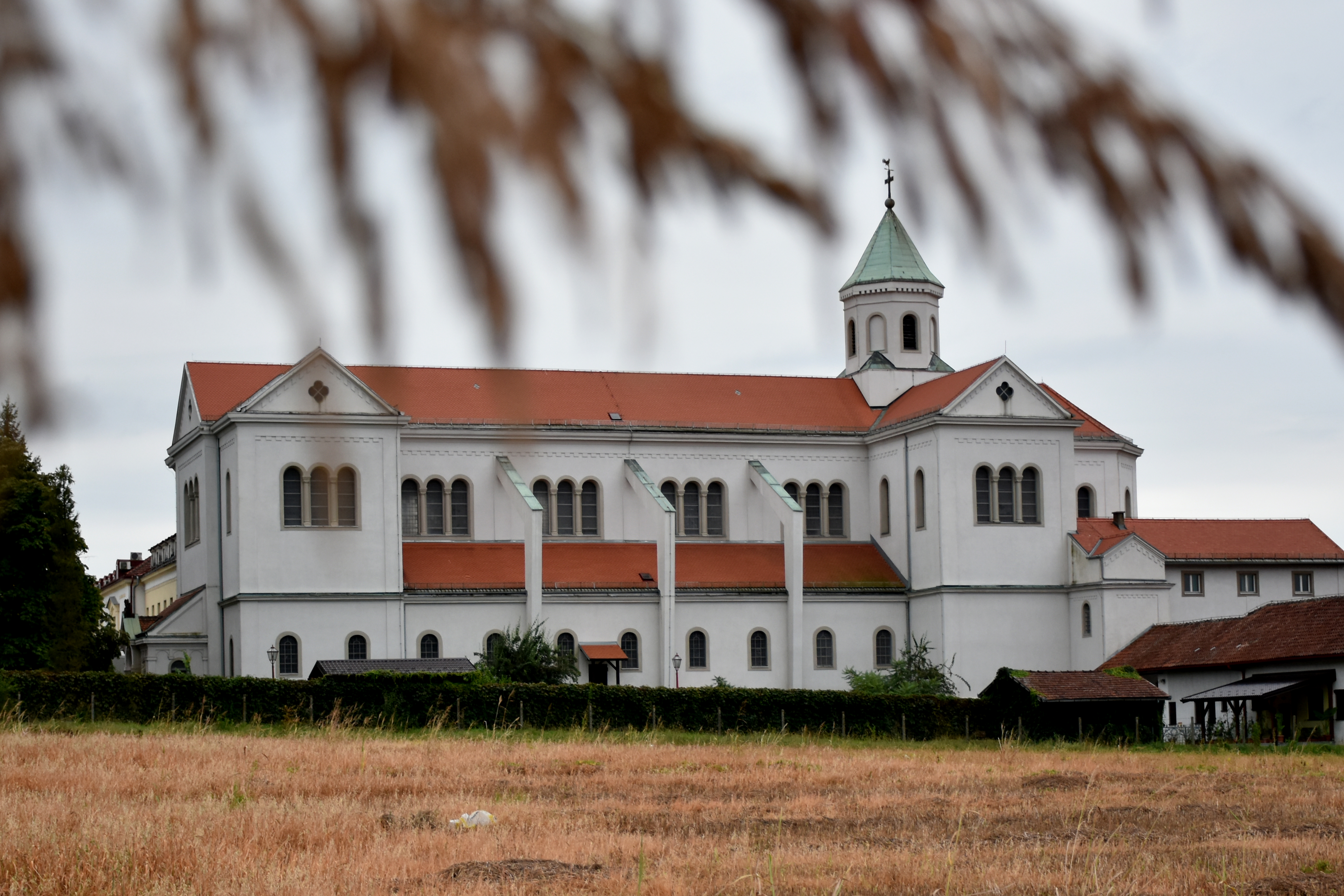
Mariastern Abbey, the only Trappist monastery in Southeastern Europe

The majority of religious buildings in Banja Luka belong to the Serbian Orthodox Church, the Islamic Community in Bosnia and Herzegovina and the Catholic Church; the seats of the Eparchy, the Diocese and the Muftiate of Banja Luka are all located in the city. Before World War II, Banja Luka also had two synagogues (Sephardi and Ashkenazi), as well as one Evangelical church. The Orthodox churches in the city were razed during World War II, while mosques and some Catholic churches were destroyed during the war in Bosnia; most have been rebuilt or their reconstruction is under way.

Most of the city's mosques were built in the 16th and 17th centuries, the best known among them the Ferhat Pasha Mosque (Ferhadija). The most significant Orthodox church in Banja Luka is the Cathedral of Christ the Saviour, while among the Roman Catholic sacred buildings, the Mariastern Abbey was of great importance both to the faithful and to the development of Banja Luka and its surroundings.

The Cathedral of Christ the Saviour was built in the Serbo-Byzantine style, which entered architectural practice in the Balkans at the end of the 19th and beginning of the 20th century. It was destroyed in World War II, and its reconstruction began only in 1992. The church is built out of travertine, and its portals, rose windows, columns, crosses, bifora and archivolts are made out of white Carrara marble.

The Ferhat Pasha Mosque, or Ferhadija, was built in 1579 in the classical Ottoman style. Damaged and renovated many times over its long history, it suffered its most serious damage in the 1969 earthquake, when its minaret was broken; it was then thoroughly restored and painted. During the Bosnian war it was completely demolished along with the city's other mosques. It was rebuilt and ceremonially reopened in May 2016.

The Mariastern Abbey was founded in 1869. Early Christian and Romanesque elements shape the vast space of the triple-naved basilica in a deliberate, original manner, the central nave being sixty metres long and ten metres wide.

== Culture ==
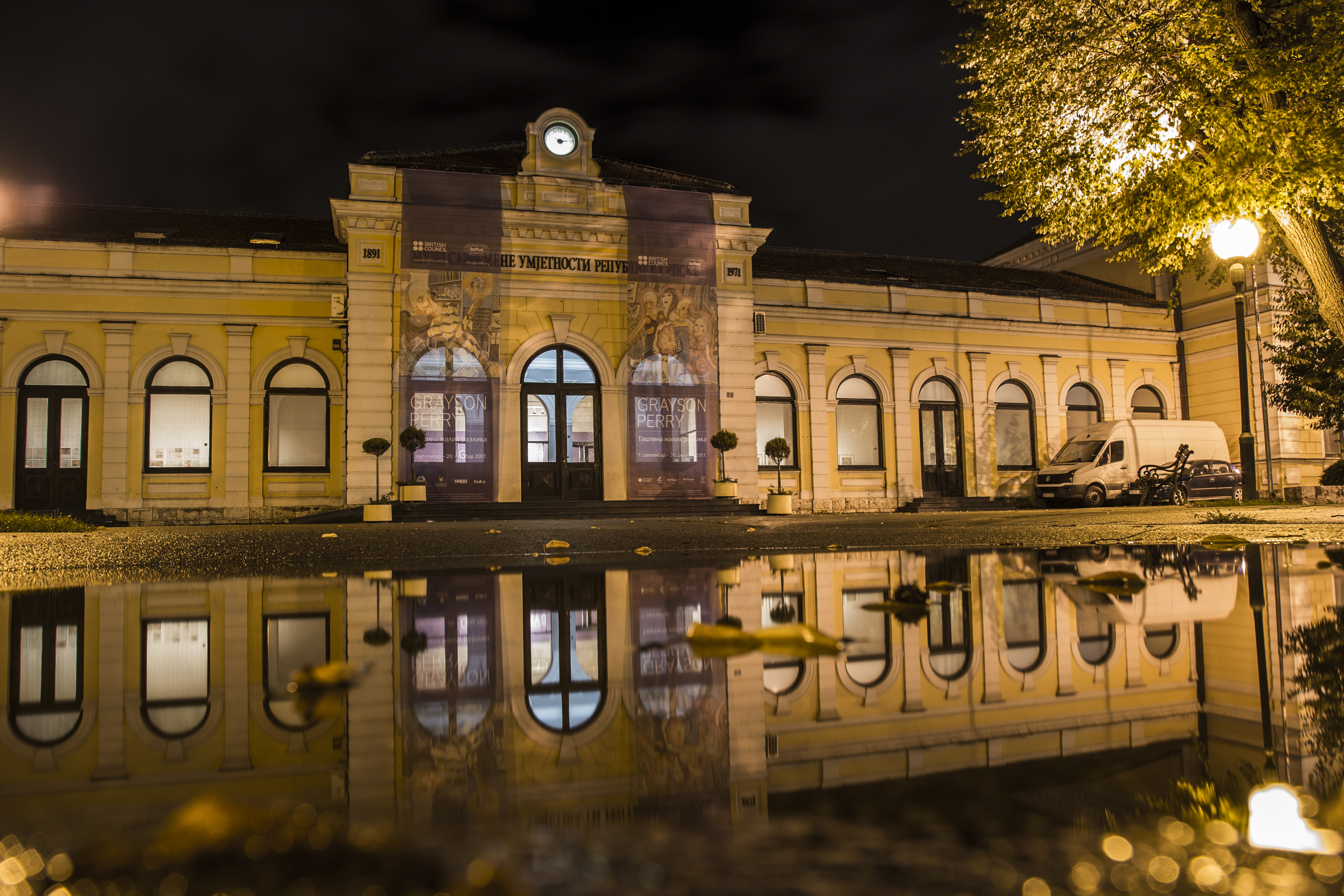
The Museum of Modern Art of Republika Srpska

The Museum of Republika Srpska succeeded the Ethnographic Museum established in 1930, and broadened its setting with exhibitions of archeology, history, art history and nature. The Museum of Modern Art of Republika Srpska, also called the Museum of Contemporary Art, displays exhibitions of both local and foreign artists.

Banja Luka is home to the National Theatre and National Library, both dating from the first half of the 20th century, along with numerous other theatres. The Archives of Republika Srpska are situated in the building known as Carska kuća or Imperial House, built around 1880. It has been in continuous public use longer than any other structure in Banja Luka.

There are several cultural and artistic societies in the city. The oldest is RKUD "Pelagić" (founded in 1927), one of the oldest institutions of its kind in Bosnia and Herzegovina.

== Education ==
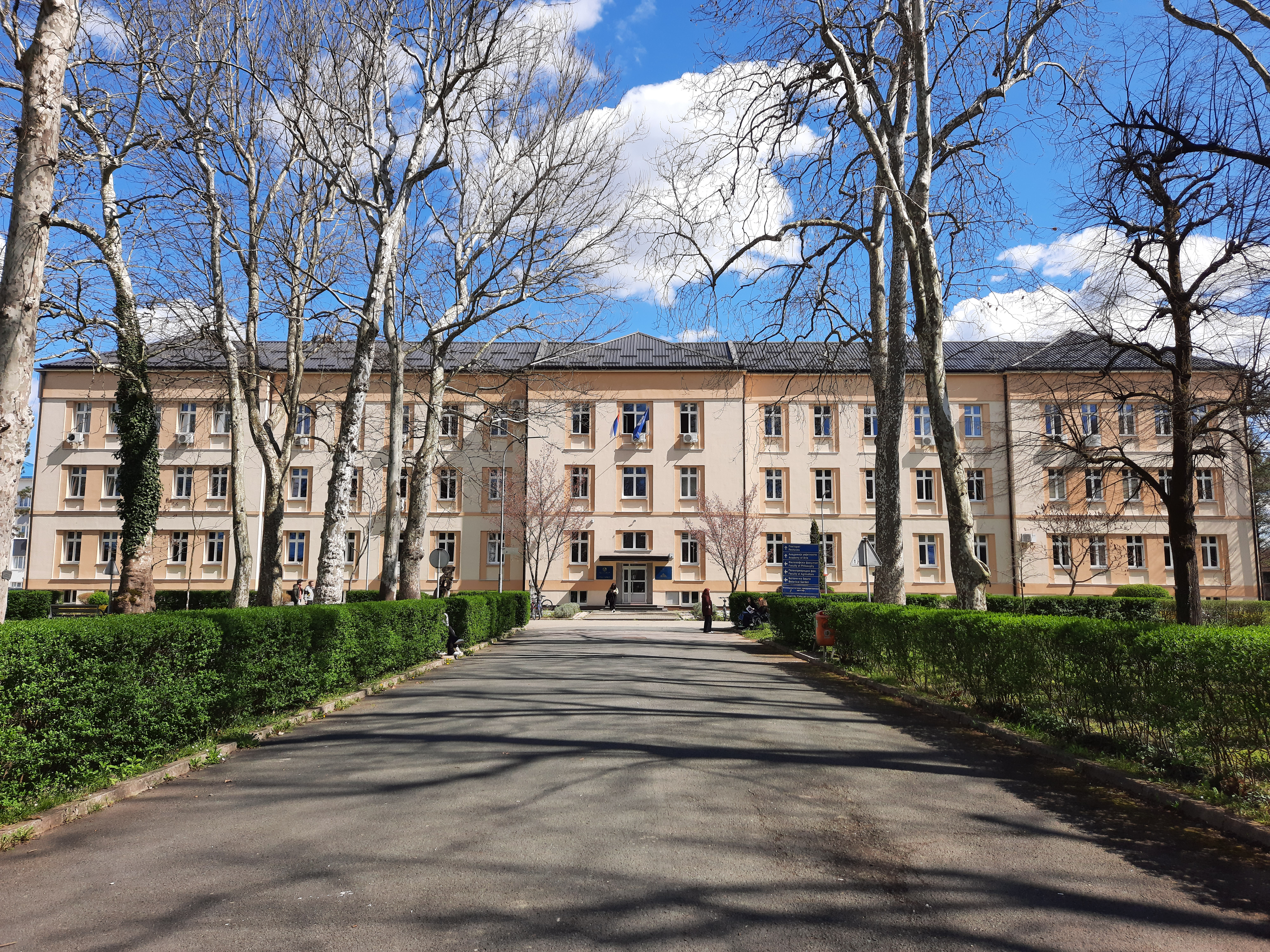
The building of the Academy of Arts and the Rectorate of the University of Banja Luka

Banja Luka has several state secondary schools — the Gymnasium, the Medical School, the Agricultural School, the Economics School, the Civil Engineering School, the Catering-Trade-Tourism School, the Technical School, the Technological School, the "Vlado Milošević" Music School, the Polytechnic School and the Electrotechnical School "Nikola Tesla".

Banja Luka is also the seat of the largest university in Republika Srpska. The University of Banja Luka has seventeen faculties and academies, attended by more than 10,000 students:

- Academy of Arts
- Faculty of Architecture, Civil Engineering and Geodesy
- Faculty of Economics
- Faculty of Electrical Engineering
- Faculty of Mechanical Engineering
- Faculty of Medicine
- Faculty of Agriculture
- Faculty of Law
- Faculty of Natural Sciences and Mathematics
- Faculty of Mining
- Faculty of Technology
- Faculty of Security Science
- Faculty of Political Science
- Faculty of Physical Education and Sport
- Faculty of Philosophy
- Faculty of Philology
- Faculty of Forestry

Along with the listed faculties, the university is also home to the Institute of Genetic Resources.

== Sport ==
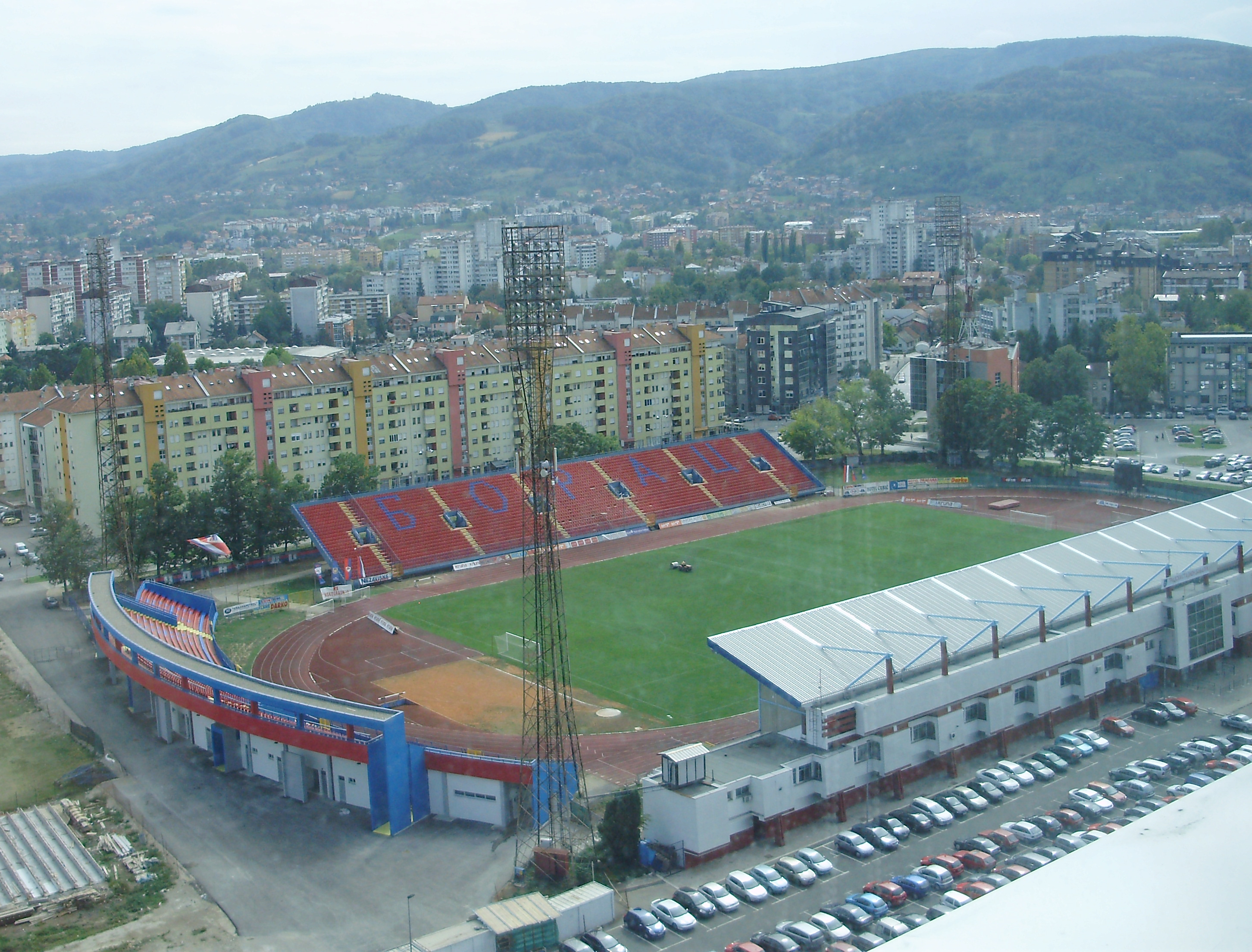
Banja Luka City Stadium

Banja Luka has one major football stadium and several indoor sports halls. The local handball, basketball, and football teams all bear the traditional name Borac (fighter). There are sixteen football clubs in the city, with the most notable being FK Borac Banja Luka, FK BSK Banja Luka, FK Omladinac Banja Luka, FK Naprijed Banja Luka, and FK Vrbas Banja Luka.

FK Borac Banja Luka is one of the most popular football clubs in Republika Srpska. The club has won several major trophies, such as the Mitropa Cup, Yugoslav Cup, Premier League of Bosnia and Herzegovina, Bosnia and Herzegovina Football Cup, 2007–08 First League of the Republika Srpska, and the Republika Srpska Cup. The club has participated in the UEFA Champions League as well as the UEFA Europa League.

The city has a long tradition of handball. RK Borac Banja Luka was the European champion in the 1975–76 European Cup, the runner-up in the 1974–75 European Cup, and the winner of the IHF Cup in 1991.

The local tennis tournament, Banja Luka Challenger, was awarded ATP status in 2001, with the rank of an ATP Challenger. The Banja Luka Challenger takes place in September each year. In 2006, the Davis Cup matches of the Europe/Africa Zone Group III took place in the city. In April 2023, Banja Luka was host to the 2023 Srpska Open tournament, as part of the 2023 ATP Tour.

Since 2015, the city has hosted the Banja Luka Half marathon.

In 2005 and 2019, the European Championships in rafting were held on the Vrbas river.

Banja Luka was designated a European City of Sport in 2018.

== Transport ==
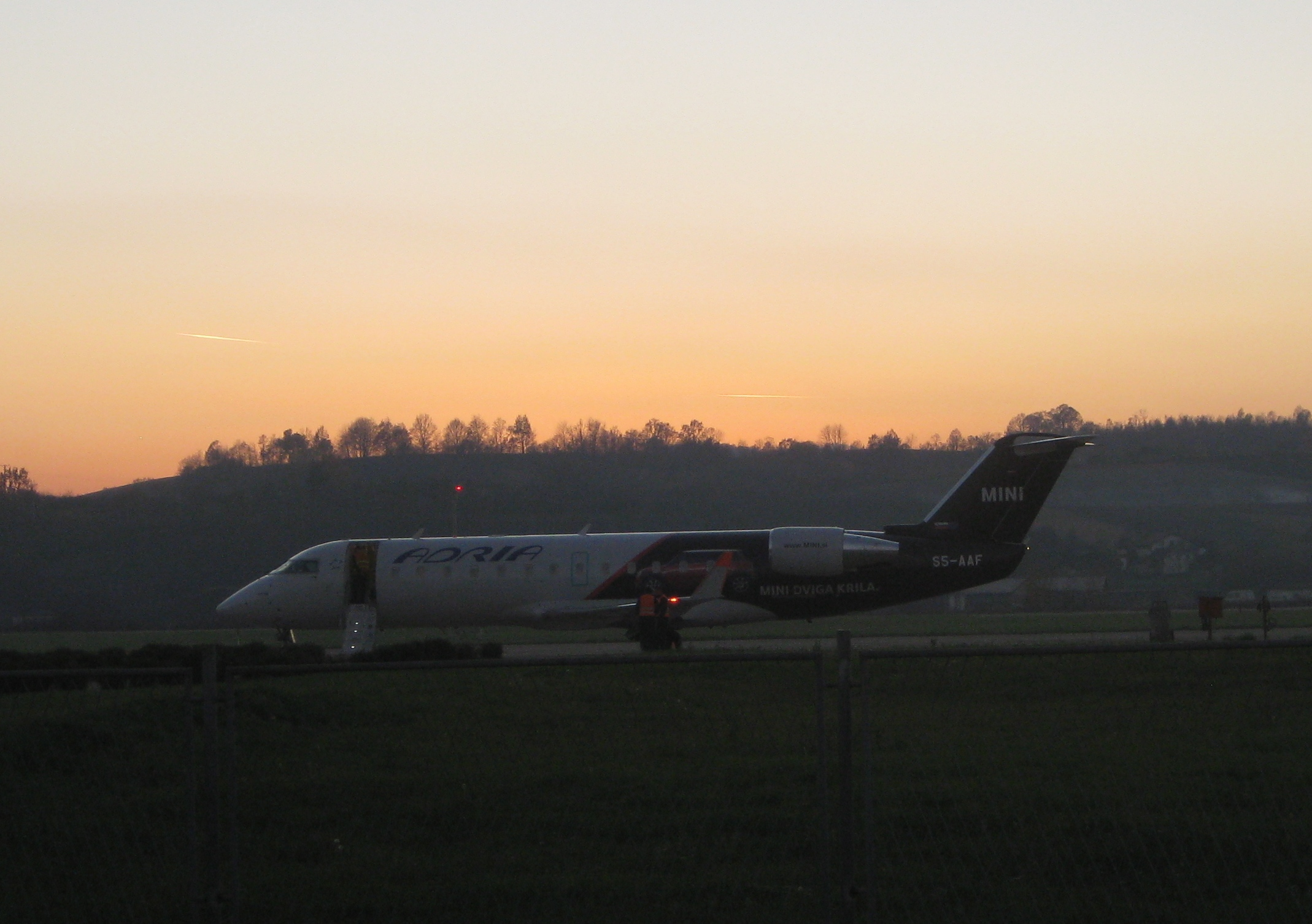
Banja Luka International Airport

Public transport within Banja Luka is exclusively operated by bus services. Twenty-three bus lines stretch across the city, connecting the city centre to the rest of the city and its suburbs. The oldest bus link in the city is line No. 1. Taxis are also readily available. The E-661 expressway (locally known as M-16) leads north to Croatia from Banja Luka by way of Gradiška, near the Bosnian/Croatian border. A wide range of bus services are available to most neighbouring and larger towns in Bosnia and Herzegovina, as well as to regional and European destinations such as Austria, Belgium, Croatia, Germany, France, Italy, Montenegro, the Netherlands, Serbia, Sweden, Switzerland, Hungary, and Slovakia.

Banja Luka is a minor hub of Republika Srpska Railways, which comprises half of the railway network of Bosnia and Herzegovina. Services operate to most northern Bosnian towns, and two modern air-conditioned 'Talgo' trains run to Sarajevo every day. However, services are relatively slow and infrequent compared with neighbouring countries.

Banja Luka International Airport (IATA: BNX, ICAO: LQBK) is located 23 km (14 mi) north of Banja Luka. The airport is served by Air Serbia, which operates flights to Belgrade, with summer charters to Antalya and Athens, while Ryanair operates flights to Milan, Berlin, Brussels, Gothenburg, Stockholm, Memmingen, Frankfurt-Hahn Airport, and Vienna. Moreover, there is also Banja Luka Zalužani Airfield, a small airstrip.

=== Public transport ===
Banja Luka overwhelmingly relies on a network of buses for its public transport. The following bus lines exist in the city:

- 1 - Mađir – Ortopedija – Nova bolnica
- 3 - ETF (Centar) – Vrbanja – Zeleni vir
- 3B - ETF (Centar) – Debeljaci
- 6 - Autobuska stanica – Lauš - Saračica
- 7 - Lauš - Paprikovac – Centar – Obilićevo (TO Bema)
- 8 - Autobuska stanica – Podgora
- 9 - Česma – Centar – Desna novoselija
- 9B - Česma – Medeno polje – Centar
- 9C - Česma – Most (Vrbas) – Centar
- 10 - Autobuska stanica – Obilićevo
- 12 - Centar – Paprikovac (Vidik)
- 13 - Lazarevo – Obilićevo
- 13A - Nova bolnica – Centar – Zalužani
- 13B - Novo groblje – Lazarevo (Poslovna škola)
- 13C - Centar – Tunjice – Zalužani (Nenada Kostića)
- 13P - Obilićevo (Krfska) – Petrićevac
- 14 - Starčevica – Centar – Starčevica
- 14B - Autobuska stanica – Borik – Starčevica
- 17 - Obilićevo – Nova bolnica
- 17A - Starčevica – Nova bolnica
- 19 - Šargovac – Centar
- 20 - Incel – Centar – Paprikovac (Ranka Šipke)
- 39 - Drakulić – Centar
- 39A - Drakulić (Avion) – Rakovačke bare – Centar

In addition to those, there are 33 suburban lines. Pensioners and citizens older than 65 enjoy free transit. The bus system faces several challenges, including the city government's debt to the private carriers and the vehicles' advanced age.

== International relations ==
Banja Luka has partnership agreements or is twinned with the following cities:

- Bari, Italy, since 2007
- Belgrade, Serbia, partnership agreement since 2003, twinned since 2020
- Bitonto, Italy, since 2007
- Budva, Montenegro, since 2021
- Campobasso, Italy
- Dayton, United States, since 2015
- Graz, Austria, since 2006, reaffirmed in 2009
- Kaiserslautern, Germany, since 2003
- Kranj, Slovenia, since 2006
- Kumanovo, North Macedonia, since 2012
- Lviv, Ukraine, since 2005
- (Serbia) Mitrovica, Kosovo, since 2014 (Note: Serbia maintains parallel municipal administrations in Kosovo through its Office for Kosovo and Metohija, as it does not recognise Kosovo's independence. The mayor of Banja Luka signed the partnership agreement with the president of the municipal assembly of Kosovska Mitrovica, one of these parallel administrations; the administration of the City of Mitrovica recognised by the Government of Kosovo has not signed a partnership agreement with Banja Luka.)
- Modi'in-Maccabim-Re'ut, Israel, since 2010
- Moscow, Russia, since 2003
- Nizhny Novgorod, Russia, since 2022
- Novi Sad, Serbia, since 2006
- Ouranoupoli, Greece, since 2024
- Patras, Greece, since 1995
- Pula, Croatia, since 2011
- Subotica, Serbia, since 2015
- Sremska Mitrovica, Serbia, since 2008
- Timișoara, Romania, since 2014
- Västerås, Sweden, since 1969
- Zemun, Serbia

== Notable people ==
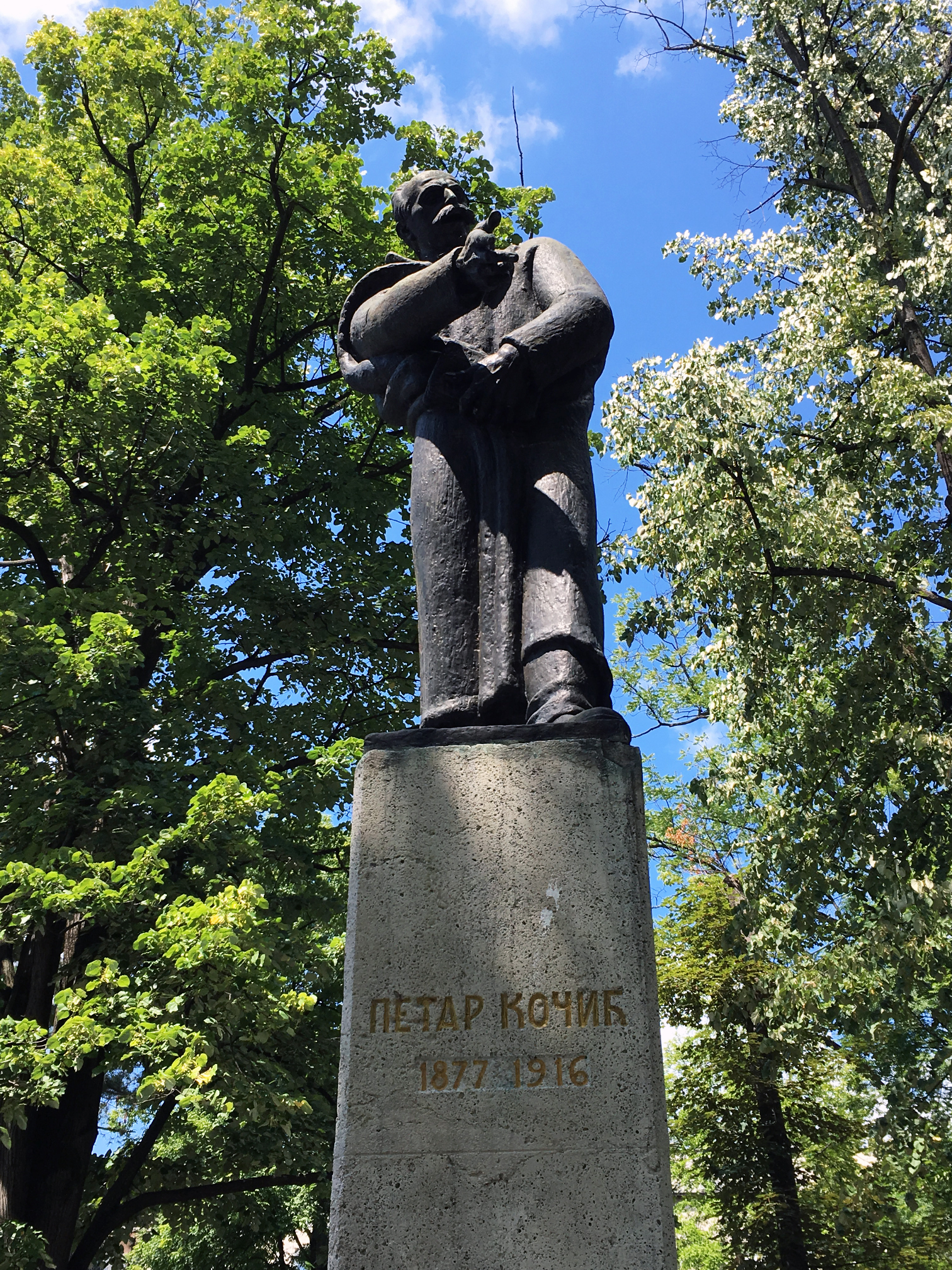
Monument to Petar Kočić

- Gorica Aćimović, Bosnian-Austrian handballer
- Srđan Babić, Serbian footballer
- Marijan Beneš, Yugoslav boxer and poet, European amateur and professional champion, Yugoslav Boxer of the 20th century
- Mladen Bojinović, Serbian handball player, World Championship bronze medalist
- Saša Čađo, Serbian basketball player, Olympic bronze medalist and European champion
- Adem Čejvan, Bosnian actor
- Nikola Ćaćić, Serbian tennis player
- Radenko Dobraš (born 1968), Serbian basketball player
- Nela Eržišnik, Croatian actress and comedian
- Muhamed Filipović, Bosnian academic, philosopher and writer
- Slađana Golić, Yugoslav and Bosnian basketball player, Olympic and World Championships silver medalist
- Srđan Grahovac, Bosnian footballer
- Zlatan Ibrahimbegović, Yugoslav slalom kayaker, represented Yugoslavia at the 1972 Munich Olympics and carried the Olympic torch for the 1984 Sarajevo Games
- Anton Josipović, Yugoslav boxer, Olympic champion
- Božidar Jović, Croatian handball player
- Ivan Franjo Jukić, Bosnian writer
- Nasiha Kapidžić-Hadžić, Bosnian writer and poet
- Osman Karabegović, Yugoslav and Bosnian politician
- Milorad Karalić, Serbian handball player, Olympic champion
- Tomislav Knez, Yugoslav football player, Olympic champion and European Championship silver medalist
- Aleksandar Knežević, Serbian handball player, European Championship bronze medalist
- Petar Kočić, Bosnian Serb writer
- Franjo Komarica, Roman Catholic Bishop of Banja Luka
- Abid Kovačević, Bosnian footballer
- Vladan Kovačević, Bosnian footballer
- DJ Krmak, Bosnian Croat singer
- Saša Lošić, Bosnian singer and composer
- Ivan Ljubičić, Croatian tennis player, World No. 3 and Olympic bronze medalist
- Ibrahim Maglajlić, Grand Mufti of Yugoslavia (1930 to 1936)
- Darko Maletić, Bosnian footballer
- Ivan Merz, Catholic lay academic; beatified by Pope John Paul II
- Draženko Mitrović, Serbian athlete, two-time Paralympic silver medalist and European champion
- Zlatan Muslimović, Bosnian footballer
- Mustafa Nadarević, Bosnian and Croatian actor
- Romana Panić, Bosnian Serb singer
- Nikola Pejaković, Serbian actor and musician
- Oto Rebula, Serbian athlete
- Zlatko Saračević, Croatian handball player, Olympic and World champion
- Velimir Sombolac, Serbian football player and manager, Olympic champion
- Neven Subotić, Serbian footballer
- Marija Šestić, Bosnian singer
- Slađana Topić, Bosnian handball player
- Ognjen Vranješ, Bosnian footballer
- Srđan Vujmilović, photographer

== See also ==
- Coat of arms of Banja Luka

== Bibliography ==
- Ćorović, Vladimir (1920). Crna knjiga: patnje Srba Bosne i Hercegovine za vreme Svetskog rata 1914-1918. Belgrade: Izdanje I. Đ. Đurđevića.
- Đaja, Mato (1962). Banja Luka u putopisima i zapisima. Banja Luka: Glas.
- Jelovac, Vuk (1960). Banja Luka u prošlosti. Banja Luka: Glas.
- Latinović, Goran; Ožegović, Nikola (2022). Hrvatski zločin nad Srbima u rudniku Rakovac i selima Drakulić, Šargovac i Motike kod Banje Luke 7. februara 1942. Banja Luka: Baštionik.
- Lukajić, Lazar (2005). Fratri i ustaše kolju. Belgrade: Fond za istraživanje genocida.
- Mikić, Đorđe (1995). Banja Luka na Krajini hvala. Banja Luka: Opština Banja Luka i Institut za istoriju.
- Pejašinović, Zoran (2009). Banja Luka. Alejama prošlosti i sadašnjosti. Vodič. Banja Luka: Grad Banja Luka i Međunarodno udruženje naučnih radnika (AIS).
- Ravlić, Aleksandar (1974). Banja Luka. Razdoblja i stoljeća. Belgrade: Mladost.
- Spremo, Dragiša (1966). Banja Luka: Istorija, kultura, privreda, turizam. Banja Luka: Književni klub.
- Ševo, Ljiljana (1996). Urbanistički razvoj Banje Luke. Banja Luka: Zavod za zaštitu spomenika kulture i prirode Banja Luka. ISBN 86-82897-01-6. OCLC 38880289.
