= Debeljaci =

Debeljaci Дебељаци (Serbian)
- Village (Selo)
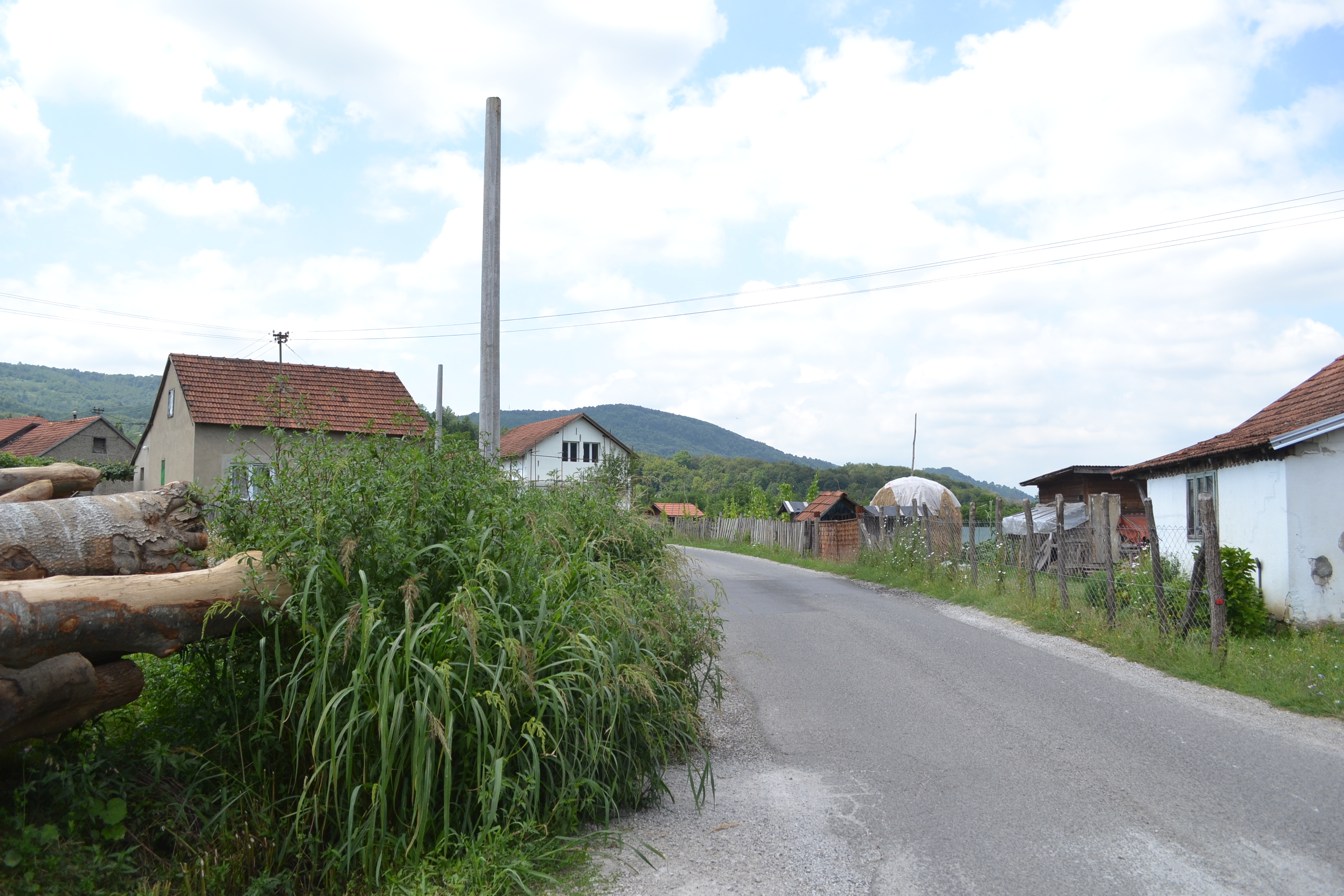

- Location within Bosnia and Herzegovina
- Coordinates: 44°44′21″N 17°15′15″E
- Country: Bosnia and Herzegovina
- Entity: Republika Srpska
- Municipality: Banja Luka

Population (2013)
  - Total: 1,219
- Time zone: UTC+1 (CET)
  - Summer (DST): UTC+2 (CEST)

Debeljaci (Serbian Cyrillic: Дебељаци) is a village in the municipality of Banja Luka, Republika Srpska, Bosnia and Herzegovina.

== Demographics ==
Ethnic groups in the village include:

- 1,155 Serbs (94.75%)
- 47 Croats (3.86%)
- 17 Others (1.40%)
