= Potkozarje, Banja Luka =

Potkozarje Поткозарје (Serbian) Ivanjska (Croatian)
- Village (Selo)
- Location within Bosnia and Herzegovina
- Coordinates: 44°55′N 17°04′E
- Country: Bosnia and Herzegovina
- Entity: Republika Srpska
- Municipality: Banja Luka

Population (2013)
  - Total: 3,296
- Time zone: UTC+1 (CET)
  - Summer (DST): UTC+2 (CEST)

Potkozarje (Serbian Cyrillic: Поткозарје), formerly Ivanjska (Serbian Cyrillic: Ивањска), is a village in Banja Luka, Republika Srpska, Bosnia and Herzegovina.

== History ==
An Ottoman census conducted in 1604 recorded a total of 42 households in Ivanjska, 11 Muslim and 31 non-Muslim, as part of the Banaluka nahiye.

Between some time after 1953 and 1963, Ivanjska was a separate municipality from Banja Luka. Other than the town itself, municipality included the settlements of Barlovci, Cerici, Dragočaj, Piskavica, Prijakovci, Radosavska, Ramići, Šimići and Verići.

The majority Croat population of Ivanjska faced persecution during the Bosnian War by Serb authorities, causing most of them to flee from the region. As part of their broader ethnic cleansing campaign, Serb authorities renamed Ivanjska to Potkozarje.

== Demographics ==
Ethnic composition
Year	2013	1991	1981	1971
Bosniaks	9	-	-	-
Serbs	2,776	1,095	1,180	1,408
Croats	240	3,306	3,394	3,614
Muslims (ethnic group)	2	6	3	7
Yugoslavs	3	118	303	2
Ukrainians	2	-	-	-
Slovenes	1	-	4	3
Others	9	-	16	5
Undeclared	11	-	-	-
Unknown	1	-	-	1
Total	3,067	4,577	4,953	5,062
