= Demographics of Bosnia and Herzegovina =

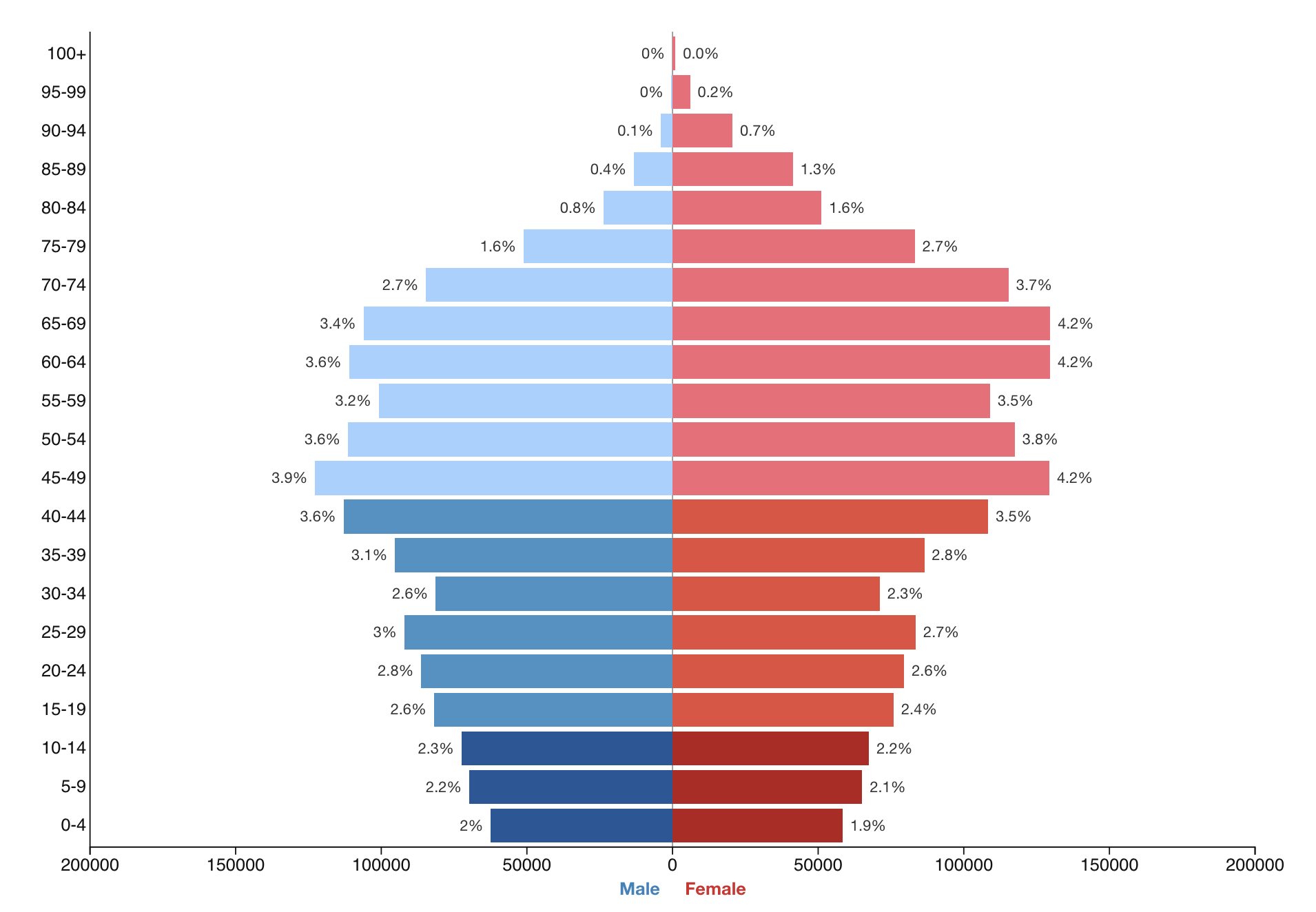
- Population pyramid of Bosnia and Herzegovina in 2026
- Population: 3,269,516 (2025 est.)
- Growth rate: +0.37% (2025 est.)
- Birth rate: 8.2 births/1,000 population (2025 est.)
- Death rate: 10.1 deaths/1,000 population (2025 est.)
- Life expectancy: 77.98 years
  - male: 75.02 years
  - female: 81.15 years
- Fertility rate: 1.36 children born/woman (2022 est.)
- Infant mortality: 5.21 deaths/1,000 live births
- Net migration rate: -0.38 migrant(s)/1,000 population (2022 est.)
- Immigrant share: 1.1% (2024)

Age structure
- 0–14 years: 13.18%
- 65 and over: 16.22%

Sex ratio
- Total: 0.95 male(s)/female (2022 est.)
- At birth: 1.07 male(s)/female
- Under 15: 1.07 male(s)/female
- 65 and over: 0.42 male(s)/female

Nationality
- Nationality: Bosnian
- Major ethnic: Bosniak (50.1%)
- Minor ethnic: Serb (30.7%), Croat (15.4%)

Language
- Official: Bosnian, Serbian, Croatian
- Spoken: Bosnian, Serbian, Croatian

Demographic features of the population of Bosnia and Herzegovina include population density, ethnicity, education level, health of the populace, economic status, religious affiliations and other aspects of the population.

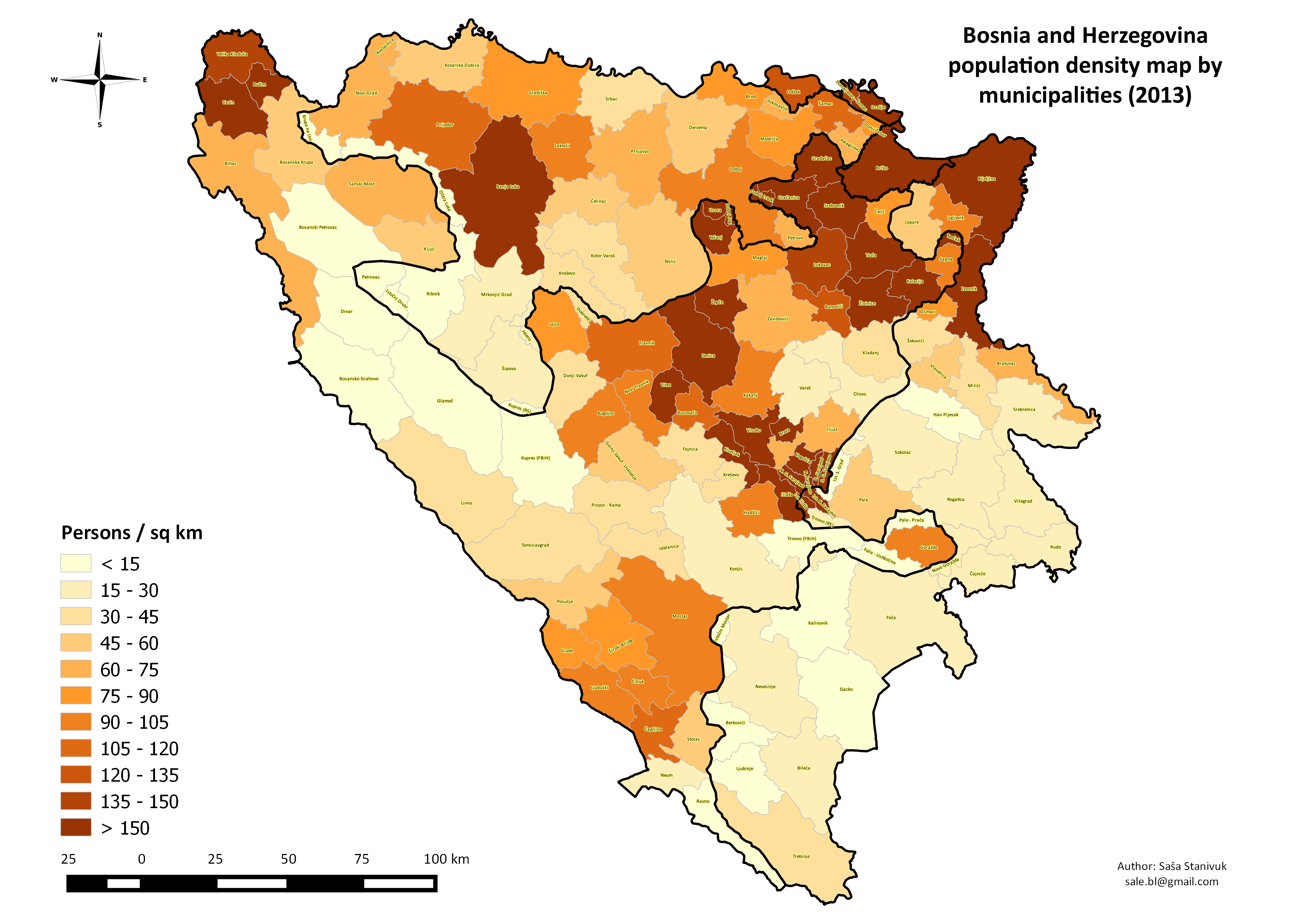
Population density in Bosnia and Herzegovina by municipality, early data from the 2013 census

== Vital statistics ==
Source: Agency for Statistics of Bosnia and Herzegovina

Notable events in Bosnian demography:

- 1992–1995 – Bosnian War

Year	Mid-year population	Live births	Deaths	Natural change	Crude birth rate (per 1000)	Crude death rate (per 1000)	Natural change (per 1000)	Total fertility rate	Female fertile population (15–49 years)
1947	2,532,000	84,600	38,900	45,700	33.4	15.4	18.0		
1948	2,581,987	90,700	41,600	49,100	35.1	16.1	19.0		647,112
1949	2,641,990	98,200	42,200	56,000	37.2	16.0	21.2		669,152
1950	2,662,010	102,680	35,991	66,689	38.6	13.5	25.1	5.17	691,192
1951	2,721,009	92,330	46,358	45,972	33.9	17.0	16.9	4.51	713,232
1952	2,790,991	112,216	34,817	77,399	40.2	12.5	27.7	5.33	735,272
1953	2,863,124	110,373	41,199	69,174	38.5	14.4	24.2	4.84	757,312
1954	2,916,007	115,854	35,158	80,696	39.7	12.1	27.7	4.93	765,462
1955	2,973,986	110,866	40,513	70,353	37.3	13.6	23.7	4.59	773,612
1956	3,025,000	111,561	38,320	73,241	36.9	12.7	24.2	4.48	781,761
1957	3,076,006	102,649	36,830	65,819	33.4	12.0	21.4	4.02	789,911
1958	3,126,012	110,332	30,123	80,209	35.3	9.6	25.7	4.22	798,061
1959	3,185,005	108,123	32,507	75,616	33.9	10.2	23.7	4.06	806,211
1960	3,240,010	110,499	33,360	77,139	34.1	10.3	23.8	4.06	814,360
1961	3,291,684	108,076	29,413	78,663	32.8	8.9	23.9	3.91	822,510
1962	3,338,505	106,826	31,087	75,739	32.0	9.3	22.7	3.86	838,877
1963	3,385,326	104,240	29,161	75,079	30.8	8.6	22.2	3.75	855,245
1964	3,432,147	101,147	29,846	71,301	29.5	8.7	20.8	3.62	871,612
1965	3,478,968	101,351	27,814	73,537	29.1	8.0	21.1	3.61	887,979
1966	3,525,789	97,689	25,138	72,551	27.7	7.1	20.6	3.46	904,347
1967	3,572,609	92,972	26,195	66,777	26.0	7.3	18.7	3.28	920,714
1968	3,619,430	89,134	26,031	63,103	24.6	7.2	17.4	3.14	937,081
1969	3,666,251	87,687	27,805	59,882	23.9	7.6	16.3	3.05	953,448
1970	3,713,072	79,296	26,355	52,941	21.4	7.1	14.3	2.74	969,816
1971	3,759,893	82,694	24,915	57,779	22.0	6.6	15.4	2.83	986,183
1972	3,797,523	82,068	26,844	55,224	21.6	7.1	14.5	2.76	998,220
1973	3,835,154	77,896	24,672	53,224	20.3	6.4	13.9	2.57	1,010,257
1974	3,872,784	77,833	23,661	54,172	20.1	6.1	14.0	2.52	1,022,293
1975	3,910,414	78,844	25,571	53,273	20.2	6.5	13.6	2.51	1,034,330
1976	3,948,045	79,061	25,178	53,883	20.0	6.4	13.6	2.47	1,046,367
1977	3,985,675	75,669	24,821	50,848	19.0	6.2	12.8	2.32	1,058,404
1978	4,023,305	73,306	26,016	47,290	18.2	6.5	11.8	2.21	1,070,441
1979	4,060,935	71,120	25,370	45,750	17.5	6.2	11.3	2.10	1,082,477
1980	4,098,566	70,928	26,115	44,813	17.3	6.4	10.9	2.06	1,094,514
1981	4,136,196	71,031	26,222	44,809	17.2	6.3	10.8	2.03	1,106,551
1982	4,160,280	73,375	26,775	46,600	17.6	6.4	11.2	2.09	1,105,958
1983	4,184,363	74,296	29,999	44,297	17.8	7.2	10.6	2.12	1,105,366
1984	4,208,447	74,539	29,046	45,493	17.7	6.9	10.8	2.13	1,104,773
1985	4,232,531	72,722	28,966	43,756	17.2	6.8	10.3	2.08	1,104,181
1986	4,256,615	71,203	29,127	42,076	16.7	6.8	9.9	2.04	1,103,588
1987	4,280,698	70,898	29,382	41,516	16.6	6.9	9.7	2.03	1,102,995
1988	4,304,782	70,711	29,555	41,156	16.4	6.9	9.6	2.03	1,102,403
1989	4,328,866	66,809	30,383	36,426	15.4	7.0	8.4	1.92	1,101,810
1990	4,352,949	66,952	29,093	37,859	15.4	6.7	8.7	1.93	1,101,218
1991	4,377,033	64,769	30,680	34,089	14.8	7.0	7.8	1.87	1,100,625
1992*									
1993*									
1994*									
1995*									
1996	3,368,597	46,594	25,152	21,442	13.8	7.5	6.4	1.88	862,840
1997	3,398,264	48,061	27,875	20,186	14.1	8.2	5.9	1.95	866,251
1998	3,423,921	45,007	28,679	16,328	13.1	8.4	4.8	1.83	870,474
1999	3,445,172	42,464	28,637	13,827	12.3	8.3	4.0	1.73	874,188
2000	3,462,336	39,563	30,482	9,081	11.4	8.8	2.6	1.61	876,695
2001	3,478,679	37,717	30,325	7,392	10.8	8.7	2.1	1.54	879,484
2002	3,493,146	35,587	30,155	5,432	10.4	8.8	1.6	1.49	881,166
2003	3,498,291	35,234	31,757	3,477	9.9	9.2	0.8	1.42	879,547
2004	3,501,467	35,151	32,216	2,535	9.7	9.2	0.5	1.38	877,903
2005	3,503,634	34,627	34,402	225	9.5	9.7	-0.2	1.36	875,167
2006	3,500,212	34,033	33,221	812	9.4	9.3	0.1	1.36	871,089
2007	3,498,023	33,835	35,044	-1,209	9.4	9.8	-0.5	1.35	867,212
2008	3,493,737	34,176	34,026	150	9.7	9.7	0.0	1.41	859,217
2009	3,491,327	34,550	34,904	-260	9.9	9.9	-0.1	1.43	851,596
2010	3,488,441	33,528	35,118	-1,460	9.6	10.0	-0.4	1.40	847,365
2011	3,484,154	31,811	35,028	-3,217	9.1	10.0	-0.9	1.33	843,765
2012	3,479,339	32,547	35,817	-3,270	9.3	10.2	-0.9	1.36	839,698
2013	3,473,826	30,684	35,662	-4,978	8.8	10.2	-1.4	1.30	832,872
2014	3,466,507	30,268	35,980	-5,712	8.7	10.3	-1.6	1.29	825,060
2015	3,456,500	29,770	38,150	-8,229	8.6	11.0	-2.4	1.28	815,928
2016	3,447,001	30,183	36,571	-6,388	8.7	10.5	-1.8	1.30	806,794
2017	3,437,453	30,200	37,979	-7,779	8.7	10.9	-2.2	1.31	797,851
2018	3,427,369	29,467	37,744	-8,277	8.6	10.9	-2.3	1.29	789,269
2019	3,415,752	28,360	38,829	-10,469	8.3	11.2	-2.9	1.26	781,299
2020	3,403,638	27,255	44,427	-17,172	8.0	12.9	-4.9	1.23	772,876
2021	3,378,821	27,143	50,333	-23,190	8.0	14.7	-6.7	1.24	763,709
2022	3,358,496	26,687	41,296	-14,609	7.9	12.1	-4.2	1.23	755,419
2023	3,345,818	26,451	35,471	-9,020	7.9	10.5	-2.6	1.23	748,332
2024	3,335,615	26,037	36,423	-10,386	7.8	10.7	-3.0	1.23	741,420
2025	3,323,539	26,108	37,153	-11,045	7.8	11.0	-3.2	1.26	734,308

*No data for the period 1992–1995

=== Current vital statistics ===
Period	Live births	Deaths	Natural increase
January—June 2025	10,831	18,162	-7,331
January—June 2026	11,604	17,568	-5,964
Difference	▲ +773 (+7.14%)	▼ -594 (-3.27%)	▲ +1,367

=== Structure of the population ===
Population by Sex and Age Group (Census 30.IX.2013):

Age group	Male	Female	Total	%
Total	1 732 270	1 798 889	3 531 159	100
0–4	89 442	84 622	174 064	4.93
5–9	90 881	86 099	176 980	5.01
10–14	98 653	94 022	192 675	5.46
15–19	124 900	117 842	242 742	6.87
20–24	116 883	111 173	228 056	6.46
25–29	129 248	123 070	252 318	7.15
30–34	128 593	124 040	252 633	7.15
35–39	126 145	123 121	249 266	7.06
40–44	121 595	119 543	241 138	6.83
45–49	130 087	130 841	260 928	7.39
50–54	136 153	140 422	276 575	7.83
55–59	125 576	132 961	258 537	7.32
60–64	104 970	118 281	223 251	6.32
65–69	69 066	84 503	153 569	4.35
70–74	59 854	80 601	140 455	3.98
75–79	47 403	69 864	117 267	3.32
80–84	23 769	38 867	62 636	1.77
85+	9 052	19 017	28 069	0.79
Age group	Male	Female	Total	Percent
0–14	278 976	264 743	543 719	15.40
15–64	1 244 150	1 241 294	2 485 444	70.39
65+	209 144	292 852	501 996	14.22

=== Vital statistics by entity ===
==== Federation of Bosnia and Herzegovina ====
Source: Institute for Statistics of the Federation of Bosnia and Herzegovina

	Mid-year population	Live births	Deaths	Natural change	Crude birth rate (per 1,000)	Crude death rate (per 1,000)	Natural change (per 1,000)	Total fertility rate	Female fertile population (15–49 years)
1991	2,720,074	42,426	18,332	24,094	15.6	6.7	8.9	1.92	696,784
1992									
1993									
1994									
1995									
1996	2,141,341	34,331	14,221	20,110	16.0	6.6	9.4	2.05	579,263
1997	2,161,442	34,304	16,120	18,184	15.9	7.5	8.4	2.06	581,215
1998	2,176,885	31,480	16,210	15,270	14.5	7.4	7.0	1.90	583,979
1999	2,189,576	27,964	16,108	11,856	12.8	7.4	5.4	1.70	586,234
2000	2,199,128	25,372	17,112	8,260	11.5	7.8	3.8	1.54	587,282
2001	2,208,263	24,018	16,891	7,127	10.9	7.6	3.2	1.47	588,612
2002	2,215,548	23,251	17,175	6,076	10.5	7.8	2.7	1.43	588,834
2003	2,222,079	23,168	18,259	4,909	10.4	8.2	2.2	1.42	588,042
2004	2,227,181	22,250	18,350	3,900	10.0	8.2	1.8	1.36	587,226
2005	2,231,764	21,934	19,293	2,641	9.8	8.6	1.2	1.35	585,319
2006	2,230,967	21,602	18,678	2,924	9.7	8.4	1.3	1.33	582,071
2007	2,231,548	21,715	19,428	2,287	9.7	8.7	1.0	1.35	579,026
2008	2,229,787	22,920	19,480	3,440	10.3	8.7	1.5	1.43	571,863
2009	2,229,072	22,913	20,022	2,891	10.3	9.0	1.3	1.44	565,074
2010	2,228,027	22,382	20,482	1,900	10.0	9.2	0.9	1.41	561,677
2011	2,226,011	21,228	20,208	1,020	9.5	9.1	0.5	1.34	558,911
2012	2,222,587	21,472	20,859	613	9.7	9.4	0.3	1.36	555,678
2013	2,219,131	20,145	20,465	-320	9.1	9.2	-0.1	1.29	551,251
2014	2,215,997	19,880	20,283	-403	9.0	9.2	-0.2	1.29	546,324
2015	2,210,994	19,358	21,703	-2,345	8.8	9.8	-1.1	1.26	540,354
2016	2,206,231	19,655	21,105	-1,450	8.9	9.6	-0.7	1.28	534,268
2017	2,201,193	19,824	21,689	-1,865	9.0	9.9	-0.8	1.29	528,096
2018	2,196,233	18,899	21,442	-2,543	8.6	9.8	-1.2	1.25	522,242
2019	2,190,098	18,019	22,024	-4,005	8.2	10.1	-1.8	1.21	516,595
2020	2,184,680	17,211	26,026	-8,815	7.9	11.9	-4.0	1.16	512,053
2021	2,168,602	16,873	29,086	-12,213	7.8	13.4	-5.6	1.15	506,760
2022	2,156,846	16,538	23,187	-6,649	7.7	10.8	-3.1	1.14	501,018
2023	2,150,054	16,174	20,361	-4,187	7.5	9.5	-1.9	1.13	496,545
2024	2,144,748	15,883	20,484	-4,601	7.4	9.6	-2.1	1.12	492,238
2025	2,138,121	16,312	21,591	-5,279	7.6	10.1	-2.5	1.18	487,826
2026	2,133,059								

===== Current vital statistics =====
Period	Live births	Deaths	Natural increase
January–September 2025	10,967	15,132	-4,165
January–September 2026	11,691	14,808	-3,117
Difference	▲ +724 (+6.6%)	▼ -324 (-2.14%)	▲ +1,048

==== Republika Srpska ====
Source: Republika Srpska Institute of Statistics

	Mid-year population	Live births	Deaths	Natural change	Crude birth rate (per 1000)	Crude death rate (per 1000)	Natural change (per 1000)	Total fertility rate	Female fertile population (15–49 years)
1991	1,569,332	21,149	11,735	9,414	13.5	7.5	6.0	1.79	381,699
1992									
1993									
1994									
1995									
1996	1,193,656	11,939	10,676	1,263	10.0	8.9	1.1	1.54	274,878
1997	1,194,919	13,374	11,464	1,910	11.2	9.6	1.6	1.73	274,188
1998	1,196,829	13,046	12,123	923	10.9	10.1	0.8	1.69	273,497
1999	1,197,086	13,995	12,152	1,843	11.7	10.2	1.5	1.83	272,806
2000	1,196,395	13,643	12,960	683	11.4	10.8	0.6	1.78	272,116
2001	1,195,299	13,047	12,932	115	10.9	10.8	0.1	1.72	271,425
2002	1,194,178	12,336	12,980	-644	10.3	10.9	-0.5	1.62	270,735
2003	1,192,622	10,537	12,988	-2,451	8.8	10.9	-2.1	1.40	270,044
2004	1,190,526	10,628	13,082	-2,454	8.9	11.0	-2.1	1.41	269,354
2005	1,187,940	10,322	13,802	-3,480	8.7	11.6	-2.9	1.37	268,663
2006	1,185,145	10,524	13,232	-2,708	8.9	11.2	-2.3	1.40	267,972
2007	1,182,217	10,110	14,146	-4,036	8.6	12.0	-3.4	1.34	267,282
2008	1,179,717	10,198	13,501	-3,303	8.6	11.4	-2.8	1.36	266,591
2009	1,177,995	10,603	13,775	-3,172	9.0	11.7	-2.7	1.41	265,901
2010	1,176,419	10,147	13,517	-3,370	8.6	11.5	-2.9	1.35	265,210
2011	1,174,420	9,561	13,658	-4,097	8.1	11.6	-3.5	1.28	264,520
2012	1,173,131	9,978	13,796	-3,818	8.5	11.8	-3.3	1.34	263,829
2013	1,171,179	9,510	13,978	-4,468	8.1	11.9	-3.8	1.29	261,574
2014	1,167,082	9,335	14,409	-5,074	8.0	12.3	-4.3	1.28	258,833
2015	1,162,164	9,357	15,059	-5,702	8.1	13.0	-4.9	1.29	255,815
2016	1,157,516	9,452	13,970	-4,518	8.2	12.1	-3.9	1.32	252,911
2017	1,153,017	9,339	14,663	-5,324	8.1	12.7	-4.6	1.31	250,241
2018	1,147,902	9,568	14,763	-5,195	8.3	12.9	-4.5	1.37	247,599
2019	1,142,495	9,274	15,081	-5,807	8.1	13.2	-5.1	1.34	245,368
2020	1,136,274	9,161	16,582	-7,421	8.1	14.6	-6.5	1.36	241,626
2021	1,128,309	9,274	19,002	-9,728	8.2	16.8	-8.6	1.41	237,927
2022	1,120,236	9,118	16,263	-7,145	8.1	14.5	-6.4	1.40	235,589
2023	1,114,819	9,309	13,508	-4,199	8.4	12.1	-3.8	1.45	233,233
2024	1,110,496	9,227	14,136	-4,909	8.3	12.7	-4.4	1.46	230,897
2025	1,105,469	8,825	13,904	-5,079	8.0	12.6	-4.6	1.43	228,440

===== Current vital statistics =====
Period	Live births	Deaths	Natural increase
January—September 2025	5,915	10,617	-4,702
January—September 2026	6,046	10,514	-4,468
Difference	▲ +131 (+2.22%)	▼ -103 (-0.97%)	▲ +234

==== Brčko District ====
Source: Agency for Statistics of Bosnia and Herzegovina - Statistics of the Brčko District BiH

	Mid-year population	Live births	Deaths	Natural change	Crude birth rate (per 1000)	Crude death rate (per 1000)	Natural change (per 1000)	Total fertility rate	Female fertile population (15–49 years)
1991	87,627	1,194	613	581	13.6	7.0	6.6	1.69	22,142
1992									
1993									
1994									
1995									
1996	33,600	324	255	69	9.6	7.6	2.1	1.38	8,699
1997	41,903	383	291	92	9.1	6.9	2.2	1.31	10,848
1998	50,207	481	346	135	9.6	6.9	2.7	1.38	12,998
1999	58,510	505	377	128	8.6	6.4	2.2	1.24	15,148
2000	66,813	548	410	138	8.2	6.1	2.1	1.17	17,297
2001	75,117	652	502	150	8.7	6.7	2.0	1.25	19,447
2002	83,420	898	676	222	10.8	8.1	2.7	1.58	21,597
2003	83,590	986	771	215	11.8	9.2	2.6	1.72	21,461
2004	83,760	984	791	193	11.7	9.4	2.3	1.73	21,323
2005	83,930	977	830	147	11.6	9.9	1.8	1.70	21,185
2006	84,100	912	742	170	10.8	8.8	2.0	1.59	21,045
2007	84,258	976	818	158	11.6	9.7	1.9	1.71	20,905
2008	84,233	905	890	15	10.7	10.6	0.2	1.58	20,763
2009	84,260	933	912	21	11.1	10.8	0.2	1.63	20,621
2010	83,995	916	906	10	10.9	10.8	0.1	1.61	20,478
2011	83,723	905	954	-49	10.8	11.4	-0.6	1.61	20,335
2012	83,621	964	923	41	11.5	11.0	0.5	1.71	20,191
2013	83,516	896	936	-40	10.7	11.2	-0.5	1.60	20,047
2014	83,428	919	1,000	-81	11.0	12.0	-1.0	1.65	19,903
2015	83,342	932	1,114	-182	11.2	13.4	-2.2	1.69	19,759
2016	83,254	878	990	-112	10.5	11.9	-1.3	1.59	19,615
2017	83,243	898	1,101	-203	10.8	13.2	-2.4	1.63	19,514
2018	83,234	861	1,032	-171	10.3	12.4	-2.1	1.58	19,428
2019	83,159	899	1,132	-233	10.8	13.6	-2.8	1.66	19,336
2020	82,684	784	1,200	-416	9.5	14.5	-5.0	1.47	19,197
2021	81,910	846	1,594	-748	10.3	19.5	-9.1	1.58	19,022
2022	81,414	860	1,242	-382	10.6	15.3	-4.7	1.63	18,812
2023	80,945	811	1,114	-303	10.0	13.8	-3.7	1.56	18,554
2024	80,371	779	1,192	-413	9.7	14.8	-5.1	1.50	18,285
2025	79,949	798	1,153	-355	10.0	14.4	-4.4	1.58	18,042

===== Current vital statistics =====
Period	Live births	Deaths	Natural increase
January—August 2025	504	732	-228
January—August 2026	480	715	-235
Difference	▼ -24 (-4.76%)	▼ -17 (-2.32%)	▼ -7

=== Marriages and divorces ===
	Mid-year	Marriages	Divorces	Crude marriage rate (per 1,000)	Crude divorce rate (per 1,000)	Divorces per 1,000 marriages
1950	2,662,010	30,242	2,447	11.4	0.9	80.9
1951	2,721,009	30,638	1,883	11.3	0.7	61.5
1952	2,790,991	33,040	1,313	11.8	0.5	39.7
1953	2,863,124	31,069	1,931	10.9	0.7	62.2
1954	2,916,007	31,658	2,023	10.9	0.7	63.9
1955	2,973,986	29,179	2,331	9.8	0.8	79.9
1956	3,025,000	27,361	2,596	9.0	0.9	94.9
1957	3,076,006	27,928	2,662	9.1	0.9	95.3
1958	3,126,012	33,901	3,249	10.8	1.0	95.8
1959	3,185,005	31,926	2,788	10.0	0.9	87.3
1960	3,240,010	32,855	3,320	10.1	1.0	101.1
1961	3,291,684	31,842	3,126	9.7	0.9	98.2
1962	3,368,774	30,620	3,150	9.1	0.9	102.9
1963	3,444,107	29,749	3,002	8.6	0.9	100.9
1964	3,517,207	31,424	3,267	8.9	0.9	104.0
1965	3,589,486	33,214	2,693	9.3	0.8	81.1
1966	3,667,002	31,842	3,554	8.7	1.0	111.6
1967	3,735,394	31,116	3,181	8.3	0.9	102.2
1968	3,750,866	30,814	2,865	8.2	0.8	93.0
1969	3,710,120	31,868	2,960	8.6	0.8	92.9
1970	3,708,455	34,411	3,074	9.3	0.8	89.3
1971	3,759,893	35,290	3,114	9.4	0.8	88.2
1972	3,818,703	34,660	3,201	9.1	0.8	92.4
1973	3,871,815	33,991	3,429	8.8	0.9	100.9
1974	3,924,760	34,917	3,579	8.9	0.9	102.5
1975	3,976,913	35,776	4,512	9.0	1.1	126.1
1976	4,033,031	33,849	3,696	8.4	0.9	109.2
1977	4,085,918	34,951	3,023	8.6	0.7	86.5
1978	4,134,878	34,970	3,423	8.5	0.8	97.9
1979	4,147,344	35,111	3,055	8.5	0.7	87.0
1980	4,125,486	35,012	2,610	8.5	0.6	74.5
1981	4,136,196	36,631	3,419	8.9	0.8	93.3
1982	4,154,000	36,422	3,075	8.8	0.7	84.4
1983	4,178,000	37,239	3,149	8.9	0.8	84.6
1984	4,203,000	35,767	2,599	8.5	0.6	72.7
1985	4,227,000	35,015	2,926	8.3	0.7	83.6
1986	4,251,000	34,338	2,228	8.1	0.5	64.9
1987	4,275,000	34,466	2,118	8.1	0.5	61.5
1988	4,299,000	34,700	2,089	8.1	0.5	60.2
1989	4,323,000	34,550	2,098	8.0	0.5	60.7
1990	4,347,000	29,990	1,756	6.9	0.4	58.6
1991	4,377,033	28,238	1,590	6.5	0.4	56.3
1992*						
1993*						
1994*						
1995*						
1996	3,530,799	21,107	1,115	6.0	0.3	52.8
1997	3,529,909	23,181	1,835	6.6	0.5	79.2
1998	3,529,573	22,398	1,964	6.3	0.6	87.7
1999	3,527,549	22,472	1,995	6.4	0.6	88.8
2000	3,524,627	21,897	1,929	6.2	0.5	88.1
2001	3,521,310	20,302	2,126	5.8	0.6	104.7
2002	3,517,955	20,766	2,330	5.9	0.7	112.2
2003	3,514,019	20,526	1,998	5.8	0.6	97.3
2004	3,509,542	21,620	1,524	6.2	0.4	70.5
2005	3,505,037	21,099	1,719	6.0	0.5	81.5
2006	3,501,621	20,545	1,548	5.9	0.4	75.3
2007	3,498,023	22,613	1,721	6.5	0.5	76.1
2008	3,493,737	21,990	1,337	6.3	0.4	60.8
2009	3,491,327	20,471	1,399	5.9	0.4	68.3
2010	3,488,441	19,373	1,665	5.6	0.5	85.9
2011	3,484,154	19,004	2,306	5.5	0.7	121.3
2012	3,479,234	18,089	2,290	5.2	0.7	126.6
2013	3,473,720	17,470	2,607	5.0	0.8	149.2
2014	3,466,388	18,468	2,678	5.3	0.8	145.0
2015	3,456,394	19,537	2,956	5.7	0.9	151.3
2016	3,447,001	19,006	2,759	5.5	0.8	145.2
2017	3,437,453	19,666	3,005	5.7	0.9	152.8
2018	3,427,369	19,659	3,084	5.7	0.9	156.9
2019	3,415,752	18,687	2,775	5.5	0.8	148.5

==== Federation of Bosnia and Herzegovina ====
	Mid-year	Marriages	Divorces	Crude marriage rate (per 1,000)	Crude divorce rate (per 1,000)	Divorces per 1,000 marriages
1991	2,720,074	18,352	813	6.7	0.3	44.3
1992						
1993						
1994						
1995						
1996	2,283,335	14,692	378	6.4	0.2	25.7
1997	2,281,226	16,061	1,098	7.0	0.5	68.4
1998	2,279,083	14,921	1,163	6.5	0.5	77.9
1999	2,276,927	14,285	1,201	6.3	0.5	84.1
2000	2,274,789	13,894	1,180	6.1	0.5	84.9
2001	2,272,655	12,758	1,286	5.6	0.6	100.8
2002	2,239,417	12,889	1,424	5.8	0.6	110.5
2003	2,237,334	13,102	1,174	5.9	0.5	89.6
2004	2,235,250	13,695	857	6.1	0.4	62.6
2005	2,233,167	13,620	966	6.1	0.4	70.9
2006	2,232,376	13,012	933	5.8	0.4	71.7
2007	2,231,548	14,808	1,031	6.6	0.5	69.6
2008	2,229,787	14,909	938	6.7	0.4	62.9
2009	2,229,072	13,670	805	6.1	0.4	58.9
2010	2,228,027	12,988	994	5.8	0.4	76.5
2011	2,226,011	12,589	1,221	5.7	0.5	97.0
2012	2,222,587	12,060	1,176	5.4	0.5	97.5
2013	2,219,131	11,381	1,364	5.1	0.6	119.8
2014	2,215,997	11,982	1,321	5.4	0.6	110.2
2015	2,210,994	12,972	1,502	5.9	0.7	115.8
2016	2,206,231	12,790	1,445	5.8	0.7	113.0
2017	2,201,193	12,994	1,725	5.9	0.8	132.8
2018	2,196,233	13,061	1,823	5.9	0.8	139.6
2019	2,190,098	12,266	1,673	5.6	0.8	136.4

==== Republika Srpska ====
	Mid-year	Marriages	Divorces	Crude marriage rate (per 1,000)	Crude divorce rate (per 1,000)	Divorces per 1,000 marriages
1991	1,569,332	9,232	621	5.9	0.4	67.3
1992						
1993						
1994						
1995						
1996	1,247,464	6,415	737	5.1	0.6	114.9
1997	1,248,683	7,120	737	5.7	0.6	103.5
1998	1,250,490	7,477	801	6.0	0.6	107.1
1999	1,250,622	8,187	794	6.5	0.6	97.0
2000	1,249,838	8,003	749	6.4	0.6	93.6
2001	1,248,655	7,544	840	6.0	0.7	111.3
2002	1,194,178	7,233	848	6.1	0.7	117.2
2003	1,192,622	6,769	744	5.7	0.6	109.9
2004	1,190,526	7,143	637	6.0	0.5	89.2
2005	1,187,940	6,810	721	5.7	0.6	105.9
2006	1,185,145	6,860	526	5.8	0.4	76.7
2007	1,182,217	7,093	596	6.0	0.5	84.0
2008	1,179,717	6,401	317	5.4	0.3	49.5
2009	1,177,995	6,131	455	5.2	0.4	74.2
2010	1,176,419	5,767	517	4.9	0.4	89.6
2011	1,174,420	5,802	886	4.9	0.8	152.7
2012	1,173,131	5,326	878	4.5	0.7	164.9
2013	1,171,179	5,467	1,052	4.7	0.9	192.4
2014	1,167,082	5,823	1,106	5.0	0.9	189.9
2015	1,162,164	5,895	1,143	5.1	1.0	193.9
2016	1,157,516	5,563	1,025	4.8	0.9	184.3
2017	1,153,017	5,954	985	5.2	0.9	165.4
2018	1,147,902	5,966	963	5.2	0.8	161.4
2019	1,142,495	5,822	920	5.1	0.8	158.0

==== Brčko District ====
	Mid-year	Marriages	Divorces	Crude marriage rate (per 1,000)	Crude divorce rate (per 1,000)	Divorces per 1,000 marriages
1991	87,627	654	156	7.5	1.8	238.5
1992						
1993						
1994						
1995						
1996						
1997						
1998						
1999						
2000						
2001						
2002	84,360	644	58	7.6	0.7	90.1
2003	84,063	655	80	7.8	1.0	122.1
2004	83,766	782	30	9.3	0.4	38.4
2005	83,930	669	32	8.0	0.4	47.8
2006	84,100	673	89	8.0	1.1	132.2
2007	84,258	712	94	8.5	1.1	132.0
2008	84,233	680	82	8.1	1.0	120.6
2009	84,260	670	139	8.0	1.6	207.5
2010	83,995	618	154	7.4	1.8	249.2
2011	83,723	613	199	7.3	2.4	324.6
2012	83,516	703	236	8.4	2.8	335.7
2013	83,410	622	191	7.5	2.3	307.1
2014	83,309	663	251	8.0	3.0	378.6
2015	83,236	670	311	8.0	3.7	464.2
2016	83,254	653	289	7.8	3.5	442.6
2017	83,243	718	295	8.6	3.5	410.9
2018	83,234	632	298	7.6	3.6	471.5
2019	83,159	599	182	7.2	2.2	303.8

=== Fertility ===
Years	1900	1901	1902	1903	1904	1905	1906	1907	1908	1909
Total Fertility Rate in Bosnia and Herzegovina	5.24	5.24	5.23	5.23	5.23	5.22	5.22	5.21	5.21	5.20

Years	1910	1911	1912	1913	1914	1915	1916	1917	1918	1919
Total Fertility Rate in Bosnia and Herzegovina	5.20	5.20	5.19	5.19	5.19	5.18	5.18	5.18	5.17	5.17

Years	1920	1921	1922	1923	1924	1925	1926	1927	1928	1929
Total Fertility Rate in Bosnia and Herzegovina	5.17	5.16	5.16	5.16	5.15	5.15	5.14	5.14	5.14	5.13

Years	1930	1931	1932	1933	1934	1935	1936	1937	1938	1939
Total Fertility Rate in Bosnia and Herzegovina	5.13	5.13	5.12	5.12	5.12	5.11	5.11	5.11	5.10	5.10

Years	1940	1941	1942	1943	1944	1945	1946	1947	1948	1949
Total Fertility Rate in Bosnia and Herzegovina	5.10	5.09	5.09	5.09	5.08	5.08	5.08	5.07	5.07	5.07

=== Life expectancy at birth in Bosnia and Herzegovina ===
Life expectancy in Bosnia and Herzegovina since 1950

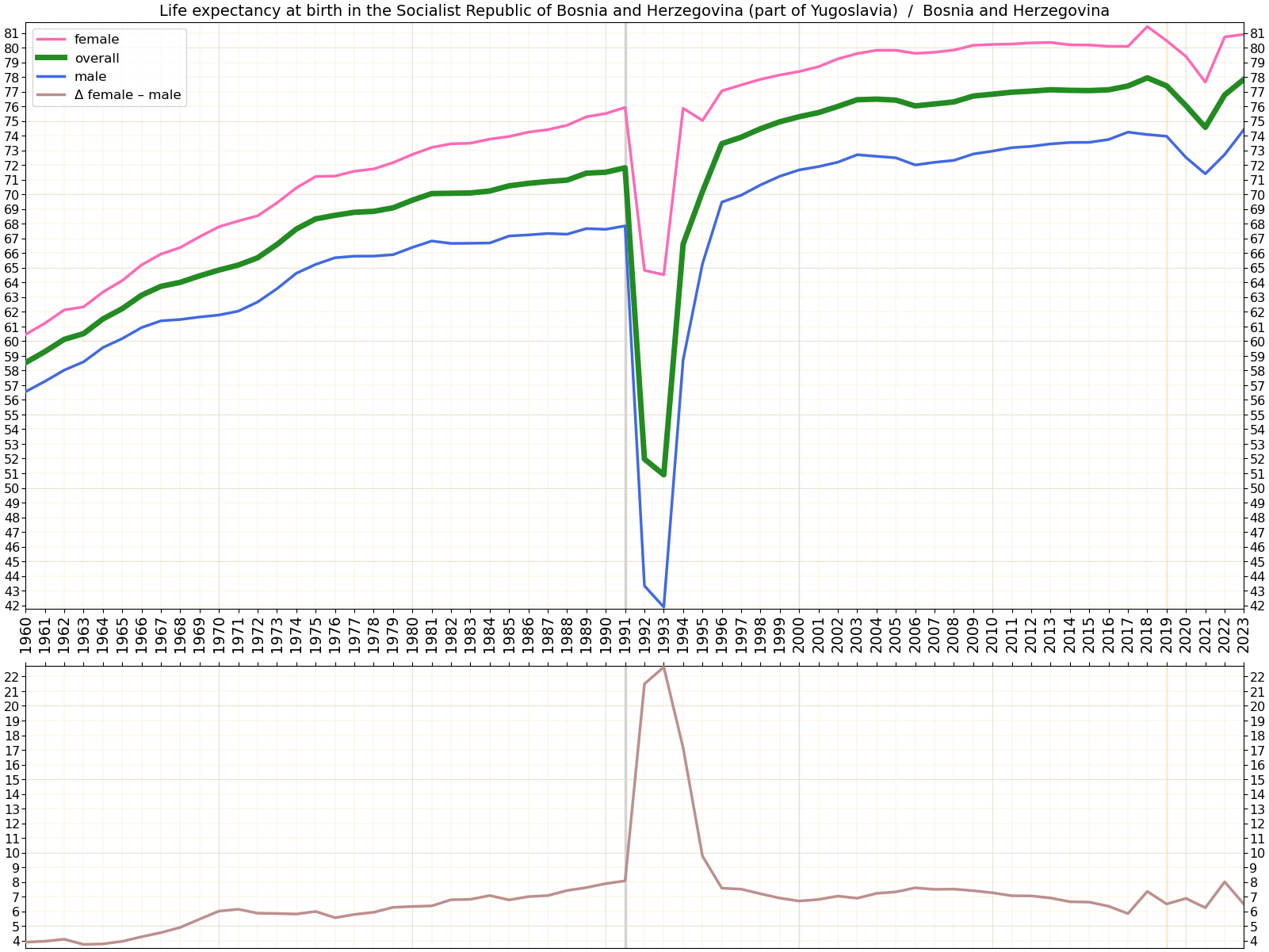
Life expectancy in Bosnia and Herzegovina since 1960 by gender

Period	Life expectancy in Years
1950–1955	53.67
1955–1960	▲58.46
1960–1965	▲61.93
1965–1970	▲64.73
1970–1975	▲67.57
1975–1980	▲69.87
1980–1985	▲70.72
1985–1990	▲71.95
1990–1995	▼70.13
1995–2000	▲73.61
2000–2005	▲74.81
2005–2010	▲75.53
2010–2015	▲76.53
2015–2020	▲77.18

== Ethnic groups ==
According to data from the 2013 census published by the Agency for Statistics of Bosnia and Herzegovina, Bosniaks constitute 50.11% of the population, Bosnian Serbs 30.78%, Bosnian Croats 15.43%, and others form 2.73%, with the remaining respondents not declaring their ethnicity or not answering.

The census results are contested by the Republika Srpska statistical office and by Bosnian Serb politicians, who oppose the inclusion of non-permanent Bosnian residents in the figures.

The European Union's statistics office, Eurostat, determined that the methodology used by the Bosnian statistical agency was in line with international recommendations.

In Bosnia and Herzegovina, religion is often linked to ethnicity, i.e. (with the exception of agnostics and atheists) most Bosniaks are Muslim, Serbs are Orthodox Christian, and Croats are Roman Catholic.

Population of Bosnia and Herzegovina according to ethnic group 1948–2013
Ethnic group	Census 1948		Census 1953		Census 1961		Census 1971		Census 1981		Census 1991		Census UNHCR 1996		Census 2013		Change 1991–2013	
Ethnic group	Number	%	Number	%	Number	%	Number	%	Number	%	Number	%	Number	%	Number	%	Number	%
Bosniaks/Muslims	788,403	30.7	891,800	31.3	842,248	25.7	1,482,430	39.6	1,629,924	39.5	1,902,956	43.48	1,805,910	46.1	1,769,592	50.11	-133,364	+6.63pp
Serbs	1,136,116	44.3	1,264,372	44.4	1,406,057	42.9	1,393,148	37.2	1,320,644	32.0	1,366,104	31.22	1,484,530	37.9	1,086,733	30.78	-279,371	-0.44pp
Croats	614,123	23.9	654,229	23.0	711,665	21.7	772,491	20.6	758,136	18.4	760,852	17.39	571,317	14.6	544,780	15.43	-216,072	-1.96pp
Yugoslavs					275,883	8.4	43,796	1.2	326,280	7.9	242,682	5.55			2,570	0.07	-240,112	-99.94pp
Montenegrins	3,094	0.1	7,336	0.3	12,828	0.4	13,021	0.3	14,114	0.3	10,071	0.23			1,883	0.05	-8,188	-81.3pp
Roma	442	0.0	2,297	0.1	588	0.0	1,456	0.0	7,251	0.2	8,864	0.20			12,583	0.36	+3,719	+41.96pp
Albanians					3,642	0.1	3,764	0.1	4,396	0.1	4,925	0.11			2,569	0.07	-2,356	-47.84pp
Others/undeclared	23,099	0.9	27,756	1.0	28,679	0.8	36,005	1	63,263	1.5	80,579	1.84	58,196	1.5	110,449	3.13	+29,870	+37.07pp
Total	2,565,277		2,847,790		3,277,948		3,746,111		4,124,008		4,377,033		3,919,953		3,531,159		-845,874	-19.32pp

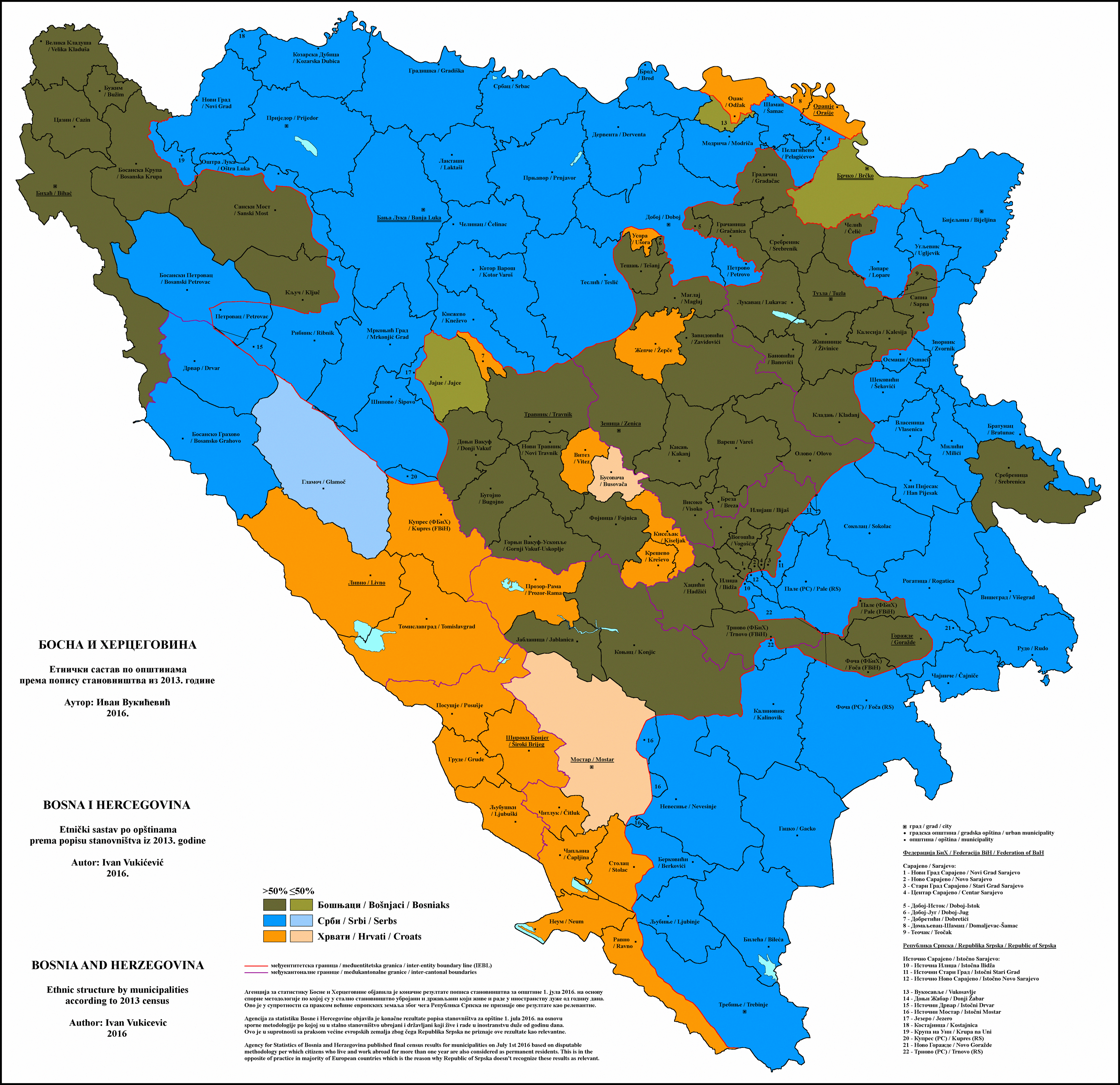
Ethnic structure of Bosnia and Herzegovina by municipalities in 2013

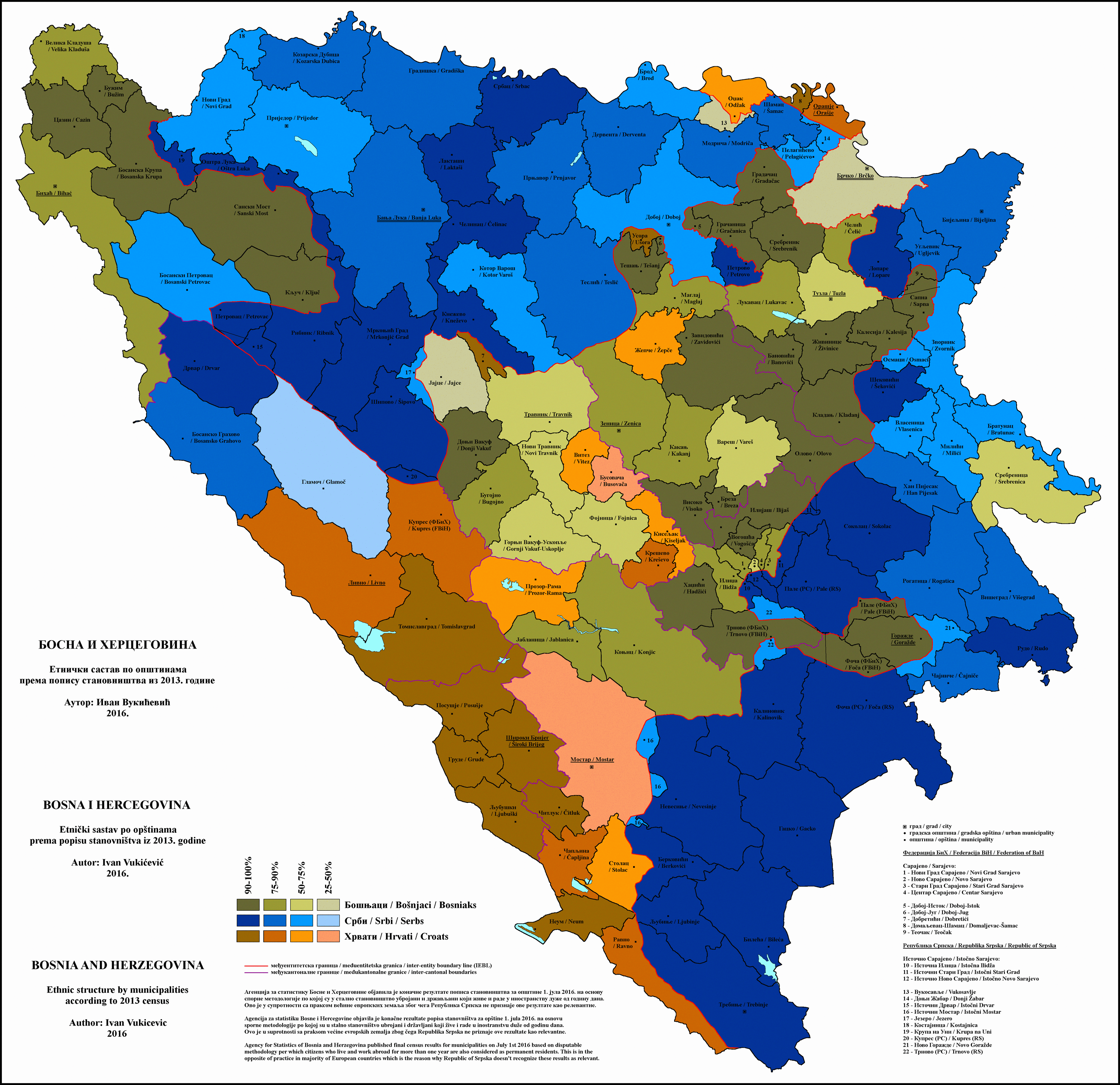
Ethnic structure of Bosnia and Herzegovina by municipalities in 2013

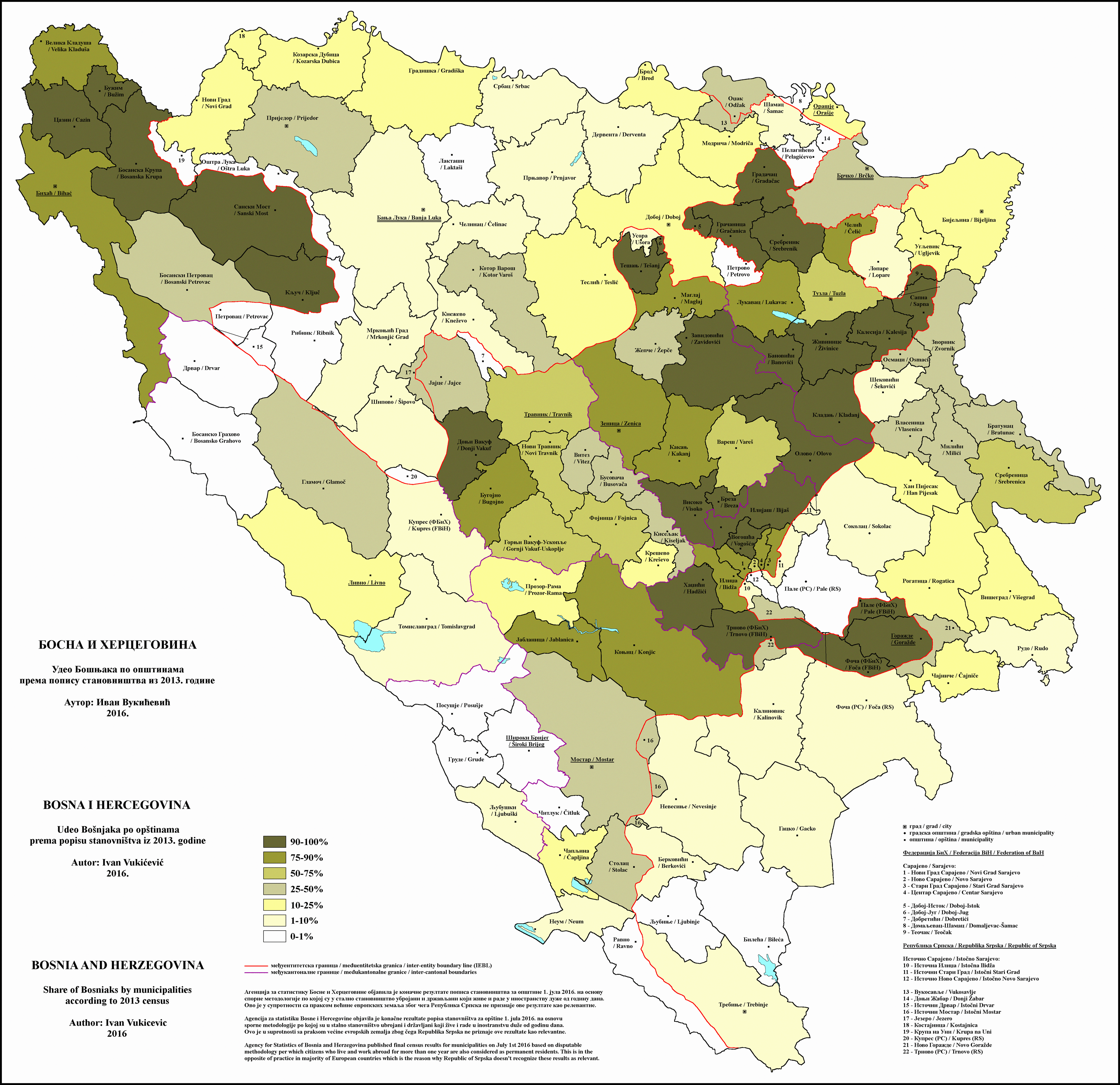
Share of Bosniaks in Bosnia and Herzegovina by municipalities in 2013

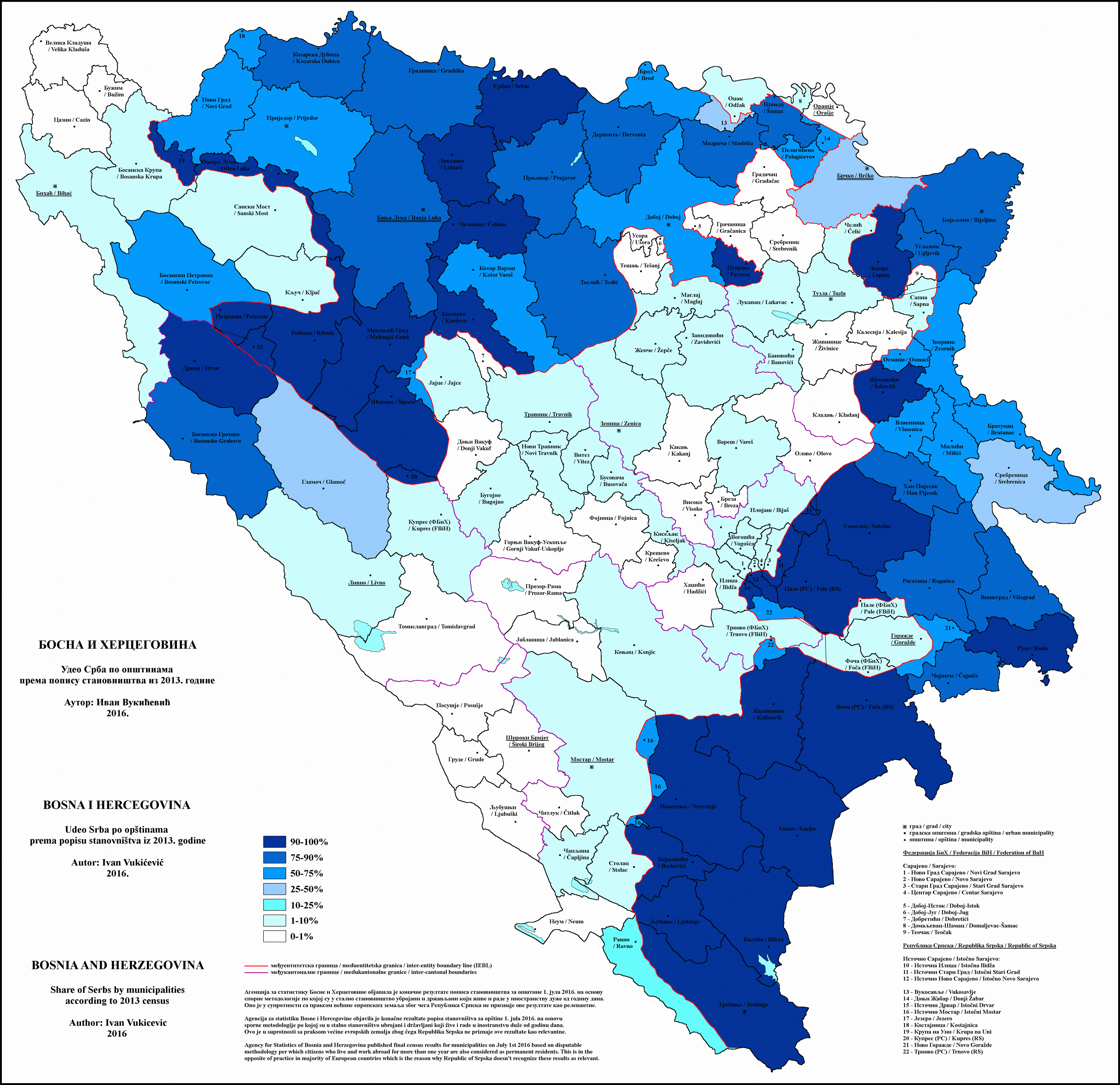
Share of Serbs in Bosnia and Herzegovina by municipalities in 2013

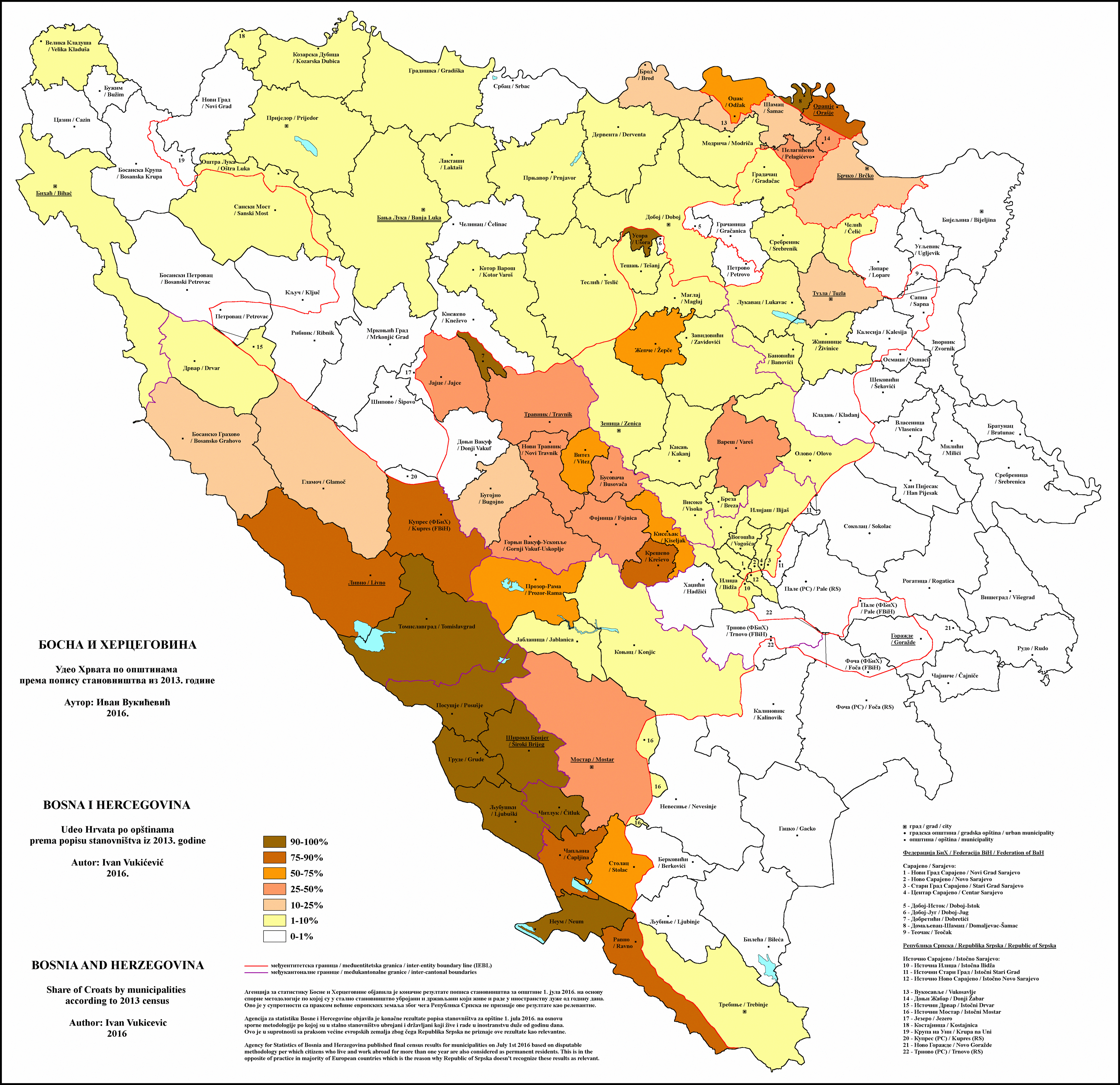
Share of Croats in Bosnia and Herzegovina by municipalities in 2013

=== Languages ===
Bosnia's constitution does not specify any official languages; however, academics Hilary Footitt and Michael Kelly note that the Dayton Agreement states that it is "done in Bosnian, Croatian, English and Serbian", and they describe this as the "de facto recognition of three official languages" at the state level. The equal status of Bosnian, Serbian and Croatian was verified by the Constitutional Court in 2000. It ruled that the provisions of the Federation and Republika Srpska constitutions on language were incompatible with the state constitution, since they only recognised "Bosniak" and Croatian (in the case of the Federation) and Serbian (in the case of Republika Srpska) as official languages at the entity level.

As a result, the wording of the entity constitutions was changed and all three languages were made official in both entities. The three languages are mutually intelligible and are also known collectively as Serbo-Croatian. Use of one of the three varieties has become a marker of ethnic identity. Michael Kelly and Catherine Baker argue: "The three official languages of today's Bosnian state...represent the symbolic assertion of national identity over the pragmatism of mutual intelligibility".

All standard varieties are based on the Ijekavian varieties of the Shtokavian dialect (non-standard spoken varieties including, beside Ijekavian, also Ikavian Shtokavian). Serbian and Bosnian are written in both Latin and Cyrillic (the latter predominantly using the Latin script), whereas Croatian is written only in Latin alphabet. There are also some speakers of Italian, German, Turkish and Ladino. Yugoslav Sign Language is used with Croatian and Serbian variants.

According to the results of the 2013 census, 52.86% of the population consider their mother tongue to be Bosnian, 30.76% Serbian, 14.6% Croatian and 1.57% another language, with 0.21% not giving an answer.

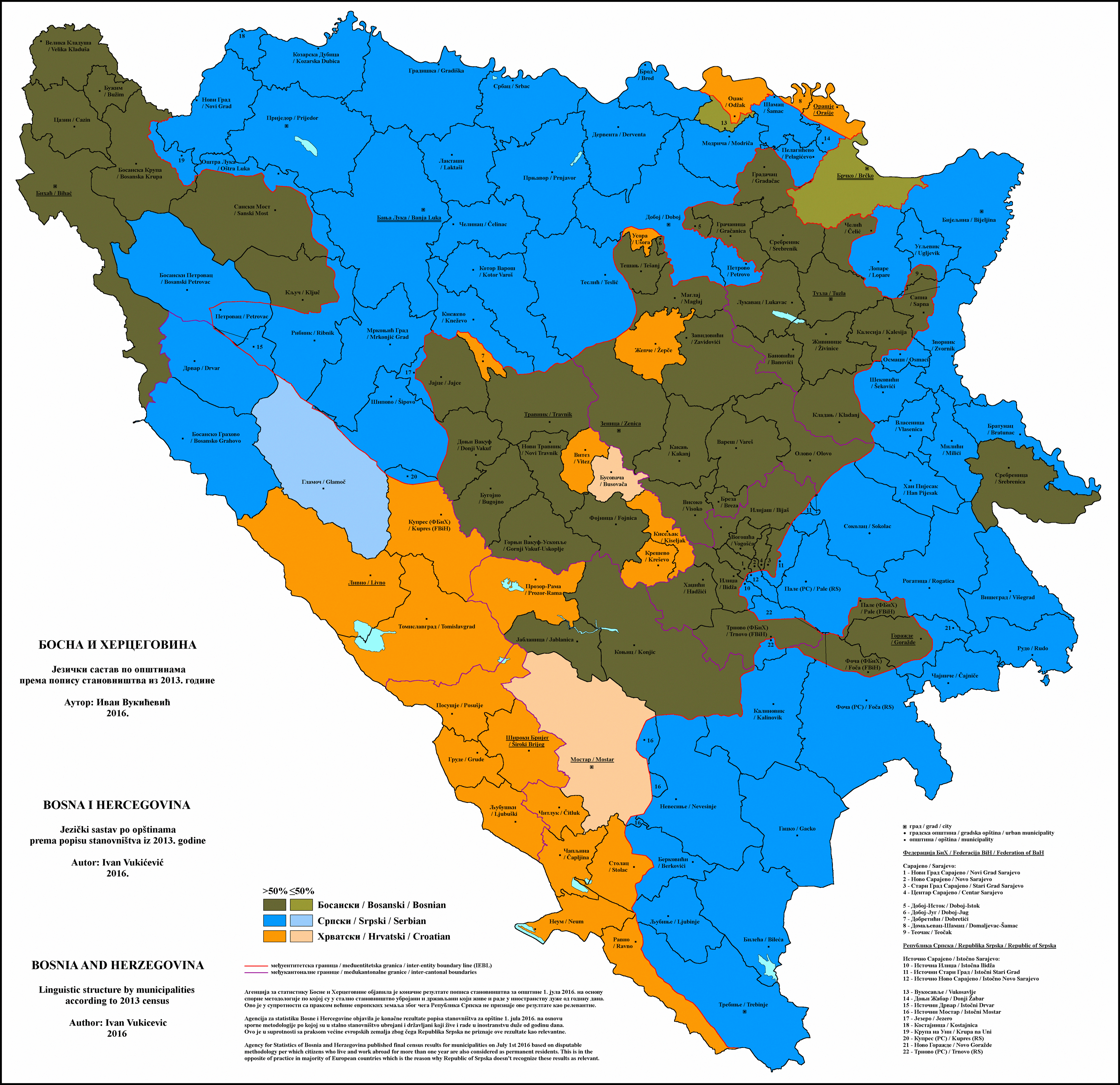
Linguistic structure of Bosnia and Herzegovina by municipalities in 2013

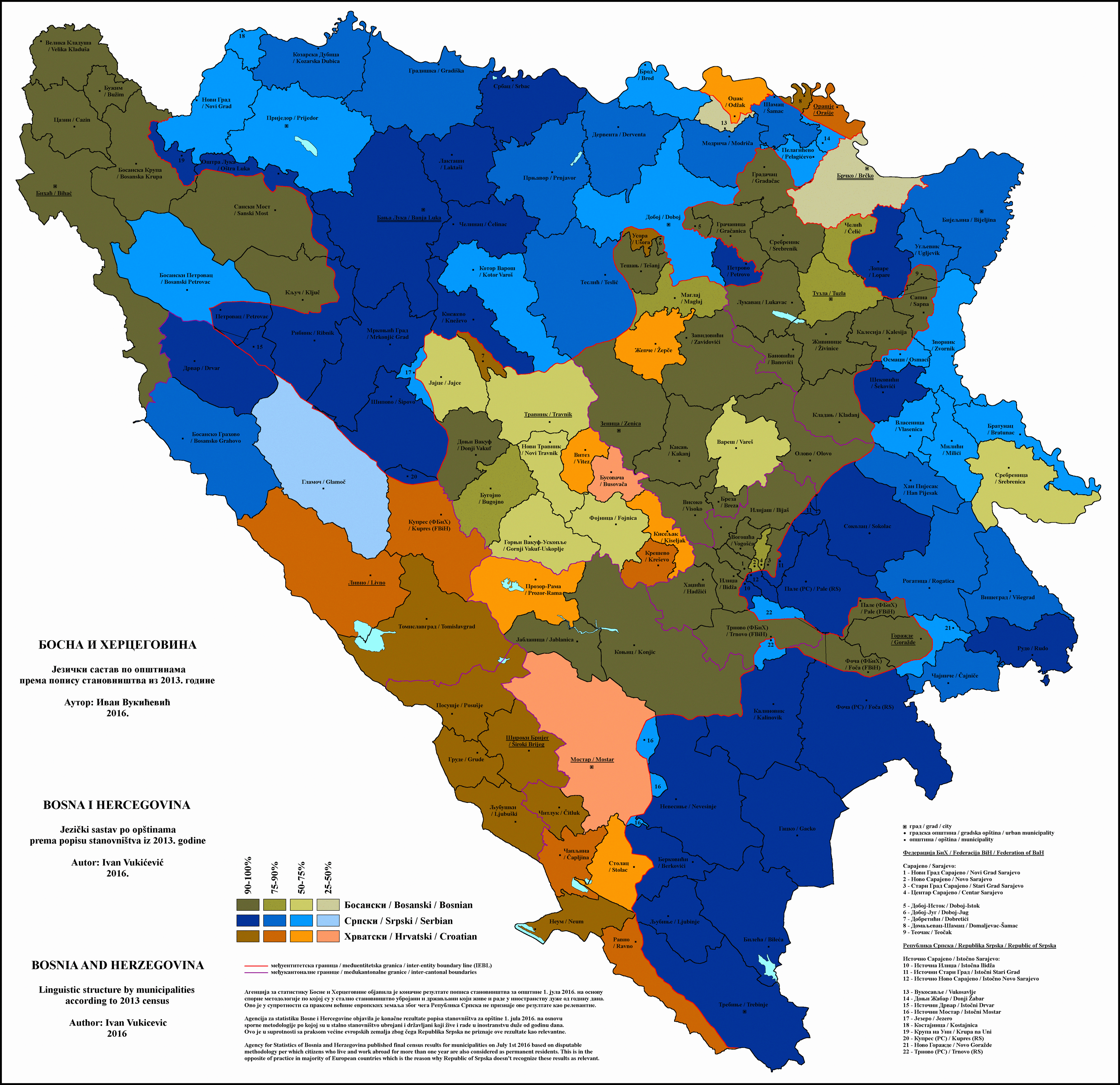
Linguistic structure of Bosnia and Herzegovina by municipalities in 2013

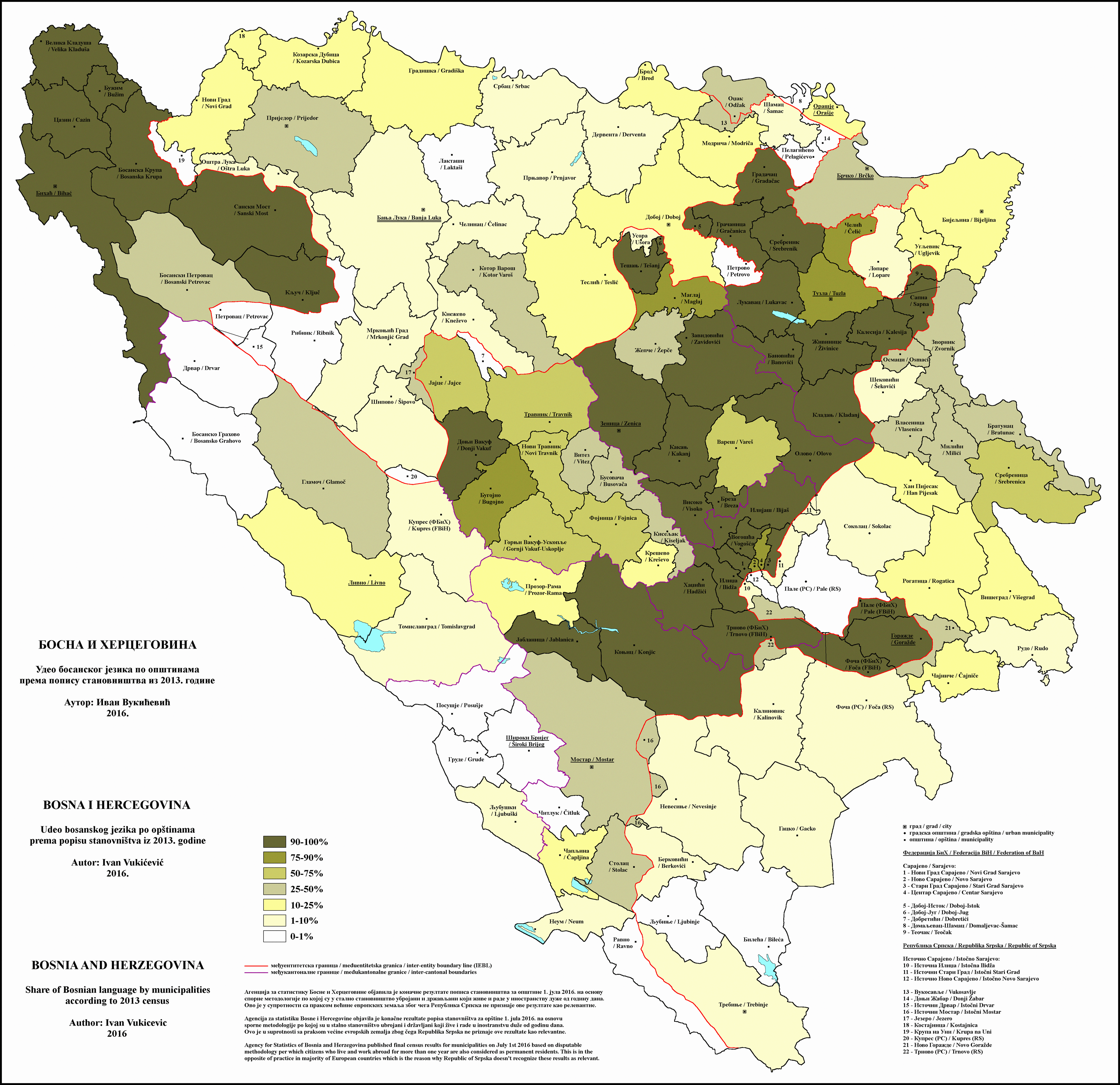
Share of Bosnian in Bosnia and Herzegovina by municipalities in 2013

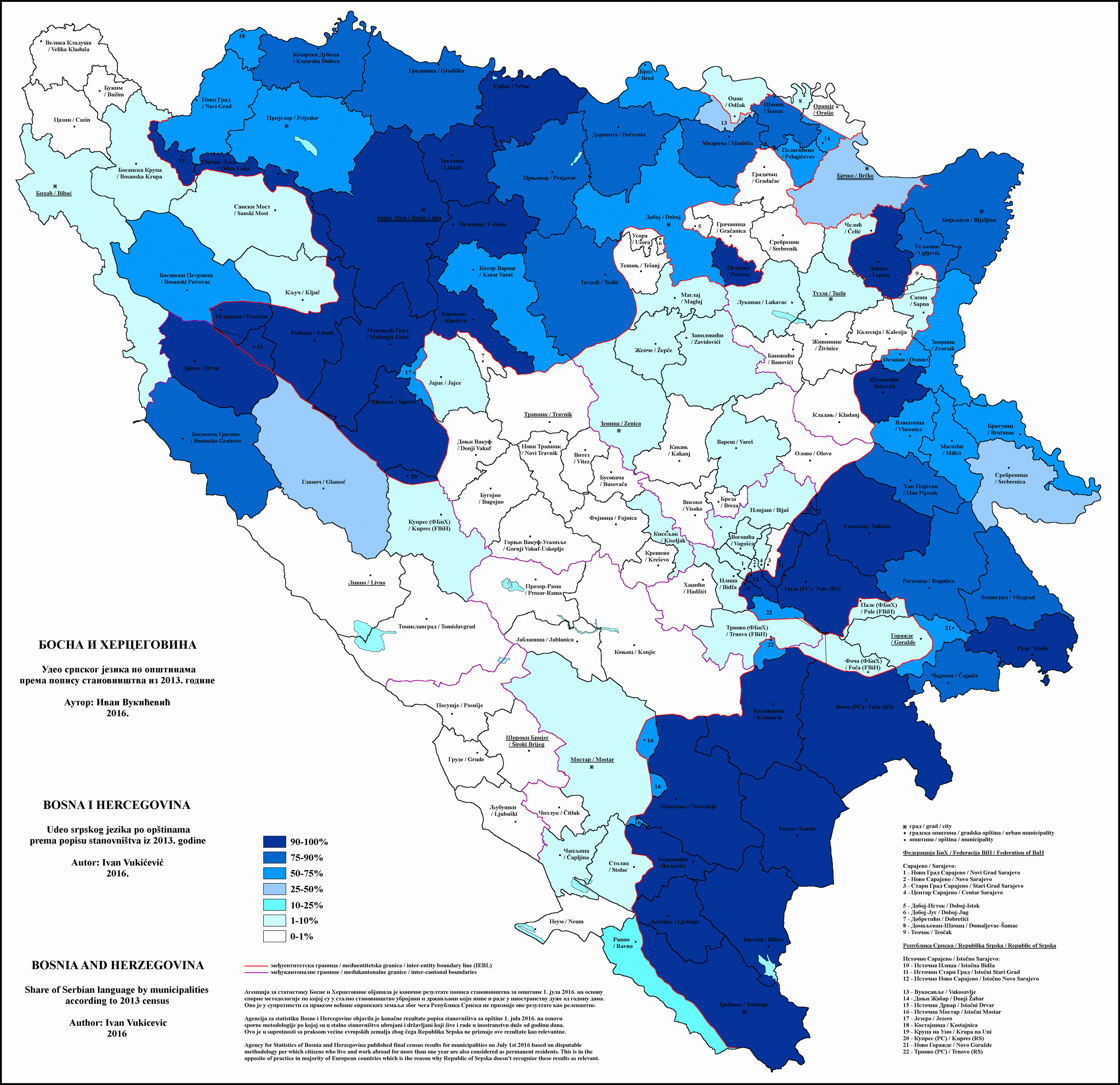
Share of Serbian in Bosnia and Herzegovina by municipalities in 2013

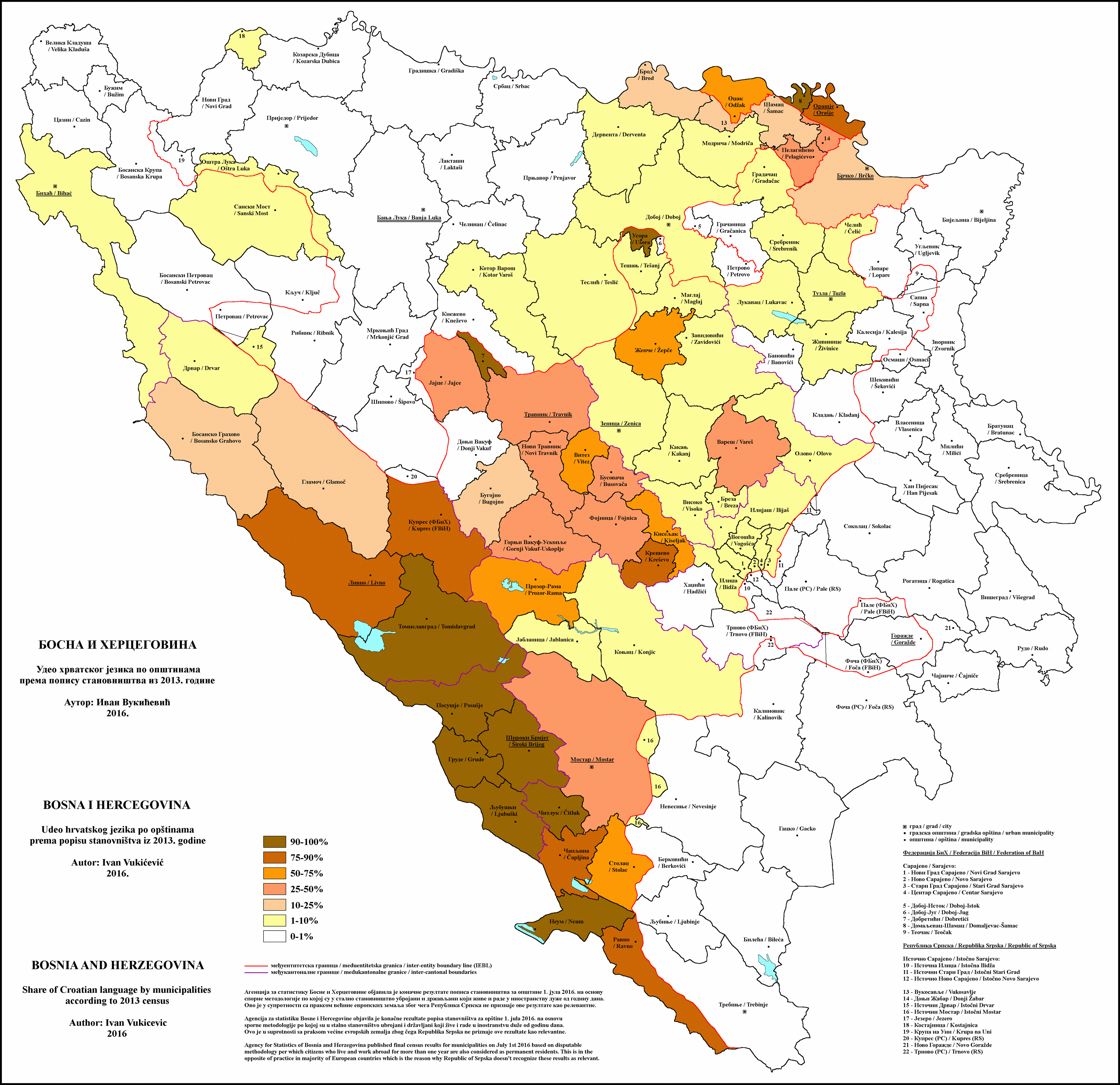
Share of Croatian in Bosnia and Herzegovina by municipalities in 2013

=== Religion ===
According to the 2013 census, 51.33% of the population identify religiously as Muslim, 30.75% as Serbian Orthodox Christian, 15.19% as Roman Catholic, 1.15% as other, 1.1% as agnostic or atheist, with the remainder not declaring their religion or not answering. A 2012 survey found that 47% of Bosnia's Muslims are non-denominational Muslims, while 45% follow Sunnism. In Bosnia and Herzegovina, religion is strongly linked to ethnicity.

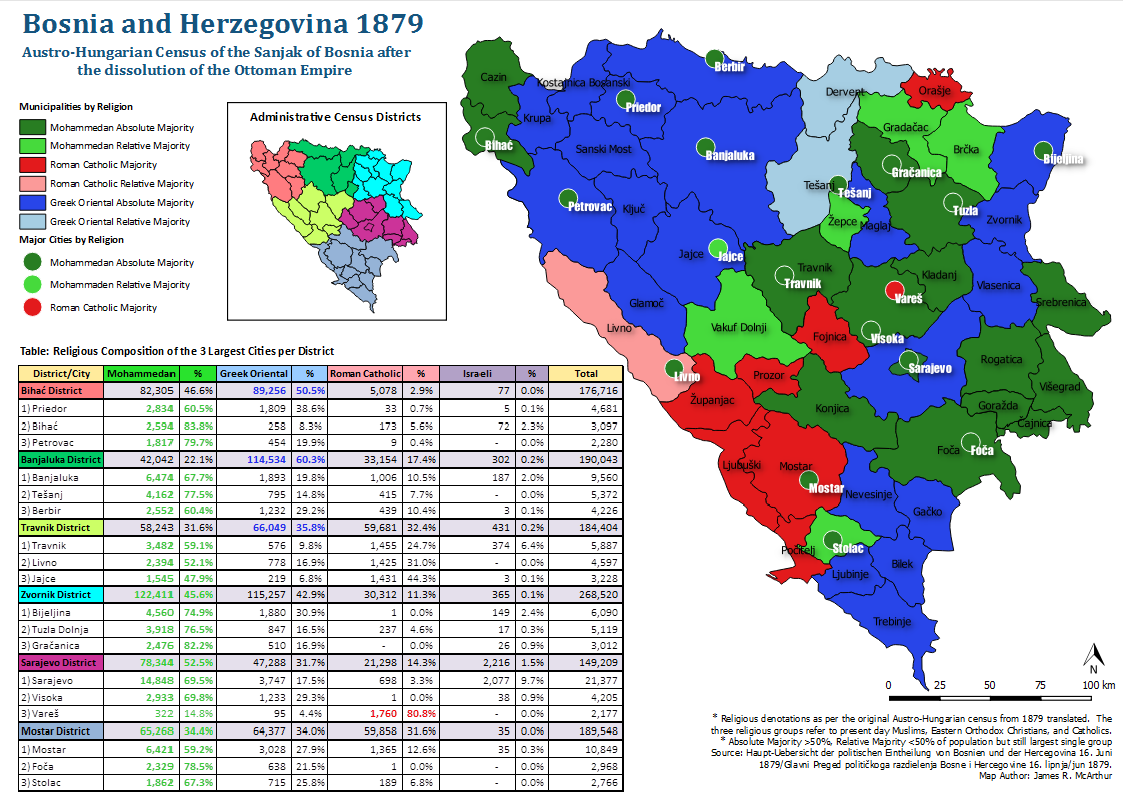
Religious structure of Bosnia and Herzegovina in 1879

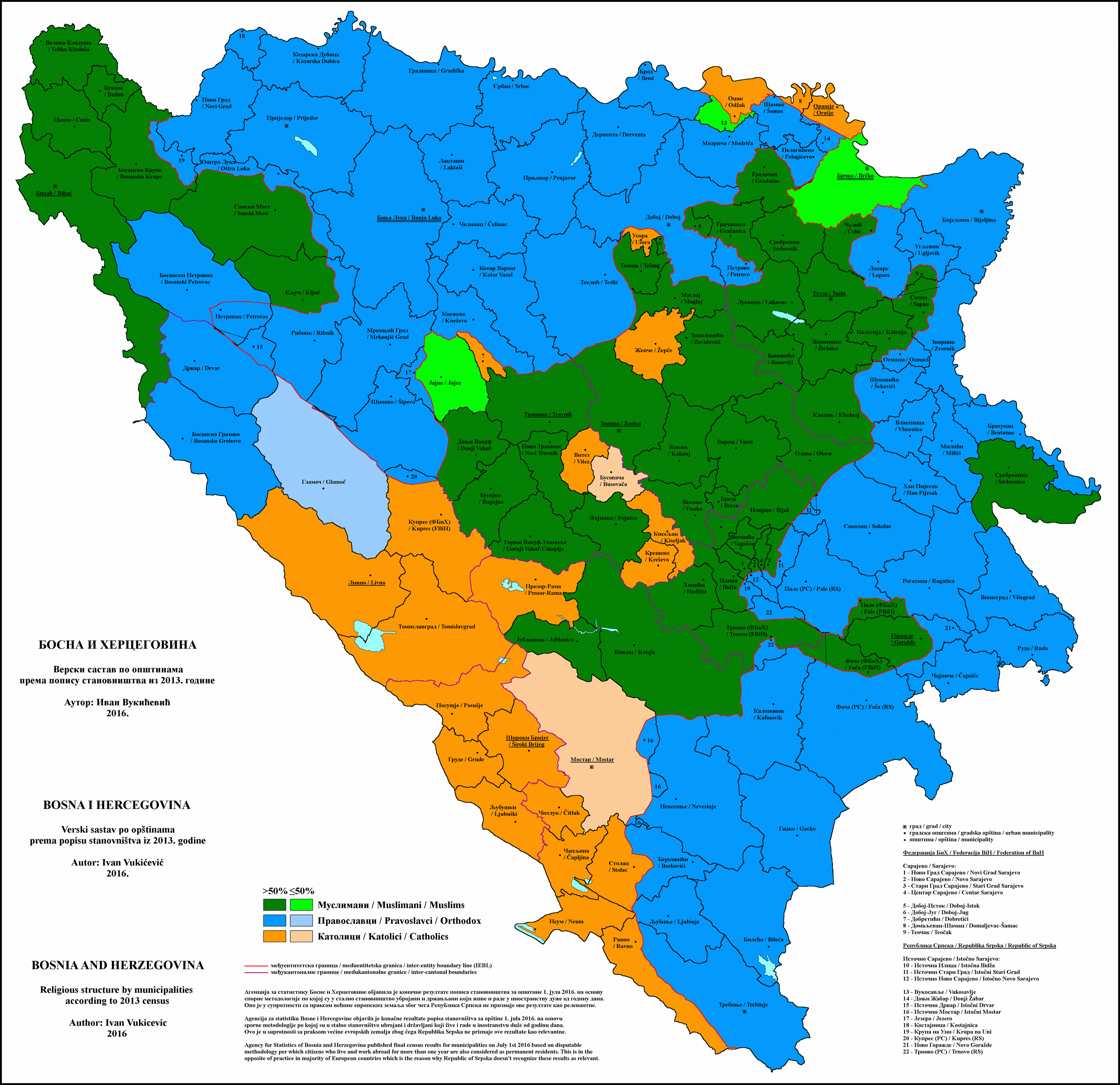
Religious structure of Bosnia and Herzegovina by municipalities in 2013

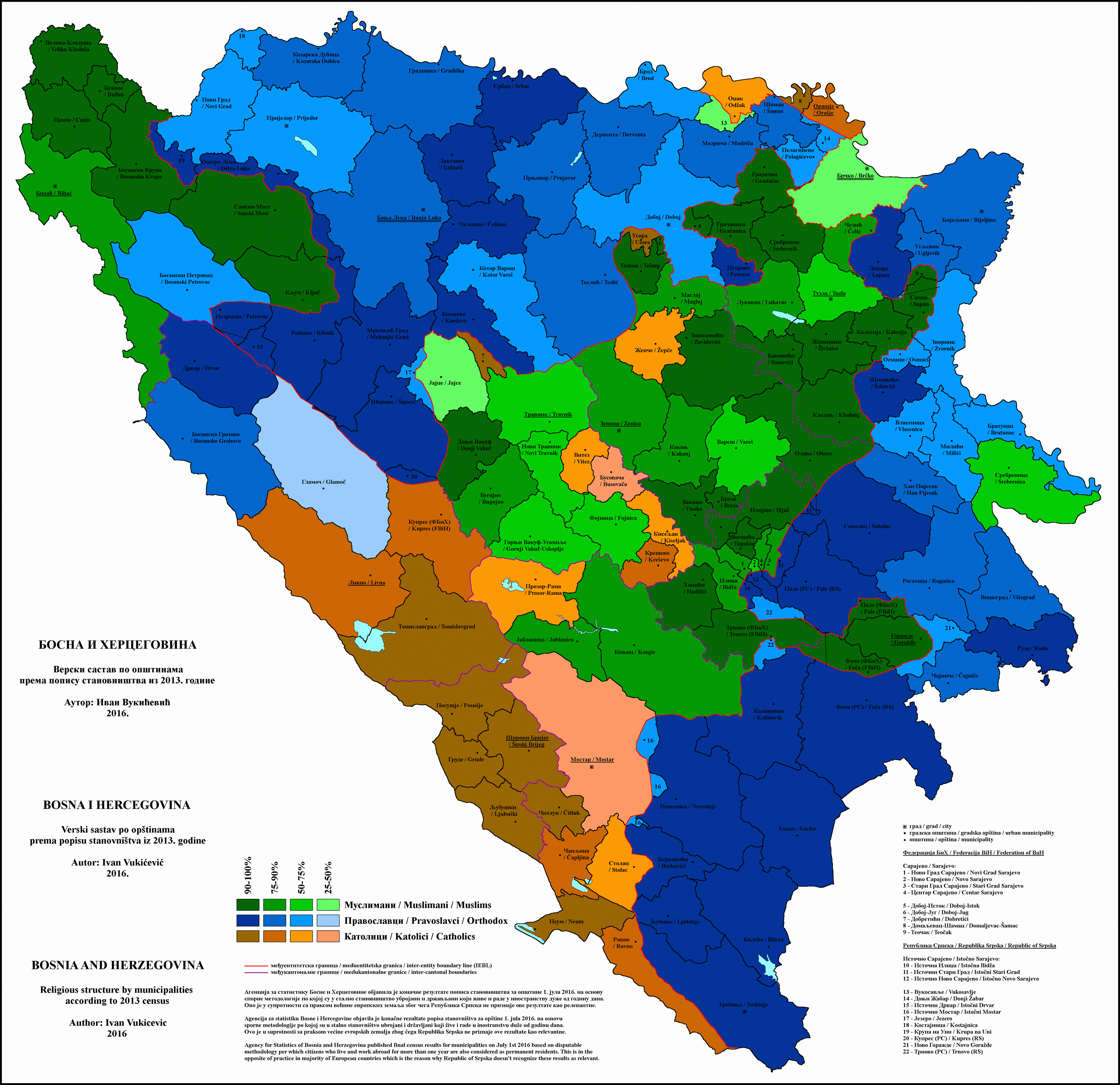
Religious structure of Bosnia and Herzegovina by municipalities in 2013

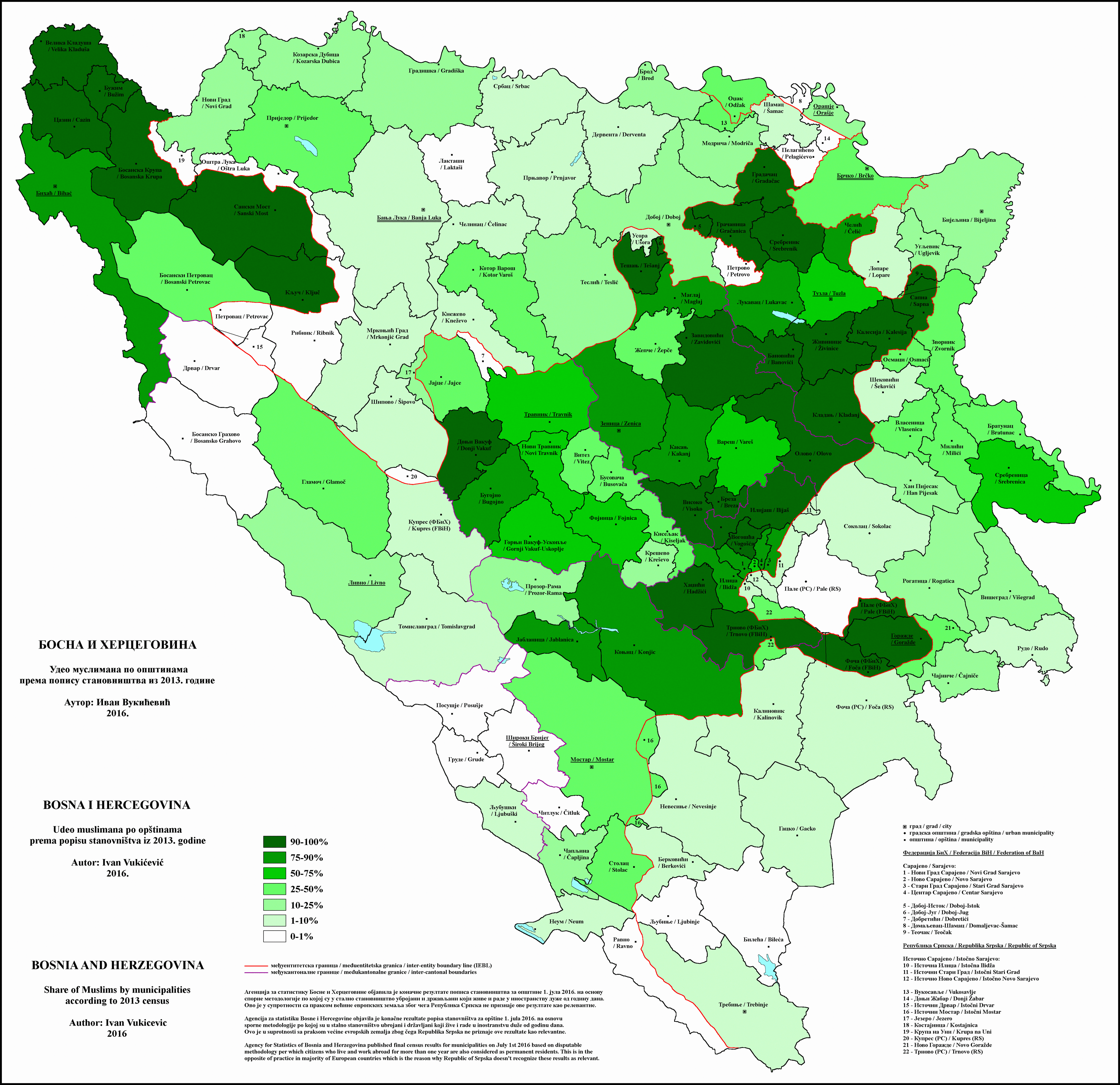
Share of Muslims in Bosnia and Herzegovina by municipalities in 2013

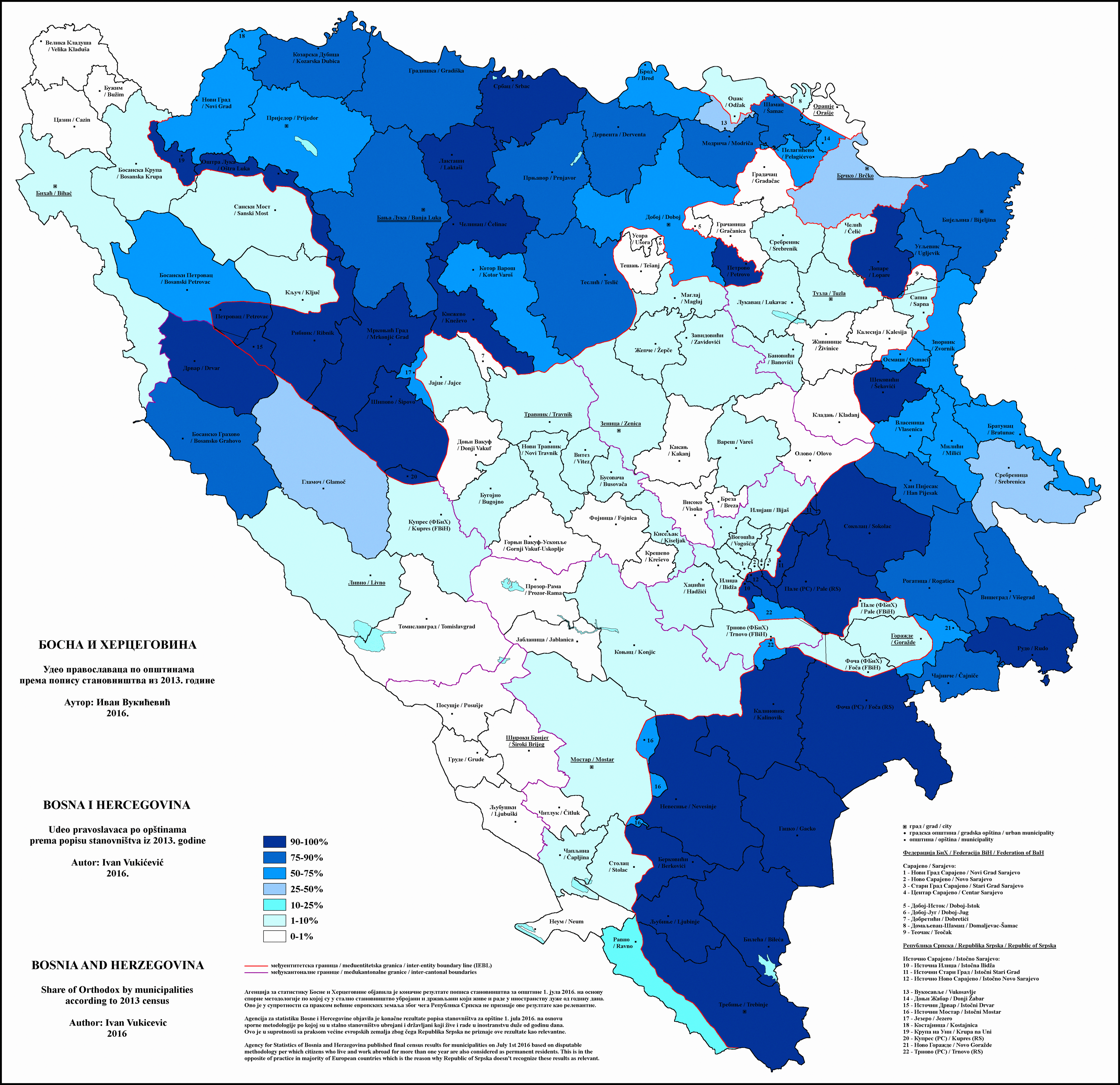
Share of Orthodox Christians in Bosnia and Herzegovina by municipalities in 2013

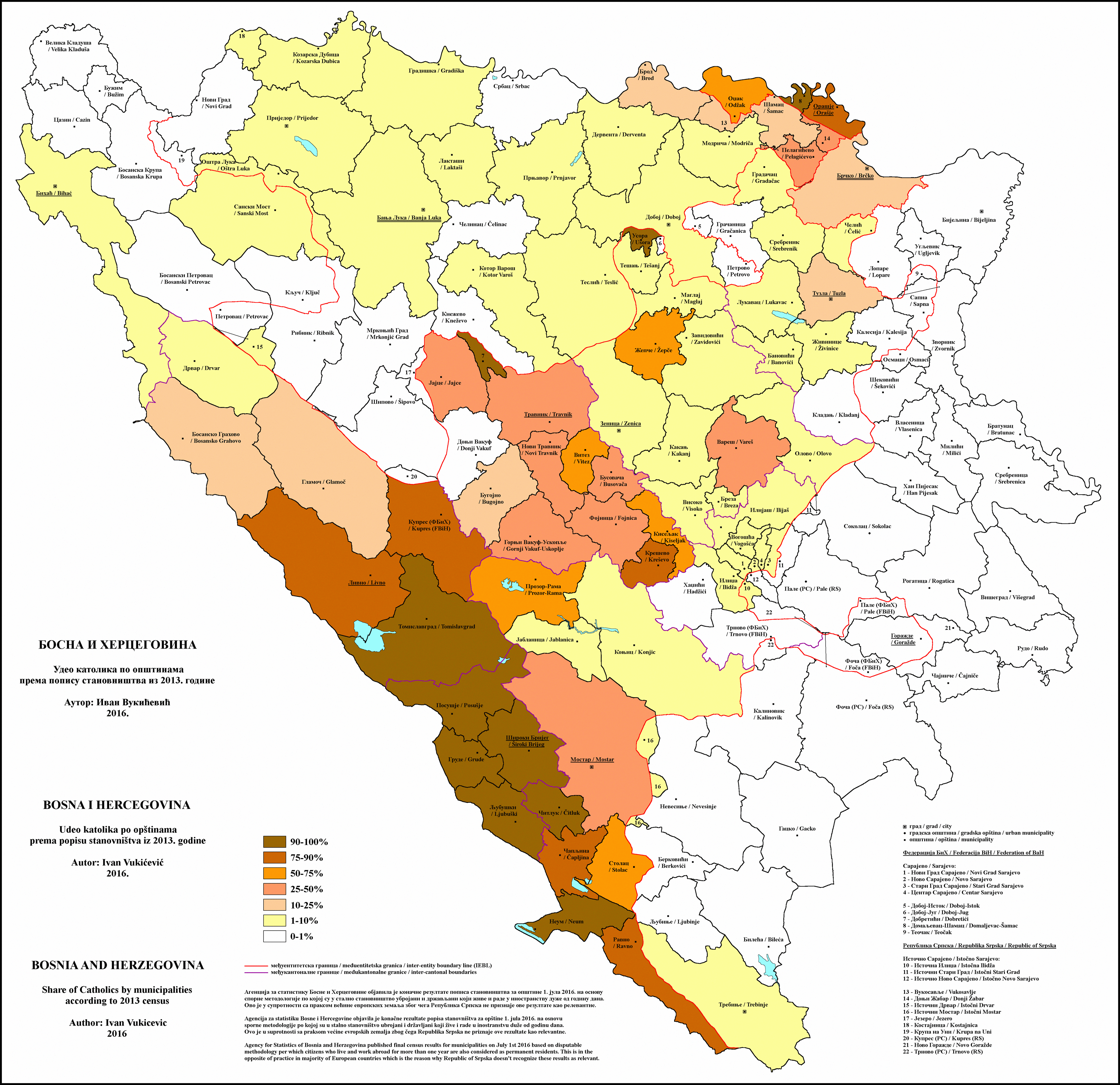
Share of Catholics in Bosnia and Herzegovina by municipalities in 2013

== Demographic statistics ==
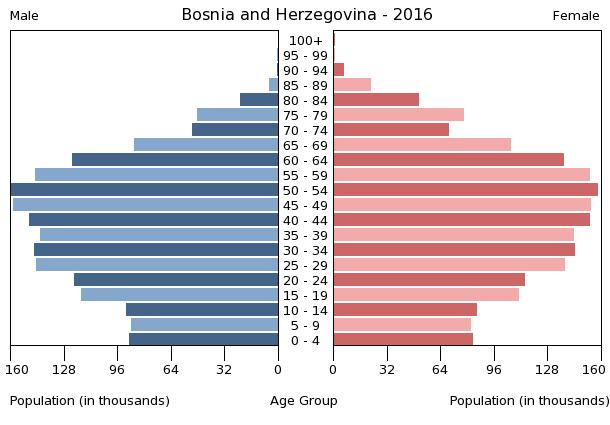
Population pyramid 2016

The following demographic statistics are from the CIA World Factbook, unless otherwise indicated.

=== Population ===
3,378,821

=== Age structure ===
0-14 years: 13.18% (male 261,430/female 244,242)
15-24 years: 10.83% (male 214,319/female 201,214)
25-54 years: 44.52% (male 859,509/female 848,071)
55-64 years: 15.24% (male 284,415/female 300,168)
65 years and over: 16.22% (male 249,624/female 372,594) (2020 est.)

=== Median age ===
Total: 43.3 years
Male: 41.6 years
Female: 44.8 years (2020 est.)

=== Sex ratio ===
At birth: 1.07 male(s)/female
0-14 years: 1.07 male(s)/female
15-24 years: 1.07 male(s)/female
25-54 years: 1.01 male(s)/female
55-64 years: 0.95 male(s)/female
65 years and over: 0.67 male(s)/female
Total population: 0.95 male(s)/female (2020 est.)

=== Infant mortality rate ===
Total: 5.32 deaths/1,000 live births
Male: 5.44 deaths/1,000 live births
Female: 5.19 deaths/1,000 live births (2021 est.)

=== Life expectancy at birth ===
Total population: 77.74 years
Male: 74.76 years
Female: 80.93 years (2021 est.)

=== HIV/AIDS ===
Adult prevalence rate: less than 0.1% (2018)
People living with HIV/AIDS: Less than 500 (2018)
Deaths: less than 100 (2018)

=== Literacy ===
Definition: age 15 and over can read and write
Total population: 98.5%
Male: 99.5%
Female: 97.5% (2015 est.)

== See also ==
- Demographic history of Bosnia and Herzegovina
- Yugoslavia § Demographics
  - Demographics of the Kingdom of Yugoslavia
  - Demographics of the Socialist Federal Republic of Yugoslavia
- Demographics of Croatia
- Demographics of Montenegro
- Demographics of Serbia
- Exodus of Muslims from Serbia
- Bosnia and Herzegovina
- Federation of Bosnia and Herzegovina
- Republika Srpska
- Brčko District
- List of Bosnians and Herzegovinians

Religion:

- Islam in Bosnia and Herzegovina
- Eastern Orthodoxy in Bosnia and Herzegovina
- Roman Catholicism in Bosnia and Herzegovina
- Jews in Bosnia and Herzegovina

Groups:

- Ethnic groups in Bosnia and Herzegovina
- Roma in Bosnia and Herzegovina
