= Borkovići =

Borkovići Борковићи (Serbian)
- Village (Selo)
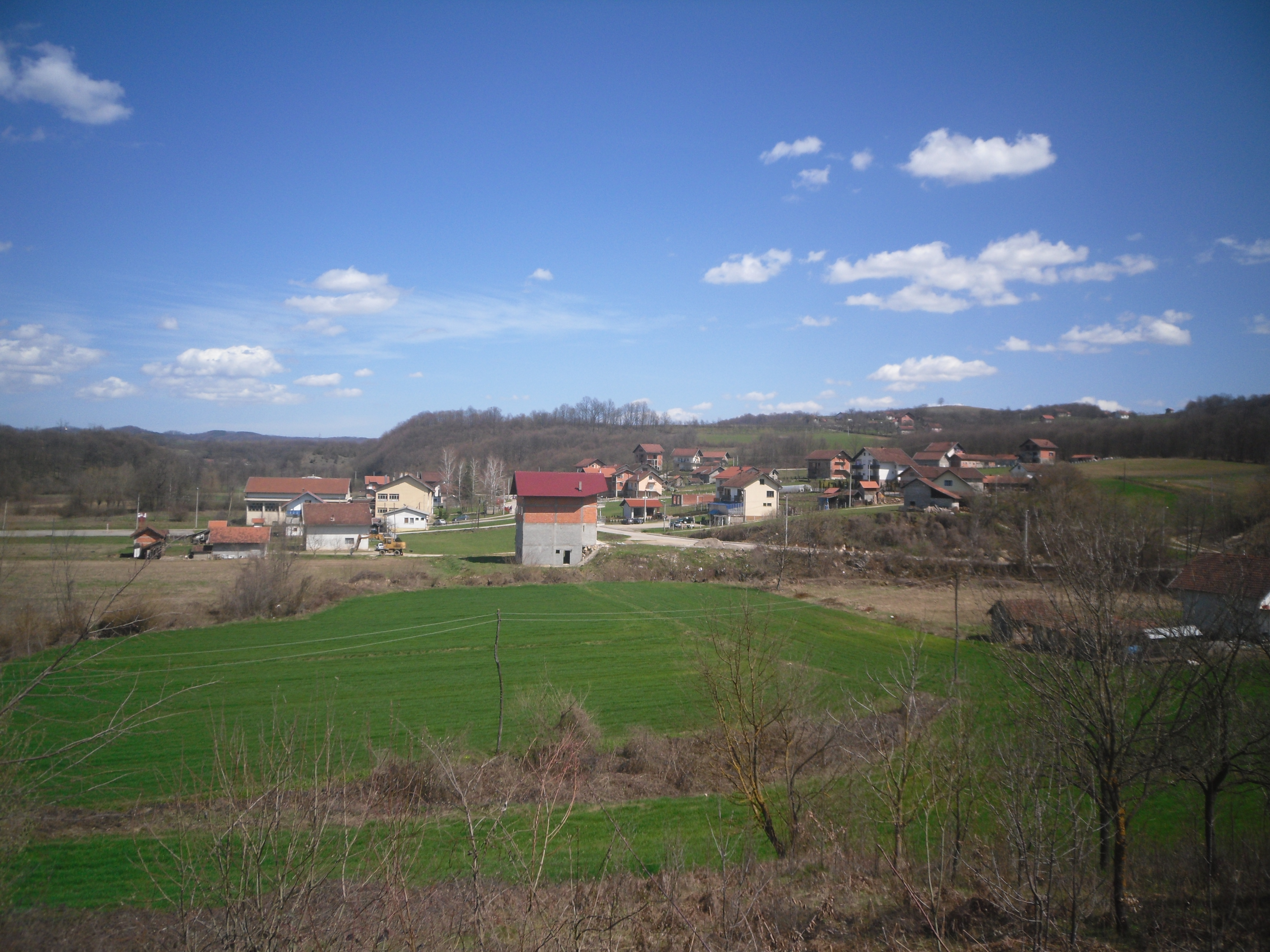

- Location within Bosnia and Herzegovina
- Coordinates: 44°46′42″N 17°01′23″E
- Country: Bosnia and Herzegovina
- Entity: Republika Srpska
- Municipality: Banja Luka

Population (2013)
  - Total: 594
- Time zone: UTC+1 (CET)
  - Summer (DST): UTC+2 (CEST)

Borkovići (Serbian Cyrillic: Борковићи) is a village in the municipality of Banja Luka, Republika Srpska, Bosnia and Herzegovina.

== Demographics ==
Ethnic groups in the village include:

- 587 Serbs (98.82%)
- 7 Others (1.18%)
