= Irreligion in Bosnia and Herzegovina =

According to the 2013 population census in Bosnia and Herzegovina, 71,369 people or 2.02% of the population declared as atheists or agnostics or haven't disclosed their religion. Of them, there were 27,853 atheists or 0.79% of the total population and 10,816 agnostics or 0.31% of the total population. Those who have not disclosed their religion numbered 32,700 people or 0.93% of the total population.

== Ethnicity ==
According to the 2013 census, the majority of the irreligious people in Bosnia and Herzegovina belonged to the non-constituent nations, legally defined as the "others", who make up 59.54% of the total irreligious population. They were followed by Bosniaks, who make up 19.44% of the irreligious population, and then Serbs who make up 11.31% and Croats 9.70% of the total irreligious population respectively.

Irreligion by ethnicity
Ethnicity
Bosniaks	13,877
Serbs	8,070
Croats	6,926
others	42,496
