= Barlovci =

Barlovci Барловци (Serbian)
- Village (Selo)
- Location within Bosnia and Herzegovina
- Coordinates: 44°52′01″N 17°11′58″E
- Country: Bosnia and Herzegovina
- Entity: Republika Srpska
- Municipality: Banja Luka

Population (2013)
  - Total: 711
- Time zone: UTC+1 (CET)
  - Summer (DST): UTC+2 (CEST)

Barlovci (Serbian Cyrillic: Барловци) is a village in the municipality of Banja Luka, Republika Srpska, Bosnia and Herzegovina.

== Demographics ==
Ethnic groups in the village include:

- 677 Serbs (95.22%)
- 20 Croats (2.81%)
- 14 Others (1.97%)
