= Verići =

Verići Верићи (Serbian)
- Village (Selo)
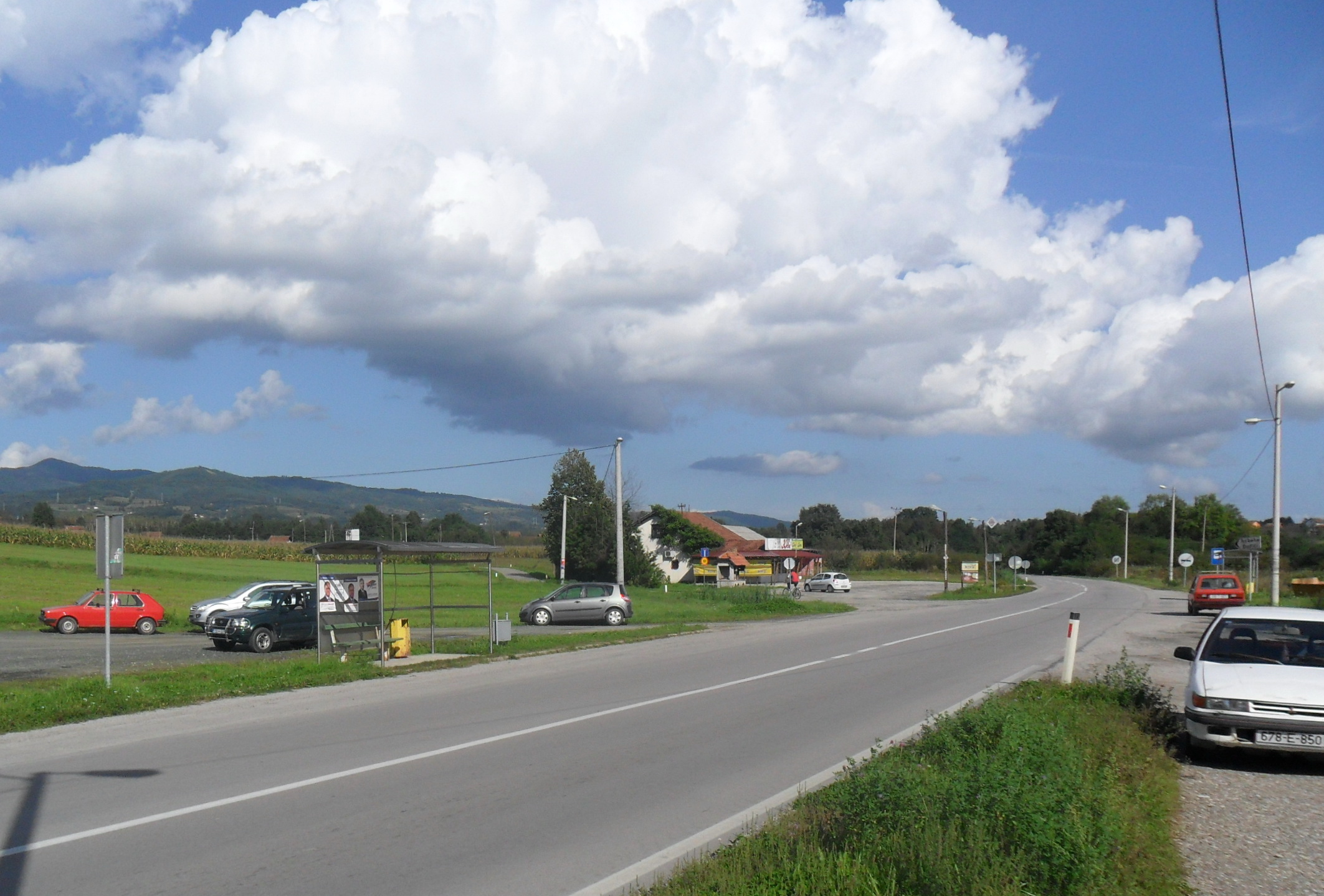

- Location within Bosnia and Herzegovina
- Coordinates: 44°55′25″N 17°03′40″E
- Country: Bosnia and Herzegovina
- Entity: Republika Srpska
- Municipality: Banja Luka

Population (2013)
  - Total: 1,123
- Time zone: UTC+1 (CET)
  - Summer (DST): UTC+2 (CEST)

Verići (Serbian Cyrillic: Верићи) is a village in the municipality of Banja Luka, Republika Srpska, Bosnia and Herzegovina.
