= Prijakovci =

Prijakovci Пријаковци (Serbian)
- Village (Selo)
- Location within Bosnia and Herzegovina
- Coordinates: 44°52′55″N 17°09′00″E
- Country: Bosnia and Herzegovina
- Entity: Republika Srpska
- Municipality: Banja Luka

Population (2013)
  - Total: 883
- Time zone: UTC+1 (CET)
  - Summer (DST): UTC+2 (CEST)

Prijakovci (Serbian Cyrillic: Пријаковци) is a village in the municipality of Banja Luka, Republika Srpska, Bosnia and Herzegovina.
