= Ramići, Banja Luka =

Ramići Рамићи (Serbian)
- Village (Selo)
- Location within Bosnia and Herzegovina
- Coordinates: 44°51′59″N 17°10′15″E
- Country: Bosnia and Herzegovina
- Entity: Republika Srpska
- Municipality: Banja Luka

Population (2013)
  - Total: 1,789
- Time zone: UTC+1 (CET)
  - Summer (DST): UTC+2 (CEST)

Ramići (Serbian Cyrillic: Рамићи) is a village in the municipality of Banja Luka, Republika Srpska, Bosnia and Herzegovina.

== See also ==
- Oksigen FM
