= Cerici =

Cerici Церици (Serbian)
- Village (Selo)
- Location within Bosnia and Herzegovina
- Coordinates: 44°53′36″N 17°08′41″E
- Country: Bosnia and Herzegovina
- Entity: Republika Srpska
- Municipality: Banja Luka

Population (2013)
  - Total: 16
- Time zone: UTC+1 (CET)
  - Summer (DST): UTC+2 (CEST)

Cerici (Serbian Cyrillic: Церици) is a village in the municipality of Banja Luka, Republika Srpska, Bosnia and Herzegovina.

== Demographics ==
Ethnic groups in the village include:

- 13 Serbs (81.25%)
- 3 Croats (18.75%)
