= Oksigen FM =

Radio station in Bosnia and Herzegovina

Frequencies
MHz	City
104.9	Kozara
89.6	Banja Luka
105.4	Travnik
99.8	Bugojno
96.4	Ivovik

Oksigen (English: Oxygen) was a youth-orientated radio station operated by NATO from studios located in the Ramići Metal Factory in Banja Luka, Bosnia and Herzegovina, from 1999 to 2005. Set up after the Yugoslav Wars the late 1990s, the objective of Oksigen was to unite Serbians, Croats, and Bosnians in a tolerant multicultural state by positively influencing young people.
