= Statistical system of Bosnia and Herzegovina =

Group of government processes and organisations

Bosnia and Herzegovina has three governmental statistics offices, each one responsible for a different area of the government. One agency is in charge of whole country statistics (the BHAS), while the other two oversee statistics in BiH's constituent entities, the Republika Srpska and The Federation of Bosnia and Herzegovina. This system reflects strong decentralization in the region, and several independent reports have stated that this impedes an efficiently functioning government body. To this end, the three agencies still do not fully agree on several various statistical concepts and definitions. All three agencies were established in 2004 with the passage of the Law on Statistics of Bosnia and Herzegovina. Also, the Central Bank, though not a statistics agency on its own, is tasked with calculating yearly balances and preparing other financial statistics.

A chart of the organisation of BiH's statistical system.

== Legal framework ==
The Law on Statistics of Bosnia and Herzegovina, ordered by the High Representative in 2002 and passed in 2004, is the foundation of BiH's statistics system. It defines the legislative framework under which the statistical system should function—how information is to be disseminated, organized, and produced. This national law, and related laws passed in the Federation of Bosnia and Herzegovina and in Republika Srpska, established the BHAS, FIS, and RSIS, respectively. The laws creating the FIS and RSIS have been constructed such that the two agencies are essentially accountable to the BHAS, and that the BHAS decides which data to collect for national statistics.

=== Professional Independence ===
The national law does not say much about professional independence, though it does mention that the BHAS staff should not seek help from the government and should maintain "technical autonomy." The laws governing the FIS and RSIS, though, are much more direct. Article 2 of the Law on Statistics of the Federation of BiH states that "All statistical activities shall be implemented following the principle of neutrality, objectivity and professional independency" and Article 8 states that "When implementing the Program the Director and staff of the Federal Institute shall not request or receive instructions from the authorities in the Federation, other state bodies, political parties or other groups of interest...", while Paragraph 2 of Article 17 of the Law on Statistics of Republika Srpska states: "The principles of impartiality, reliability, transparency and statistical confidentiality will be applied in organizing and production of statistics..." and Paragraph 6 states: "The Institute and the authorized bodies and organizations are independent in the production of the statistics from its scope of the activities".

=== Privacy ===
BiH privacy laws mean that any data collected from individuals remains anonymous.

== Agencies ==
=== The Agency for Statistics of Bosnia and Herzegovina (BHAS) ===
The Agency of Statistics of Bosnia and Herzegovina is the state-level statistics office. It oversees the two other offices, one for Republika Srpska and the other for Federation of Bosnia and Herzegovina and then disseminates the data to international bodies. The Statistical office of the Brcko district was incorporated into the BHAS in 2006. It tracks and aggregates data on:

- Education
- The Consumer Price Index
- Employment/Wages
- Tourism
- Foreign Trade
- Agriculture
- Forestry
- Construction
- Demography, etc.

In a bid to improve data governance in BiH and to bring it up to European norms, the BHAS has been closely working with non-governmental and inter-governmental organizations such as Eurostat and UNESCO.

The BHAS is a politically independent organization, accountable to the Bosnia and Herzegovina Council of Ministers. According to its rulebook, adopted in 2005, the agency employs a minimum of 74 workers, 66 of which are based in the agency's main office in Sarajevo, and eight of which should work in the branch office in Brcko. Its current organizational structure was adopted in 2007, delegating a Director, two deputy directors, and several sectors and departments.

In 2010, its budget was 2.73 million Euros.

The BHAS has overseen the only census conducted in modern BiH.

=== The Federal Office of Statistics (FIS) ===
The Federal Office of Statistics is the primary statistics office of the Federation of Bosnia and Herzegovina. It collects data on general national statistics of the Federation. The FIS is responsible for 10 of the 17 regional statistics units of BiH, and employs approximately 180 people. The ten regional units are tasked specifically with data collection. It is based in Sarajevo. Since 2007, its sole publication is the annual Statistical Yearbook of the Federation of Bosnia and Herzegovina. The leadership of the organization consists of a Director and a Secretary. The FIS primarily collects data on business, economy, and demography, with those three being its only separate departments devoted to a specific statistic.

In 2010, its budget was 9.5 million KM.

=== Republika Srpska Institute of Statistics (RSIS) ===
Located in Banja Luka, the RSIS is the governmental body tasked with handling statistics in the Republika Srpska and is responsible for six of the 17 regional statistics units of BiH, and employs around 100 people. It generally publishes ~300 paper publications annually, the most all-encompassing of which is the Statistical Yearbook, which contains all of the data the RSIS has aggregated throughout the year. Since 2008, it has also produced a publication titled "This is Republika Srpska", intended to be a more easily digestible, more accessible format for annual national statistics. The RSIS also produces many online publications. Since 2007, all publications of the Institute are bilingual.

The Leadership of the RSIS consists of a Director and a deputy director, both of which are assisted by and advised by the RS Statistical Council and an independent Board of Professionals.

In 2010 its budget was 3.999 million KM.

=== The Central Bank ===
The Central Bank is charged with gathering statistics on finances and balances. This includes macroeconomic data, foreign trade data, foreign debt data, and data on government expenditure and budgeting.

== Actions ==
The organizations are tasked with working together to do several statistics-related activities, such as the census and the Statistical Yearbooks.

=== Census ===
There has been one census in BiH since 1991, when the last Yugoslav Census took place. The census process was drawn out and political, as the Bosniaks, Serbs, and Croats sought to increase their share of the population. This has been a large aspect holding BiH from European Union membership. Furthermore, there have been very few steps taken toward taking the next census.

=== Agricultural Census ===
In 2022, the BHAS proposed an agricultural census. The idea was accepted by the government, and an agricultural census will be taking place from 2023 to 2026. This will be the first agricultural census in the region since 1960.

== Relation to international statistics organizations ==
Much of the work Bosnia and Herzegovina has put into its statistics system is aimed at bringing it in line with European standards. BiH has been making incremental steps to align its statistics system to the EU. An AGA conducted in 2011 stated that the system "could benefit from the usage of administrative sources, the establishment, development and management of statistical registers at the state level; access to microdata for research purposes, etc.". Some of these proposed amendments are adopted de jure, but in practice none of the suggestions are implemented to their full potential.

The EU continues to provide large amounts of funding and support to the BHAS and its affiliates in the form of IPA funding. The EU has also been conducting various projects and programmes aimed at evaluating potential areas of growth for BiH's statistical system.
