= 2013 population census in Bosnia and Herzegovina =

First census in Bosnia after the civil war

2013 Census in Bosnia and Herzegovina
- 1–15 October 2013

General information
- Country: Bosnia and Herzegovina

Results
- Total population: 3,531,159 (final)

Population of Bosnia and Herzegovina in 2013 by nationality
1. Bosniaks (50.1%)
2. Serbs (30.8%)
3. Croats (15.4%)
4. Others (2.73%)
5. Not declared/no answer (0.88%)

The most recent census of Bosnia and Herzegovina, the 2013 census (Popis stanovništva, domaćinstava i stanova u Bosni i Hercegovini, 2013. / Попис становништва, домаћинстава и станова у Босни и Херцеговини, 2013.), took place from 1 October until 15 October 2013 with a reference date of census 30 September 2013 at 24:00 hours (midnight), 22 years after the previous census. It was the first census after the Bosnian War. It was organized by the Central Census Bureau of Bosnia and Herzegovina and supported by the European Union.

Preliminary results of the census were published on 5 November 2013, revealing that 3,791,622 people were enumerated. The final results, including ethnicity data, were planned to be published in the second half of 2014, when data processing would be completed. As of June 2015, the final results had still not been released, due to a dispute between the Federation of Bosnia and Herzegovina and Republika Srpska statistical agencies.

The Steering Committee of the International Monitoring Operation on the Population and Housing Censuses in Bosnia and Herzegovina, the international observers by the census process, reported in March 2016 that a new director was appointed to the national statistical agency in December 2015, who could decide on the blocking issues, and that the result of the 2013 census had to be published by July 2016. On 30 June 2016, the official results were published. The census results are contested by the Republika Srpska statistical office and by Bosnian Serb politicians, who oppose the inclusion of non-permanent Bosnian residents in the figures. The population according to the final results is lower than in the preliminary results published in 2013. The European Union's statistics office, Eurostat, concluded in May 2016 that the methodology used by the Bosnian statistical agency is in line with international recommendations.

== Results ==
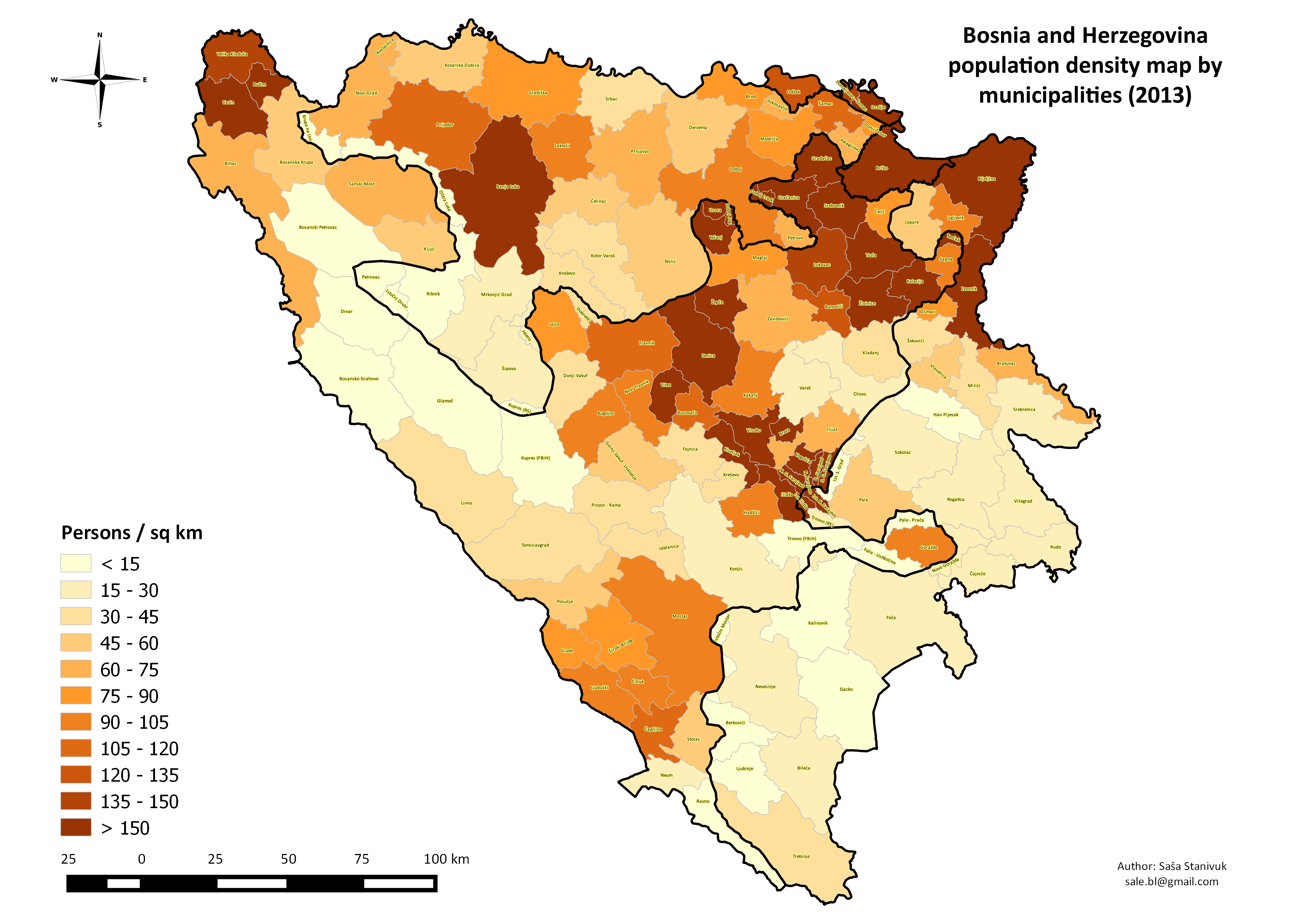
Population density in Bosnia and Herzegovina by municipality, early data from the 2013 census

=== Preliminary results ===
	Total enumerated persons	Percentage of total population
Bosnia and Herzegovina	3,791,622	100.00%
Federation of Bosnia and Herzegovina	2,371,603	62.55%
Republika Srpska	1,326,991	35.00%
Brčko District	93,028	2.45%

=== Final results ===
	Total population	Percentage of total population
Bosnia and Herzegovina	3,531,159	100.00%
Federation of Bosnia and Herzegovina	2,219,220	62.85%
Republika Srpska	1,228,423	34.79%
Brčko District	83,516	2.37%

== Ethnic groups ==
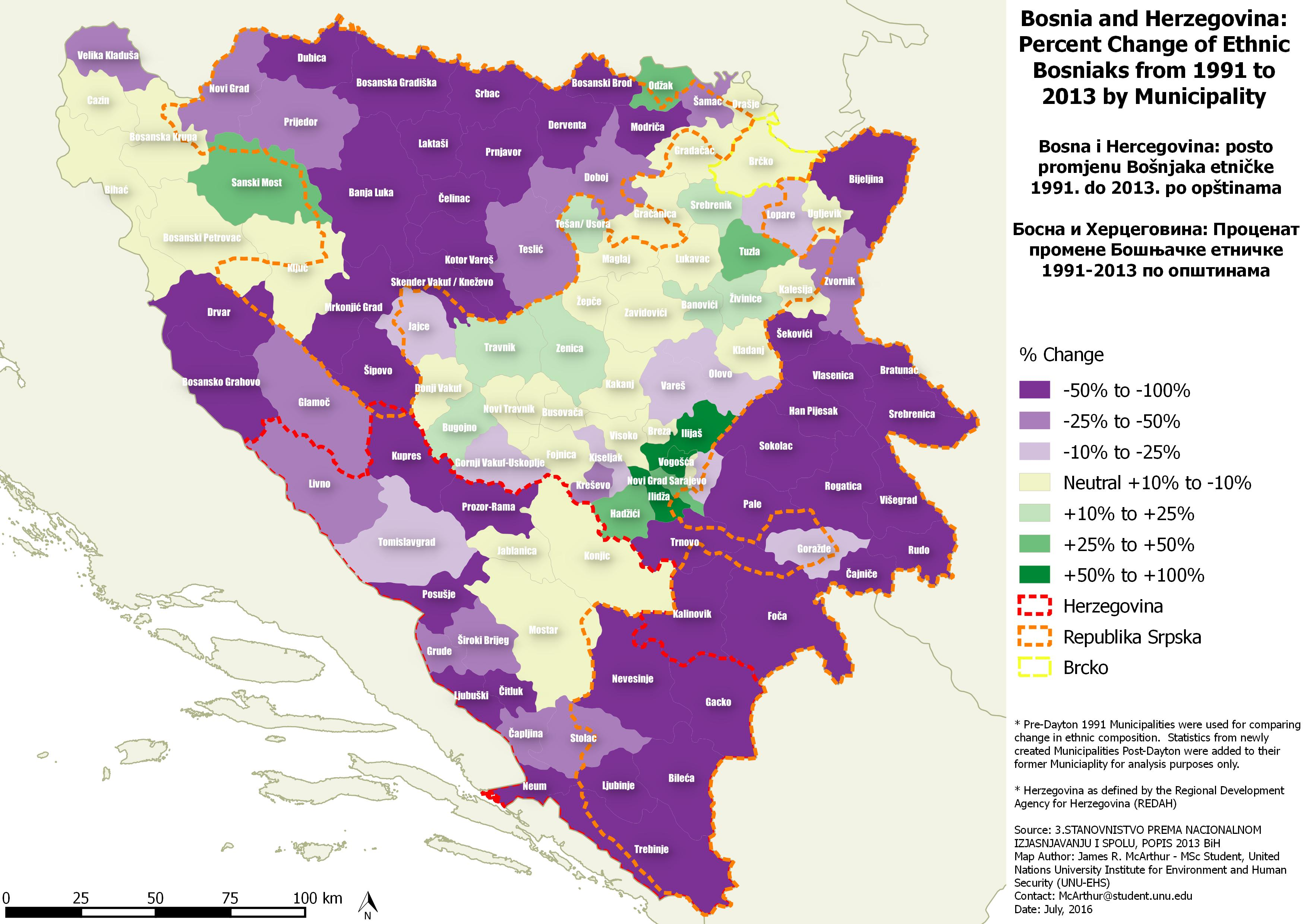
% change of the number of ethnic Bosniaks by Municipality from 1991 to 2013

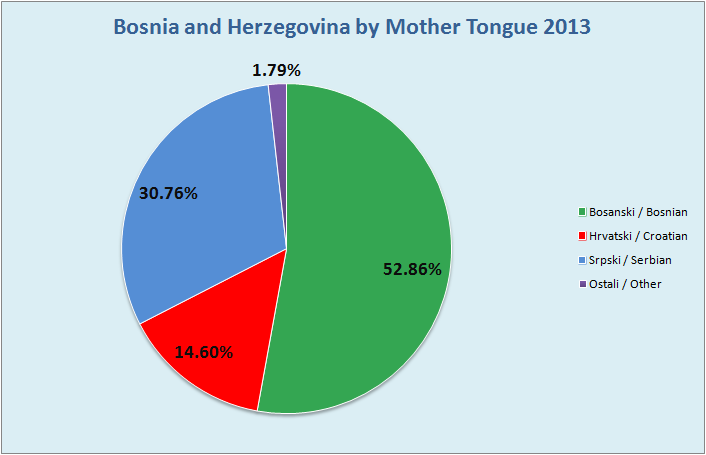
Bosnia and Herzegovina by Mother Tongue 2013

The final results published on 30 June 2016 included statistics on ethnic groups in Bosnia and Herzegovina.

	Population	%
Bosniaks	1,769,592	50.12%
Serbs	1,086,733	30.83%
Croats	544,780	15.43%
Others	96,539	2.73%
Not declared	27,055	0.71%
No answer	6,460	0.18%

FBiH
Bosniaks	70.4%
Croats	22.4%
Serbs	2.55%

RS
Serbs	81.51%
Bosniaks	13.99%
Croats	2.41%

	1991		2013		1991-2013 change	
	Population	% of total	Population	% of total	Population	% of total
Bosniaks	1,902,956	43.47%	1,769,592	50.11%	-133,364	+6.64%
Serbs	1,366,104	31.21%	1,086,733	30.78%	-279,371	-0.43%
Croats	760,852	17.38%	544,780	15.43%	-216,072	-1.95%
Others	296,012	6.79%	96,539	2.73%	-199,473	-4.06%
Not declared			27,055	0.71%		
No answer			6,460	0.18%		

== Religion ==
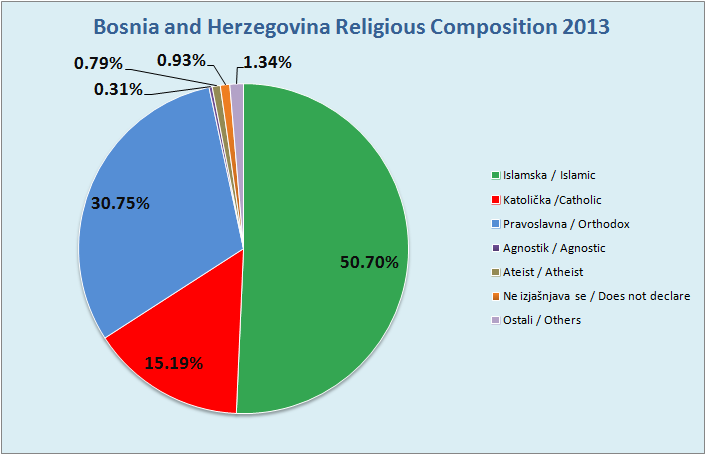
Religious Composition of Bosnia and Herzegovina: 2013 Census

	Population	%
Islam	1,790,454	50.70%
Orthodox	1,085,760	30.75%
Catholic	536,333	15.19%
Atheist	27,853	0.79%
Agnostic	10,816	0.31%
Other	40,655	1.15%
Not declared	32,700	0.93%
No answer	6,588	0.19%

== Census ==
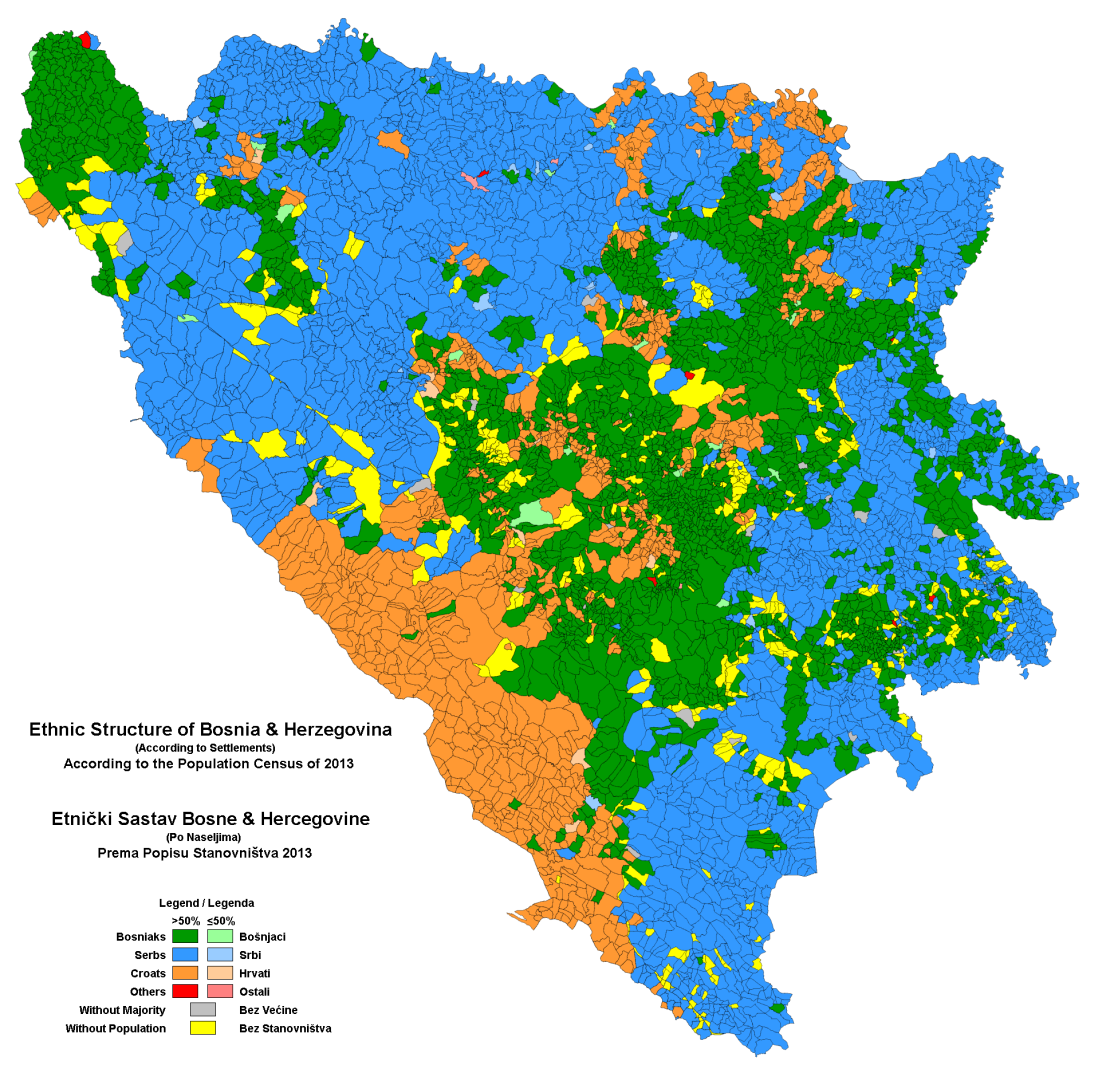
Bosnia and Herzegovina ethnic composition per settlements: 2013 Census

Census covered the following topics:

- Usual place of residence
- Name
- Name of father or mother's surname
- Sex
- Date of birth and identification number
- Place of birth
- Presence
- Length and purpose of presence / absence in the list
- Place of residence immediately after birth
- Place of residence of the person at the time of the 1991 census
- If the person was a refugee from Bosnia and Herzegovina
- If the person was displaced person in Bosnia and Herzegovina
- If the person has formally legal status of displaced persons and intends to return to place from which the displaced
- A place in Bosnia and Herzegovina which the person moved and the year of immigration
- Whether the person ever lived outside of Bosnia and Herzegovina years or more
- Month and year immigration and the state from which a person moved
- Reasons for immigration to Bosnia and Herzegovina
- Legal marital status
- Common-law communities
- Number of live births and the month and year of their birth
- Nationality
- Ethnic/national origin
- Mother tongue
- Religion
- Literacy
- Highest completed school
- Education
- Schools attended by the person
- Current status activities
- Status in employment
- Branch of economic activity companies (at work)
- Occupation
- Main source of means of livelihood
- Whether the person is dependent
- Activity of the breadwinner
- Place of work or school attendance and frequency of return in place of permanent residence
- Functional ability of a person to perform daily activities and cause of disability
- Length of stay in the country and abroad for temporary civilian stay and work in another country and place of residence in Bosnia and Herzegovina for them and their family members

== See also ==
- Demographics of Bosnia and Herzegovina
