= Roads in Bosnia and Herzegovina =

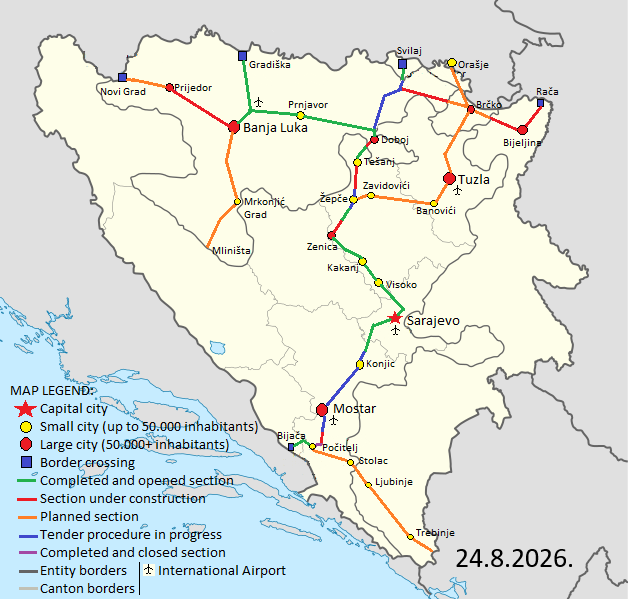
Map of motorways in Bosnia and Herzegovina

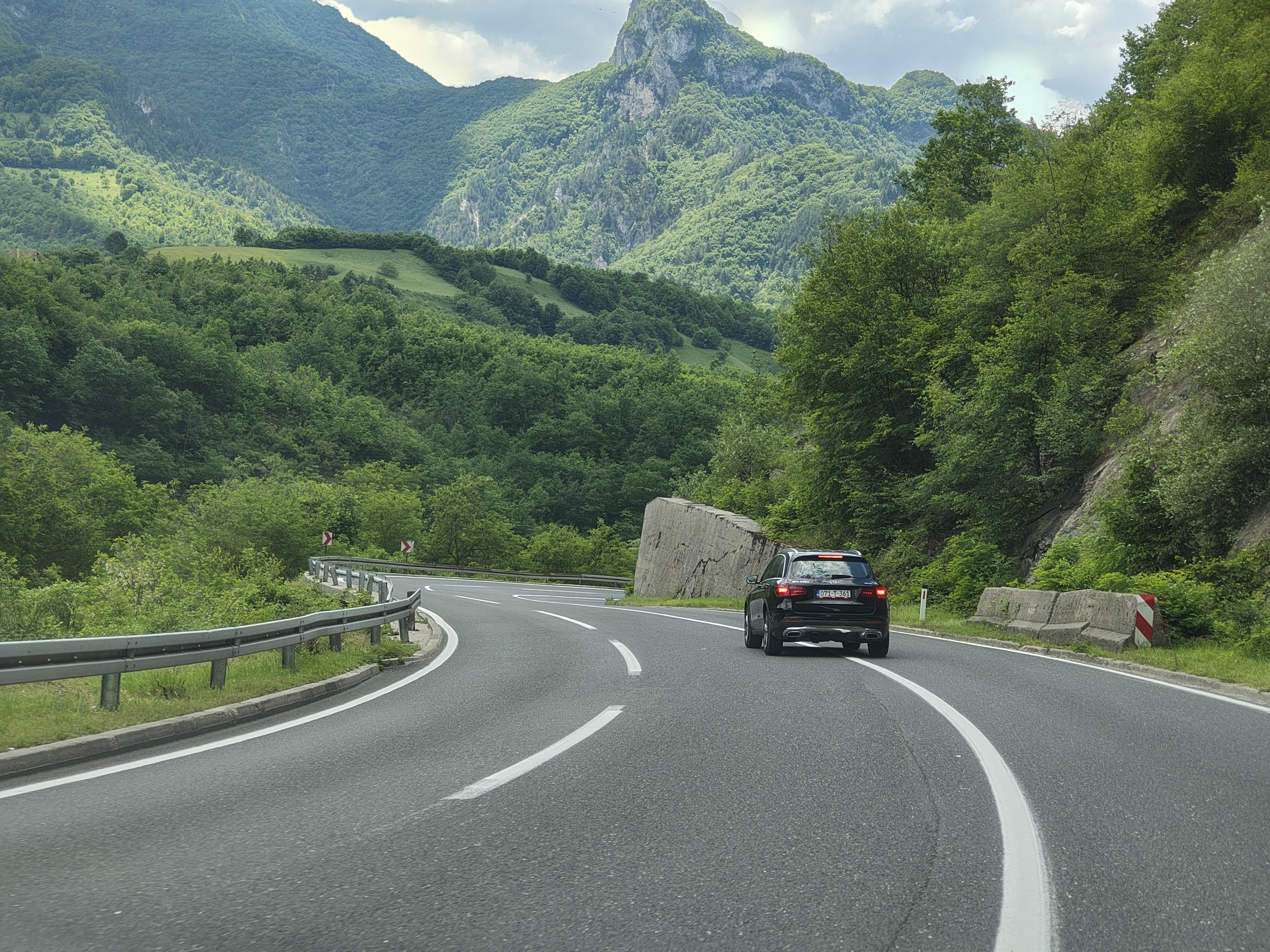
One of many mountainous roads in Bosnia and Herzegovina

Roads in Bosnia and Herzegovina are the most important traffic branch in Bosnia and Herzegovina and an important part of the European road network. Roads are built, maintained and supervised by companies run by the Federation of Bosnia and Herzegovina and the Republika Srpska. The total length of roads in the country as of 2026 is 8,883.2 km (5,519.8 mi), and they are categorized as motorways (total length of 273.2 km (169.8 mi)), main (total length of 4,274 km (2,656 mi)) and regional (total length of 4,345 km (2,700 mi)).

== Road Classification ==
There are currently two road numbering systems within Bosnia and Herzegovina. Bosnia and Herzegovina is made up of two constituent entities as well as Brčko District (designated as a condominium district between the two entities). The numbering system for highways within Federation of Bosnia and Herzegovina and Brčko District is the inherited system from Yugoslavia. The system hasn't been static however; when needed there's been changes, assigment of new main roads and regional roads by cabinet decree.

Prior to November 2019, the numbering system for highways within Republika Srpska was also the same inherited Yugoslav system. Republika Srpska has since abolished the Yugoslav system and implemented its own numbering system. There was an approved proposal in 2014 and 2018 for an update of road numbers within Federation of Bosnia and Herzegovina; however this proposal was scrapped. Thus, unlike Republika Srpska and many other ex-Yugoslav republics, Federation of Bosnia and Herzegovina and Brčko District haven't updated their numbering system.

The highways within Federation of Bosnia and Herzegovina and Brčko District are divided into the following 3 groups:

- A – "Motorways" (Autoput/Autocesta), classified and designed according to international motorway standards, single-digit codes;
- M – "Main Roads" (Magistralna cesta), one or two digit series code M-# (with branch roads designated with an attached number, M-#.#);
- R – "Regional Roads" (Regionalna cesta), 3-digit series codes R-### (with branch roads designated with a letter);

The highways in Republika Srpska are divided into the 5 following groups, based on the level of their significance whose names differ by a code letter and a roman numeral.

- A – "Motorways" (Aуто-пут), classified and designed according to international motorway standards, single-digit codes;
- M-I – "First-class Main Roads" (Магистрални пут првог реда), 3-digit 100 series codes;
- M-II – "Second-class Main Roads" (Магистрални пут другог реда), highways of international significance, 3-digit 500 series codes;
- R-I – "First-Class Regional Roads" (Регионални пут првог реда), 4-digit #100 series codes ();
- R-II – "Second-Class Regional Roads" (Регионални пут другог реда), 4-digit #500 series codes ().

== Motorways ==
The primary high-speed motorways are called autoceste or autoputevi/аутопутеви, public road specially built and intended exclusively for motor vehicle traffic, which is marked as a motorway with a prescribed traffic sign, has two physically separated lanes for traffic from opposite directions with at least two lanes and a lane for forced stopping of vehicles, without intersection with transverse roads and railways or tramways at the same level and in whose traffic it can be included or excluded only by a certain and specially built connecting public road to the appropriate lane of the motorway. They are marked with a special road sign, similar to the road sign depicting a motorway/autoroute/autobahn in other parts of Europe. Motorways in Bosnia and Herzegovina are defined by the Ministry of Traffic and Communications of Federation of Bosnia and Herzegovina and Ministry of Transport and Communications of Republika Srpska.

The Bosnian-Herzegovinian motorway network is 266.1 km (165.3 mi) long as of 2026.

=== Itinerary ===
Below table includes the designated motorways within Federation of Bosnia and Herzegovina and Brčko District.

Road	Direction	Length			E-Road Designation
Road	Direction	Total	Operational	Under Construction	E-Road Designation
A-1 A1	Donji Svilaj (border with Croatia: A5) - Odžak (border with RS: A-3) a break in the itinerary of this route Makljenovac (border with RS: A-3) - Žepče - Zenica - Sarajevo - Jablanica - Počitelj - Zvirovići - Bijača (border with Croatia: A10)	274.0	153.9	29.9	E73; E761
A-2 A2	Orašje (border with Croatia: D55) - Border of FBiH & Brčko dist. - Brčko - Border of FBiH & Brčko dist. - Srebrenik - Tuzla	61.0	-	-	
A-3 A3	Žepče - Zavidovići - Lukavac - Banovići - Živinice - Tuzla	55.4	-	-	
A-4 A4	Počitelj - Čapljina - Stolac (border with RS: M-I-118)	23.3	-	-	

Below table includes the designated motorways within Republika Srpska.

Road	Direction	Length			E-Road Designation
Road	Direction	Total	Operational	Under Construction	E-Road Designation
A-1	Gradiška (border with Croatia: D5) – Banja Luka – Mrkonjić Grad – Mlinište (border with FBiH: M-15)	131.3	34.0		E661
A-2	Novi Grad (border with Croatia: D6) – Prijedor – Banja Luka – Doboj	242.0	72.2	110.5	
A-2	Vukosavlje - border with Brčko District a break in the itinerary of this route border with Brčko District - Bijeljina - Sremska Rača (border with Serbia: A7)	242.0	72.2	110.5	
A-3	Makljenovac (border with FBiH: A-1) – Doboj – Vukosavlje (border with FBiH: A-1)	46.6	5.65	5.6	E73

=== Description and status ===
==== Operational ====
Motorway	Route	Length (in 2026)	Description	Notes
A-1; A1 (FBiH)	Croatian border - Odžak - Doboj - Zenica - Sarajevo - Mostar - Croatian border	160.2 km (99.5 mi)	The motorway starts on border of Croatia near Svilaj and runs south to Odžak where it ends right next to the entity border. The only part of the highway that passes through Republika Srpska starts at the Johovac junction, with a crossing towards the Banja Luka - Doboj Highway, and ends at the Rudanka junction. The motorway continues near Žepče and passes east of Zenica and west of Sarajevo, with which the bypass is directly connected. The end of the middle part is in Bradina. South part starts at Počitelj and ends on border with Croatia near Bijača. The motorway follows the Vc corridor along the entire route.	Several sections are under constructions or planned to connect four separate parts.
A-1; A1 (RS)	Croatian border - Banja Luka - Mrkonjić Grad - IEBL	33.7 km (20.9 mi)	The motorway starts on border of Croatia near Gradiška and follows a route of E661. The highway passes through the Laktaši interchange with the highway towards Doboj, after which it ends north of Banja Luka.	Section south of Banja Luka is planned
A-2; A2 (RS)	Croatian border - Prijedor - Banja Luka - Doboj / Vukosavlje - Brčko District - Bijeljina - Serbian border	72.2 km (44.9 mi)	The motorway starts at Laktaši interchange after which goes beside Prnjavor and ends in Johovac junction connecting.	Several sections are planned or being constructed
A-3; A3 (RS)	IEBL - Doboj - IEBL	5.6 km (3.5 mi)	The motorway starts at Johovac junction and ends on IBEL connecting to A1 (FBiH).	Section toward north is planned.

==== constructed but not yet operational ====
Motorway	Entity	Length	Section	Note
A-1; A1 (FBiH)	FBiH	7.2 km (4.5 mi)	Buna - Počitelj	The section is completed but it will be open with section Kvanj tunnel - Buna.

==== under construction ====
Motorway	Entity	Length	Section	Description	Scheduled completion
A-1; A1 (FBiH)	FBiH	21.3 km (13.2 mi)	Medakovo - Ozimica	One interchange, two double-sided rest stops, eight bridges and viaducts, two overpasses, fifteen underpasses and the 2.200-kilometer long Crni vrh tunnel.	End of Q3 2026
A-1; A1 (FBiH)	FBiH	5.2 km (3.2 mi)	Kvanj tunnel - Buna	The 2.700-kilometer Kvanj tunnel and a Rotimski potok viaduct.	May 2027
A-2; A2 (RS)	RS	5.3 km (3.3 mi)	Rudanka - Putnikovo brdo 2	Two tunnels and one bridge.	End of 2025
A-2; A2 (RS)	RS	18.7 km (11.6 mi)	Banja Luka - Prijedor	23 overpasses, ten underpasses, nine bridges.	End 2028
A-2; A2 (RS)	RS	20.0 km (12.4 mi)	Bijeljina - Rača	One interchange, one rest aream five overpasses and for bridges.	Q2 or Q3 of 2027
A-2; A2 (RS)	RS; Brčko	17.0 km (10.6 mi)	Brčko - Bijeljina	Two interchanges	June 2029
A-2; A2 (RS)	RS; Brčko	33.0 km (20.5 mi)	Vukosavlje - Brčko	Three interchanges, a bridge and eight overpasses.	August 2025

==== Planned motorway sections ====
Motorway	Entity	Length	Section	Notes
A-1; A1 (FBiH)	FBiH	12.8 km (8.0 mi)	Ozimica - Poprikuše	Tender procedure in progress
A-1; A1 (FBiH)	FBiH	10.7 km (6.6 mi)	Ivan - Ovčari	Preparatory activities for construction in progress
A-1; A1 (FBiH)	FBiH	10.1 km (6.3 mi)	Ovčari - Konjic - Prenj tunnel	Preparatory activities for construction in progress
A-1; A1 (FBiH)	FBiH	12.4 km (7.7 mi)	Prenj tunnel	Tender procedure in progress; Construction start in mid-2023
A-1; A1 (FBiH)	FBiH	12.4 km (7.7 mi)	Prenj - Mostar north	Preparatory activities for construction in progress
A-1; A1 (FBiH)	FBiH	14.2 km (8.8 mi)	Mostar north - Mostar south	Tender procedure in progress; Construction start in mid-2023
A-1; A1 (FBiH)	FBiH	9.2 km (5.7 mi)	Mostar south - Kvanj tunnel	Tender procedure in progress; Construction start in the first half of 2024
A-2; A2 (FBiH)	FBiH	30.3 km (18.8 mi)	Orašje - Brčko - Maoča	Tender announced for the development of a conceptual design and main project
A-2; A2 (FBiH)	FBiH	23.3 km (14.5 mi)	Maoča - Tuzla	The conceptual project is being developed
A-3; A3 (FBiH)	FBiH	55.4 km (34.4 mi)	Tuzla - Žepče	Concept project completed
A-4; A4 (FBiH)	FBiH	23.3 km (14.5 mi)	Počitelj - Stolac	Project in public exhibition
A-1; A1 (RS)	RS	44.0 km (27.3 mi)	Banja Luka - Mrkonjić Grad	Tender procedure in progress
A-2; A2 (RS)	RS	23.5 km (14.6 mi)	Prijedor - Novi Grad	The preparation of the general project for the selection of the route is underway
A-3; A3 (RS)	RS	35.2 km (21.9 mi)	Johovac - Vukosavlje	Tender procedure in progress

== Expressways ==
Currently there is no expressways in use, but several are under construction and most of them are being designed.

List of planned expressways:

=== Itinerary ===
Road	Direction	Length			E-Road Designation
Road	Direction	Total	Operational	Under Construction	E-Road Designation
B-1	Izačić (border with Croatia: D217) - Bihać - Bosanski Petrovac - Ključ - Velečevo (border with RS: M-I-112) a break in the itinerary of this route Jezero (border with RS: M-I-112) - Jajce - Travnik - Vitez - Lašva	173.6	0	16.2	E761
B-1	Bihać - Cazin - Velika Kladuša (border with Croatia: D216)	45.4	0	0	
B-2	Travnik - Donji Vakuf - Bugojno - Kupres - Livno - Aržano (border with Croatia: D220)	135.0	0	0	
B-3	Donji Vinjani/Gorica (border with Croatia: D60) - Posušje - Grude - Široki Brijeg - Polog - Mostar	60.7	0	11.6	
B-4	Prača (border with RS: M-II-508) - Goražde (border with RS: M-I-109)	18.4	0	5.8	

=== Description and status ===
Entity	Route	Total length	Section	Length	Note
FBiH	Prača - Goražde	18.4 km (11.4 mi)	M5 - Hranjen tunnel	2.7 km (1.7 mi)	Main project completed
FBiH	Prača - Goražde	18.4 km (11.4 mi)	Hranjen tunnel	5.8 km (3.6 mi)	Under construction
FBiH	Prača - Goražde	18.4 km (11.4 mi)	Hranjen tunnel - Pobjeda	5.3 km (3.3 mi)	Main project completed
FBiH	Prača - Goražde	18.4 km (11.4 mi)	Pobjeda - Sopotnica	4.6 km (2.9 mi)	Main project completed
FBiH	Bihać - Cazin - Velika Kladuša - border crossing (Croatia)	45.4 km (28.2 mi)	Bihać - Ćoralići	18.0 km (11.2 mi)	The conceptual project has been completed
FBiH	Bihać - Cazin - Velika Kladuša - border crossing (Croatia)	45.4 km (28.2 mi)	Ćoralići - border crossing	27.4 km (17.0 mi)	The conceptual project is being developed
FBiH	Izačić - Bihać - Ključ	106.4 km (66.1 mi)	Izačić - Gorjevac	TBD	The conceptual project has been completed
FBiH	Izačić - Bihać - Ključ	106.4 km (66.1 mi)	Gorjevac - Bravsko	TBD	The conceptual project has been completed
FBiH	Izačić - Bihać - Ključ	106.4 km (66.1 mi)	Bravsko - Ključ	TBD	The conceptual project has been completed
FBiH	Mostar north - Široki Brijeg - border crossing (Croatia)	60.7 km (37.7 mi)	Mostar north - Vihovići	11.6 km (7.2 mi)	The conceptual project is being developed
FBiH	Mostar north - Široki Brijeg - border crossing (Croatia)	60.7 km (37.7 mi)	Vihovići - Polog	8.7 km (5.4 mi)	The conceptual project is being developed
FBiH	Mostar north - Široki Brijeg - border crossing (Croatia)	60.7 km (37.7 mi)	Polog - Polugrno	15.8 km (9.8 mi)	Main project completed and the expropriation procedure is in progress. The tender procedure for construction and supervision of project underway.
FBiH	Mostar north - Široki Brijeg - border crossing (Croatia)	60.7 km (37.7 mi)	Polugrno - Grude East	11.8 km (7.3 mi)	Under construction
FBiH	Mostar north - Široki Brijeg - border crossing (Croatia)	60.7 km (37.7 mi)	Grude East - border crossing	12.8 km (8.0 mi)	Main project completed and the expropriation procedure is in progress. The tender procedure for construction and supervision of project underway.
FBiH	Lašva - Travnik - Jajce	67.2 km (41.8 mi)	Lašva - Kaonik	5.83 km (3.62 mi)	
FBiH	Lašva - Travnik - Jajce	67.2 km (41.8 mi)	Kaonik - Selište	4.4 km (2.7 mi)	
FBiH	Lašva - Travnik - Jajce	67.2 km (41.8 mi)	Selište - interchange Vitez	3.78 km (2.35 mi)	
FBiH	Lašva - Travnik - Jajce	67.2 km (41.8 mi)	interchange Vitez - exit from business zone Vitez	5.0 km (3.1 mi)	The conceptual project is being developed
FBiH	Lašva - Travnik - Jajce	67.2 km (41.8 mi)	exit from business zone Vitez - Nević Polje	4.8 km (3.0 mi)	Constructed but not opened
FBiH	Lašva - Travnik - Jajce	67.2 km (41.8 mi)	Nević Polje - Turbe	11.4 km (7.1 mi)	Main project is finished.
FBiH	Lašva - Travnik - Jajce	67.2 km (41.8 mi)	Turbe - Jajce	30.6 km (19.0 mi)	The competition for main project is underway.
FBiH	Sarajevo bypass	1.44 km (0.89 mi)	Lot 3B	1.44 km (0.89 mi)	Construction suspended
FBiH	Turbe - Bugojno - Kupres - Livno - border crossing (Croatia)	135.0 km (83.9 mi)			
FBiH	Doboj - Šićki Brod	45.0 km (28.0 mi)			Conceptual solutions and studies have been completed. A tender for the development of conceptual designs is planned for the Q1 2026.
FBiH	Šićki Brod - Kalesija	35.0 km (21.7 mi)			Conceptual solutions and studies have been completed. A tender for the development of conceptual designs is planned for the Q1 2026.
RS	Prijedor - Kozarska Dubica	—N/a			
RS	Kotor Varoš - Čelinac - Banja Luka	—N/a			
RS	Sarajevo - Sokolac - Višegrad	—N/a			
RS	Stolac - Ljubinje - Trebinje - border crossing (Montenegro)	—N/a			
RS	Bijeljina - Zvornik - Foča - Trebinje	—N/a			

== Main Roads ==
Road	Direction	Length (km)	E-Road Designation
M-1.8	Orašje (border with Croatia: D55) - Lepnica (border with RS: M-I-107) a break in the itinerary of this route Blaževac (Border of RS & Brčko dist.: M-I-107) - Cerik - Hrgovi Donji (Border of FBiH & Brčko dist.) - Ormanica - Srebrenik - Previle - Šići	48.61	
M-1.9	Gradačac - Donji Lukavac - Ormanica - Vučkovci	19.64	
M-2	Neum (border with Croatia: D236) - Kamenice - Zaton Doli (border with Croatia: D237)	9.23	E65
M-4	Vrela (border with RS: M-I-108) - Jelah - Tešanjka - Matuzići a break in the itinerary of this route Stanić Rijeka (border with RS: M-I-110) - Klokotnica - Gračanica - Petrovo - Lukavac - Šići - Tuzla - Simin Han - Međaš - Kalesija - Caparde (border with RS: M-I-110)	101.98	
M-4.2	Miljkovići (border with Croatia: D216) - Velika Kladuša - Grahovo - Krakača - Ćoralići - Cazin - Srbljani	51.01	
M-4.3	Velika Kladuša - Vrnograč - Bužim - Bosanska Otoka	56.84	
M-5	Izačić (border with Croatia: D217) - Muslići - Bihać - Ripač - Dubovsko - Vrtoče - Bosanski Petrovac - Lanište - Velagići - Ključ - Velečevo (border with RS: M-I-112) a break in the itinerary of this route Jezero (border with RS: M-I-112) - Jajce - Donji Vakuf - Turbe - Travnik - Dolac na Lašvi - Nević Polje - Bila - Vitez - Kaonik - Busovača - Gromiljak - Kiseljak - Han Ploča - Blažuj - Ilidža - Novi Grad/Sarajevo - Centar/Sarajevo (ul. Safeta Hadžića/Put Mladih Muslimana) - Stari Grad/Sarajevo - Korija (border with RS: M-I-114) branch: Kaonik - Lašva branch: Han Ploča - Lepenica (Kiseljak) a break in the itinerary of this route Prača (border with RS: M-II-508) - Hrenovica	296.81	E661; E761
M-6	Donji Vinjani/Gorica (border with Croatia: D60) - Sovići - Grude - Klobuk - Vitina - Ljubuški - Trebižat - Čapljina - Domanovići - Borojevići - Stolac - Poplat (border with RS: M-I-118)	85.09	
M-6.1	Bosansko Grahovo - Donji Kazanci - Priluka - Livno - Prisoje - Tomislavgrad (M-15) - Posušje (M-15) - Privalj - Široki Brijeg - Knešpolje - Mostar - Kokorina (border with RS: M-I-116)	259.29	
M-11	Ripač - Lohovo (border with Croatia: D218)	8.53	E71
M-14	Bihać - Srbljani - Bosanska Krupa - Ljusina - Bosanska Otoka (border with RS: M-I-100)		
M-14.1	Brusnica Mala (border with RS: M-II-500) - Donji Svilaj - Novi Grad - Odžak - Jezero (border with RS: M-II-500) a break in the itinerary of this route Donji Skugrić (border with RS: M-II-500) - Gradačac - Turić (border with RS: M-II-500) a break in the itinerary of this route Lončari (Border of RS & Brčko dist.: M-I-104) - Brčko (Southern Bypass: Gorice - Brod - Potočari - Gredice) - Brezovo Polje (Border of RS & Brčko dist.: M-I-104)	43.08	
M-14.2	Northern Bosnia — Posavina Canton: Odžak - Donja Dubica - Prud (border with RS: R-I-3102) a break in the itinerary of this route Grebnice (border with RS: R-I-3102) - Domaljevac - Donja Mahala - Orašje	146.13	
M-14.2	Western Bosnia — Una-Sana Canton, Herzeg-Bosnia Canton: Bosanska Krupa - Gudavac - Krnjeuša - Bosanski Petrovac - Podovi - Drvar - Bosansko Grahovo - Strmica (border with Croatia: D33)	146.13	
M-15	Koprivna (border with RS: M-II-501) - Brdari - Sanski Most - Vrhpolje - Ključ a break in the itinerary of this route Mlinište (border with RS: M-II-503) - Glavica - Ćoslije - Glamoč - Priluka a break in the itinerary of this route Livno - Šujica - Mokronoge - Tomislavgrad (M-6.1) - Posušje (M-6.1) - Donji Vinjani (border with Croatia: D76)	162.62	
M-16	Ugar River (border with RS: M-I-101) - Bare - Jajce a break in the itinerary of this route Donji Vakuf - Bugojno - Poriče - Kupres - Čajuša - Šujica a break in the itinerary of this route Livno - Mali Guber - Podgradina - Kazaginac - Kamensko (border with Croatia: D220)	107.34	E661
M-16.2	Bugojno - Gornji Vakuf-Uskoplje - Prozor-Rama - Jablanica	69.63	
M-16.3	Kazaginac - Gornja Prisika (border with Croatia: D39)	2.94	
M-16.4	Bugojno - Novi Travnik - Nević Polje	37.62	
M-16.5	Kazaginac - Prisoje	13.86	
M-17	Makljenovac (border with RS: M-I-105) - Matuzići - Ozimica - Žepče - Nemila - Zenica - Janjići - Lašva - Bilješevo a break in the itinerary of this route Blažuj - Binježevo - Hadžići - Tarčin - Živašnica - Konjic - Čelebići - Ostrožac - Jablanica - Potoci - Mostar - Buna - Žitomislići - Čapljina - Dračevo - Metković (border with Croatia: D9)	263.39	E661
M-17.1	Žepče - Zavidovići - Ribnica Dio - Banovići - Živinice - Dubrave Donje - Dubrave Gornje - Međaš	87.51	
M-17.3	Buna - Borojevići a break in the itinerary of this route Stolac - Cerovica - Hutovo - Neum	66.13	
M-17.4	Mostar - Podgorje - Čitluk - Međugorje - Ljubuški - Teskera - Crveni Grm (border with Croatia: D222)	41.51	
M-17.5	Jablanica - Blidinje - Rakitno - Posušje - Grude - Višnjica - Dužice - Privalj	100.42	
M-17.6	Dračevo - Cerovica - Hutovo - Ravno - Strujići (border with RS: M-I-118)	42.79	
M-18	Potraš (border with RS: M-I-113) - Simin Han a break in the itinerary of this route Šići - Živinice - Kladanj - Čude - Olovo - Nišići - Semizovac - Vogošća - Rajlovac - Ilidža - Dobrinja (border with RS: M-I-111) a break in the itinerary of this route Bogatići (border with RS: M-I-111) - Trnovo (border with RS: M-I-111)	143.22	E762
M-18.1	Trnovo - Ustikolina	46.36	
M-19.2	Kladanj - Turalići (border with RS: M-II-506)	11.80	
M-20	Central Bosnia — Bosnian-Podrinje Canton Goražde: Kopači (border with RS: M-I-109) - Goražde - Osanica - Ustikolina (border with RS: M-I-109)	37.77	
M-20	Southeastern Bosnia — Herzegovina-Neretva Canton: Ljubovo (border with RS: M-I-109) - Ivanica (border with Croatia: D223)	37.77	

== Regional Roads ==
Road	Direction
R-400	Vrnograč - Krakača
R-400a	Velika Kladuša - Miljkovići
R-401	Velika Kladuša - Zagrad (border with Croatia: Ž3258)
R-401a	Vrnograč - border with Croatia (Ž3231)
R-401b	Bužim - Cazin
R-402	Ljusina - Stijena - Cazin
R-403	Ćoralići - Ćehići - Tržačka Raštela (border with Croatia: Ž3269)
R-403a	Tržačka Raštela - Velika Gata - Muslići a break in the itinerary of this route Bihać - Veliki Skočaj
R-403b	Grahovo - Šturlić - Ćehići
R-404	Podvidača (border with RS: R-I-1101) - Stari Majdan - Brdari
R-404a	Bosanska Krupa - Arapuša (border with RS: R-I-1102)
R-405	Gudavac - Lušci Palanka - Gornji Kamengrad - Sanski Most - Sasina (border with RS: M-II-502)
R-406	Stara Rijeka - Stari Majdan (border with RS: R-II-1502)
R-407	Lušci Palanka - Bosanski Petrovac
R-407a	Lušci Palanka - Sanica - Velagići
R-408	Dubovsko - Kulen Vakuf - Martin Brod - Drvar - Rore - Glavica
R-409	Rore - Bosansko Grahovo
R-410	Vrhpolje - Hrustovo - Jezerci - Sanica - Budelj Gornji - Lanište
R-410a	Vrhpolje - Kamičak - Velagići
R-413	Turbe - Gostilj - Vitovlje - Prisika (border with RS: M-II-505)
R-413a	Vitovlje - Šišava - Travnik a break in the itinerary of this route Dolac na Lašvi - Han Bila - Donji Čajdraš
R-413b	Gostilj - Bare
R-415	Kupres - Mrđanovci (border with RS: R-I-2109)
R-415b	Ćoslije - border with RS
R-416	Donji Kazanci - Gornji Rujani - Prolog - Mali Guber
R-416a	Prolog - Vaganj (border with Croatia: D219)
R-418	Prozor-Rama - Rumboci - Donje Ravno - Mokronoge
R-418a	Donje Ravno - Čajuša
R-418b	Prozor-Rama - Parsovići a break in the itinerary of this route Buturović Polje - Čelebići - Konjic
R-419	Široki Brijeg - Izbično - Rakitno
R-419a	Blidinje - Tomislavgrad
R-420	Osoje - Posušje - Čitluk - Vir - Zavelim - Vinica - Aržano (border with Croatia: Ž6292)
R-420a	Višnjica - Donji Mamići - Dužice
R-421	Gorica - Drinovci - Klobuk
R-421a	Sovići - Drinovci - Runović (border with Croatia: Ž6182)
R-422	Vitina - Veljaci - Orahovlje (border with Croatia: Ž6209)
R-423	Orahovlje - Teskera - Hardomilje - Bijača - Zvirići (border with Croatia: Ž6218)
R-423a	Ljubuški - Hardomilje
R-424	Knešpolje - Podgorje
R-425	Široki Brijeg - Hamzići - Međugorje a break in the itinerary of this route Čitluk - Žitomislići
R-425a	Međugorje - Žitomislići a break in the itinerary of this route Čapljina - Gabela - Gabela Polje (border with Croatia: D62)
R-425b	Ljubuški - Lipno - Hamzići
R-426	Ravno - Trebinja - Čepikuće (border with Croatia: Ž6294)
R-427	Stolac - Do (border with RS: R-I-6101)
R-428	Ravno - Zavala - Orahov Do (border with Croatia: Ž6232)
R-435	Konjic - Borci - Ćesim (border with RS: R-II-6502)
R-435a	Ćesim - Potoci
R-436	Borci - Odžaci - Argud - Hotovlje (border with RS: R-II-5504)
R-437	Fojnica - Parsovići - Buturović Polje - Ostrožac
R-438	Gromiljak - Fojnica - Sebešić
R-439	Novi Travnik - Sebešić - Gornji Vakuf-Uskoplje
R-440	Bila - Han Bila - Gluha Bukovica (border with RS: R-II-2504)
R-441	Zenica - Vitez
R-442a	Hadžići - Žunovnica - Gornja Grkarica - Krupac (border with RS: R-II-5505)
R-442b	Gornja Grkarica - Donja Grkarica - Dujmovići - Turovi (border with RS: R-II-5506)
R-442c	Babin Do - Donja Grkarica
R-442d	Žunovnica - Hrasnica
R-443	Visoko - Kiseljak - Kreševo - Tarčin
R-443a	Kreševo - Lepenica (Kiseljak)
R-444	Podkamensko - Zvijezda - Vareš - Breza - Podlugovi
R-444a	Vareš - Ratanj
R-444b	Zvijezda - Ravne - Kamenica - Nišići
R-445	Nemila - Zenica - Janjići a break in the itinerary of this route Bilješevo - Donji Kakanj - Kakanj - Čatići - Visoko - Podlugovi - Ilijaš - Semizovac
R-445a	Vogošća (ulica Igmanska) - Hotonj - Kobilja Glava - Centar/Sarajevo (ulica Alipašina/Skendarija most)
R-446	Vraca (border with RS: R-II-5515) - Miljevići (border with RS: R-II-5515) a break in the itinerary of this route Trebević (border with RS: R-II-5515) - Dovlići (border with RS: R-II-5515)
R-447	(Concurrent with R-958); Korija - Hreša (border with RS: R-II-5508)
R-447a	Hreša - Stari Grad/Sarajevo - Barice - Čavljak (ulica Sarajevskih gazija - ulica Zmajevac - ulica Sedrenik - ulica Pašino brdo)
R-448	Hrenovica - Hadžići - Jabuka (border with RS: R-II-5102) a break in the itinerary of this route Živojevići (border with RS: R-II-5102) - Goražde - Podkozara Donja (border with RS: R-II-5102)
R-448a	Prača - Orahovice - Ilovača - Osanica
R-455a	Poljice - Suha - Živinice - Ciljuge - Zelenika - Kaštijelj (border with RS: R-II-4502)
R-455b	Dubrave Donje - Morančani - Suha
R-455c	Dubrave Gornje - Ciljuge
R-456	Previle - Podorašje - Humci - Šibošnica (border with RS: R-I-4102) a break in the itinerary of this route Priboj (border with RS: R-I-4102) - Rastošnica - Goduš - Sapna (border with RS: R-I-4102)
R-456a	Kalesija - Međeđa - Sapna
R-456b	Priboj (border with RS: M-I-113 - Teočak - Stari Ugljevik (border with RS: R-II-4503)
R-457	Zenica - Arnauti - Ribnica - Donji Kakanj
R-457a	Zenica (ulica Goraždanska/Rudnički most)
R-458	Simin Han - Gornja Tuzla - Površnice/Konjikovići (border with RS: R-I-4103) a break in the itinerary of this route Čelić (border with RS: R-I-4103) - Pukiš (border with RS: R-II-4504) a break in the itinerary of this route Dubravice Gornje (Border of RS & Brčko dist.: R-II-4504) - Potočari - Brčko
R-459	Tuzla - Dokanj - Šibošnica (border with RS: R-I-4102) a break in the itinerary of this route Lukavica (border with RS: R-II-4503) - Brnjik - Ratkovići/Čelić
R-459a	Tuzla Canton; Čelić - border with RS (R-II-4503)
R-459a	Brčko District: Border of RS & Brčko dist. (R-I-4104) - Brezovo Polje
R-459b	Brnjik - Vražići - Gornji Zovik (Border of FBiH & Brčko dist.)
R-460	Gračanica - Bukva - Doborovci - Vučkovci - Hrgovi Donji - Border of FBiH & Brčko dist. - Cerik - Bukvik Gornji - Brod - Brčko (border with Croatia: D214)
R-461	Srebrenik - Bukva
R-461a	Srebrenik - Čekanići - Orahovica Donja (border with RS: R-II-3503)
R-462	Donje Ledenice (border with RS: R-I-3101) - Gradačac
R-463	Donja Mahala - Bok (border with RS: R-II-3504) a break in the itinerary of this route Gornja Tramošnica (border with RS: R-II-3504) - Gradačac
R-463a	Bok (ulica Filipovići) - Oštra Luka - Brvnik (border with RS)
R-463b	Tolisa (ulica Vladimira Nazora)
R-463c	Ugljara - Donja Mahala (ulica Josipa Bana Jelačića)
R-464a	Donji Svilaj - Potočani - Odžak
R-464b	Novi Grad - Donja Dubica
R-464c	Domaljevac - Brvnik
R-465	Rječica Donja/Parnica (border with RS: R-I-3103) - Maglaj - Zavidovići
R-465a	Zelinja Gornja/Zelinja Srednja (border with RS: R-II-3501) - Kerep - Donji Lukavac
R-465b	Klokotnica - Lukavica - Sjenina Rijeka (border with RS: R-II-3501)
R-466	Zavidovići - Ratanj - Kraljeva Sutjeska - Čatići
R-467	Ribnica Dio - Milankovići - Olovo a break in the itinerary of this route Čude - Žeravice (border with RS: R-I-5104)
R-467a	Milankovići - Kladanj
R-468	Olovo - Kolakovići (border with RS: R-II-5512)
R-470	Tuzla - Dubrave Donje
R-471	Lukavac - Babice Donje - Poljice - Stražbenica - Banovići
R-471a	Babice Donje - Orahovica - Seona - Pribitkovići - Banovići Selo - Stražbenica/Čubrić
R-473	Blatnica (border with RS: R-I-3105) - Nemila
R-474	Ozimica - Novi Šeher - Tešanj - Jelah - Lončari (border with RS: R-I-3106)
R-474a	Tešanjka - Sivša - Srednja Omanjska - Bejići - Makljenovac (border with RS: M-I-105)
R-481	Donji Vakuf - Prusac - Poriče
R-753	Živašnica - Lukomir - Šabići
R-901	Novi Grad/Novo Sarajevo/Centar/Sarajevo (ulica Safeta Zajke/ulica Drinska /ulica Hamdije Čemerlića/most Hamdije Čemerlića)
R-902	Ilidža/Novi Grad/Novo Sarajevo/Centar/Sarajevo (kružni tok Ilidža/ulica Rustem-pašina/ulica Džemala Bijedića/bulevar Meše Selimovića/ulica Zmaja od Bosne/ulica Hiseta/ulica Obala Kulina bana/ulica Maršala Tita/ulica Mula Mustafe Bešeskije/ulica Telaliulica i tunel Bentbaša)
R-903	Dobrinja/Ilidža - Lukavica (border with RS) (ulica Ante Babića/ulica Želimira Vidovića Kelija)
R-904	Novo Sarajevo/Centar/Sarajevo (most Malta/ulica Azize Šećirbegović/bulevar Ivice Osima/ulica Zagrebačka/ulica Terezija/ulica Skenderija/ulica Hamdije Kreševljakovića/Careva ćuprija)
R-905	Novo Sarajevo/Sarajevo - Vraca (border with RS) (ulica Derviša Numića)
R-951	Ilijaš - Gornja Bioča - Ahatovići - Dobroševići (ulica Dobroševićka/Rajlovačka cesta) - Rajlovac
R-952	Bojnik - Osjek - Plandište
R-953	Blažuj - Plandište - Ilidža (Butmirska cesta/Hrasnička cesta) - Hrasnica (put Famosa) - Vojkovići (border with RS)
R-954	Dobroševići - Bojnik - Stup/Ilidža (ulica Dobroševićka/ulica Bojnička/ulica Nikole Šopa/ulica Halilovići/ulica Samira Mišića) branch: Stup (ulica Hifzi Bjelevca)
R-955	Novi Grad/Sarajevo; Nedžarići - Boljakov Potok (ulica Braće Mulić/ulica Michaela Schumachera/ulica Šejha Hussein Bakry Gazzaza/ulica Ive Andrića) ("A" transversal of Sarajevo)
R-956	Novi Grad/Sarajevo (ulica Alije Kučukalića/ulice Alije Kučukalića/ulica Kraljice Jelene) (6th transversal of Sarajevo)
R-957	Centar/Sarajevo (ulica Halida Kajtaza/Ciglane Tunnel)
R-958	(Concurrent with R-447); Korija - Hreša (border with RS: R-II-5508)
R-959	Stari Grad/Sarajevo (ulica Bistrik)
R-960	Gornja Grkarica - Babin Do - Šabići - Sinanovići - Argud
R-961	Novi Grad/Novo Sarajevo/Centar/Sarajevo (ulica Džemala Bijedića/ulica Alije Kučukalića/ulica Nedima Filipovića/ulica Paromlinska/ulica Srebrenička/ulica Marka Marulića/ulica Krupska/put Života)
R-962	Reljevo - Harisa Čampare - Hotonj
R-963	Dobrinja/Ilidža (ulica Braće Mulić/bulevar Mimar Sinana/ulica Vahide Maglajlić)
R-964	Centar/Sarajevo (ulica Betanija/ulica Patriotske lige/ulica Koševo)
R-965	Novi Grad/Sarajevo (ulica Majdanska Prijedorska) (8th transversal of Sarajevo)
R-966	Novi Grad/Sarajevo (ulica Srđana Aleksića/ulica Žrtava fašizma/ulica Prijedorska) (7th transversal of Sarajevo)
R-967	Novo Sarajevo/Novi Grad/Sarajevo (ulica Paromlinska/ulica dr. Fetaha Bećirbegovića/ulice Gradačaćka/ulice Milana Preloga) (5th transversal of Sarajevo)
R-968	Novo Sarajevo/Sarajevo (ulica Krupska/ulica Ložionička/ulice Topal Osman paše) (3rd transversal of Sarajevo)
R-969	Centar/Sarajevo (ulica Fra Anđela Zvizdovića/ulica Vrbanja/most Suade i Olge) (0th transversal of Sarajevo)
R-970	Vogošća - Miševići - Gladno Polje
R-971	Novi Grad/Sarajevo (Ulica Adema Buće, btw. intersections w/ ulica Drinska and ulica Briješće Brdo)
R-972	Hadžići - Mokrine
R-973	Vogošća - Blagovac - Tihovići

== See also ==
- Roads in Republika Srpska
- List of E-roads in Bosnia and Herzegovina
