= Miljkovići =

Miljkovići may refer to these villages in Bosnia and Herzegovina:

- Miljkovići, Velika Kladuša
- Miljkovići, Mostar

== See also ==
- Miljković, singular form
