= Dubovsko =

Dubovsko Дубовско
- Village
- Location within Bosnia and Herzegovina
- Coordinates: 44°43′N 16°02′E
- Country: Bosnia and Herzegovina
- Entity: Federation of Bosnia and Herzegovina
- Canton: Una-Sana
- Municipality: Bihać

Area
  - Total: 3.93 sq mi (10.18 km^{2})

Population (2013)
  - Total: 0
  - Density: 0.0/sq mi (0.0/km^{2})
- Time zone: UTC+1 (CET)
  - Summer (DST): UTC+2 (CEST)

Dubovsko (Serbian Cyrillic: Дубовско) is a village in the municipality of Bihać, Bosnia and Herzegovina.

== Demographics ==
According to the 2013 census, its population was nil, down from 54 in 1991.
