= Bok, Orašje =

Bok
- Village
- Location within Bosnia and Herzegovina
- Coordinates: 45.0074276°N 18.611226°E
- Country: Bosnia and Herzegovina
- Entity: Federation of Bosnia and Herzegovina
- Canton: Posavina
- Municipality: Orašje

Area
  - Total: 3.30 sq mi (8.55 km^{2})

Population (2013)
  - Total: 1,392
  - Density: 422/sq mi (163/km^{2})
- Time zone: UTC+1 (CET)
  - Summer (DST): UTC+2 (CEST)

Bok is a village in the municipality of Orašje, Bosnia and Herzegovina.

== Demographics ==
According to the 2013 census, its population was 1,392.

Ethnicity in 2013
Ethnicity	Number	Percentage
Croats	1,362	97.8%
Bosniaks	12	0.9%
Serbs	10	0.7%
other/undeclared	8	0.6%
Total	1,392	100%
