= Janjići =

Janjići Јањићи
- Village
- Location within Bosnia and Herzegovina
- Coordinates: 44°9′19″N 17°57′11″E
- Country: Bosnia and Herzegovina
- Entity: Federation of Bosnia and Herzegovina
- Canton: Zenica-Doboj
- Municipality: Zenica

Area
  - Total: 0.78 sq mi (2.03 km^{2})

Population (2013)
  - Total: 961
  - Density: 1,230/sq mi (473/km^{2})
- Time zone: UTC+1 (CET)
  - Summer (DST): UTC+2 (CEST)

Janjići (Cyrillic: Јањићи) is a village in the City of Zenica, Bosnia and Herzegovina.

== Demographics ==
According to the 2013 census, its population was 961.

Ethnicity in 2013
Ethnicity	Number	Percentage
Bosniaks	940	97.8%
Croats	2	0.2%
Serbs	1	0.1%
other/undeclared	18	1.9%
Total	961	100%
