= Žunovnica =

- Village
- Nickname: žune
- Location within Bosnia and Herzegovina
- Coordinates: 43°49′N 18°12′E
- Country: Bosnia and Herzegovina
- Entity: Federation of Bosnia and Herzegovina
- Canton: Sarajevo
- Municipality: Hadžići

Area
  - Total: 1.86 sq mi (4.81 km^{2})

Population (2013)
  - Total: 437
  - Density: 235/sq mi (90.9/km^{2})
- Time zone: UTC+1 (CET)
  - Summer (DST): UTC+2 (CEST)

Žunovnica is a block in the town of Hadžići, Bosnia and Herzegovina. It consists of three streets, Igmanska, Žunovačka and Tinohovo with a population of around 2,000.

== Demographics ==
According to the 2013 census, its population was 437.

Ethnicity in 2013
Ethnicity	Number	Percentage
Bosniaks	428	97.9%
Croats	1	0.2%
Serbs	1	0.2%
other/undeclared	7	1.6%
Total	437	100%
