= Hrgovi Donji =

- Village
- Location within Bosnia and Herzegovina
- Coordinates: 44°48′N 18°31′E
- Country: Bosnia and Herzegovina
- Entity: Federation of Bosnia and Herzegovina
- Canton: Tuzla
- Municipality: Gradačac

Area
  - Total: 2.78 sq mi (7.20 km^{2})

Population (2013)
  - Total: 349
  - Density: 126/sq mi (48.5/km^{2})
- Time zone: UTC+1 (CET)
  - Summer (DST): UTC+2 (CEST)

Hrgovi Donji is a village in the municipality of Gradačac, Bosnia and Herzegovina.

== Demographics ==
According to the 2013 census, its population was 349.

Ethnicity in 2013
| Ethnicity | Number | Percentage |
|---|---|---|
| Croats | 261 | 74.8% |
| Bosniaks | 80 | 22.9% |
| Serbs | 4 | 1.1% |
| other/undeclared | 4 | 1.1% |
| Total | 349 | 100% |
