= Donja Dubica =

- Village
- Location within Bosnia and Herzegovina
- Coordinates: 45.0818569°N 18.3591839°E
- Country: Bosnia and Herzegovina
- Entity: Federation of Bosnia and Herzegovina
- Canton: Posavina
- Municipality: Odžak

Area
  - Total: 11.76 sq mi (30.47 km^{2})

Population (2013)
  - Total: 1,472
  - Density: 125.1/sq mi (48.31/km^{2})
- Time zone: UTC+1 (CET)
  - Summer (DST): UTC+2 (CEST)

Donja Dubica is a village in the municipality of Odžak, Bosnia and Herzegovina. It is located close to the Croatian border.

== Demographics ==
According to the 2013 census, its population was 1,472.

== History ==
In the Second World War, at the beginning of December 1944, the Croatian Ustasha committed mass slaughter in this village and in several other nearby villages with a Serbian majority (Trnjak, Zorice). 752 people were killed, of which 332 were children.

Ethnicity in 2013
Ethnicity	Number	Percentage
Croats	1,371	93.1%
Serbs	91	6.2%
Bosniaks	6	0.4%
other/undeclared	4	0.3%
Total	1,472	100%
