= Sjenina Rijeka =

Sjenina Rijeka Сјенина Ријека
- Village
- Location within Bosnia and Herzegovina
- Coordinates: 44°47′N 18°09′E
- Country: Bosnia and Herzegovina
- Entity: Republika Srpska; Federation of Bosnia and Herzegovina
- Region Canton: Doboj; Tuzla
- Municipality: Doboj; Doboj Istok

Area
  - Total: 1.95 sq mi (5.06 km^{2})

Population (2013)
  - Total: 449
  - Density: 230/sq mi (88.7/km^{2})
- Time zone: UTC+1 (CET)
  - Summer (DST): UTC+2 (CEST)

Sjenina Rijeka (Cyrillic: Сјенина Ријека) is a village in the municipalities of Doboj (Republika Srpska) and Doboj East, Bosnia and Herzegovina.

== Demographics ==
According to the 2013 census, its population was 449, all of them living in the Doboj municipality, thus none in the Doboj East part.

Ethnicity in 2013
Ethnicity	Number	Percentage
Bosniaks	413	92.0%
Serbs	30	6.7%
Croats	3	0.7%
other/undeclared	3	0.7%
Total	449	100%
