= Parsovići =

Parsovići Парсовићи
- Village
- Location within Bosnia and Herzegovina
- Coordinates: 43°46′N 17°49′E
- Country: Bosnia and Herzegovina
- Entity: Federation of Bosnia and Herzegovina
- Canton: Herzegovina-Neretva
- Municipality: Konjic

Area
  - Total: 0.63 sq mi (1.62 km^{2})

Population (2013)
  - Total: 148
  - Density: 237/sq mi (91.4/km^{2})
- Time zone: UTC+1 (CET)
  - Summer (DST): UTC+2 (CEST)

Parsovići (Cyrillic: Парсовићи) is a village in the municipality of Konjic, Bosnia and Herzegovina.

== Demographics ==
According to the 2013 census, its population was 148.

Ethnicity in 2013
Ethnicity	Number	Percentage
Bosniaks	136	91.9%
Croats	10	6.8%
other/undeclared	2	1.4%
Total	148	100%
