= Krakača =

- Village
- Location within Bosnia and Herzegovina
- Country: Bosnia and Herzegovina
- Entity: Federation of Bosnia and Herzegovina
- Canton: Una-Sana
- Municipality: Cazin

Area
  - Total: 2.91 sq mi (7.53 km^{2})

Population (2013)
  - Total: 911
  - Density: 313/sq mi (121/km^{2})
- Time zone: UTC+1 (CET)
  - Summer (DST): UTC+2 (CEST)

Krakača is a village in the municipality of Cazin, Bosnia and Herzegovina.

== Demographics ==
According to the 2013 census, its population was 911.

Ethnicity in 2013
Ethnicity	Number	Percentage
Bosniaks	851	93.4%
Croats	3	0.3%
other/undeclared	57	6.3%
Total	911	100%
