= Podvidača =

- Village
- Location within Bosnia and Herzegovina
- Coordinates: 44.842827°N 16.506329°E
- Country: Bosnia and Herzegovina
- Entity: Federation of Bosnia and Herzegovina
- Canton: Una-Sana
- Municipality: Sanski Most

Area
  - Total: 4.45 sq mi (11.53 km^{2})

Population (2013)
  - Total: 275
  - Density: 61.8/sq mi (23.9/km^{2})
- Time zone: UTC+1 (CET)
  - Summer (DST): UTC+2 (CEST)

Podvidača is a village in the municipality of Sanski Most, Federation of Bosnia and Herzegovina, Bosnia and Herzegovina.

== Demographics ==
According to the 2013 census, its population was 275.

Ethnicity in 2013
Ethnicity	Number	Percentage
Bosniaks	206	74.9%
Serbs	68	24.7%
Croats	1	0.4%
Total	275	100%
