= Hardomilje =

Village in Bosnia and Herzegovina

Hardomilje Хардомиље
- Village
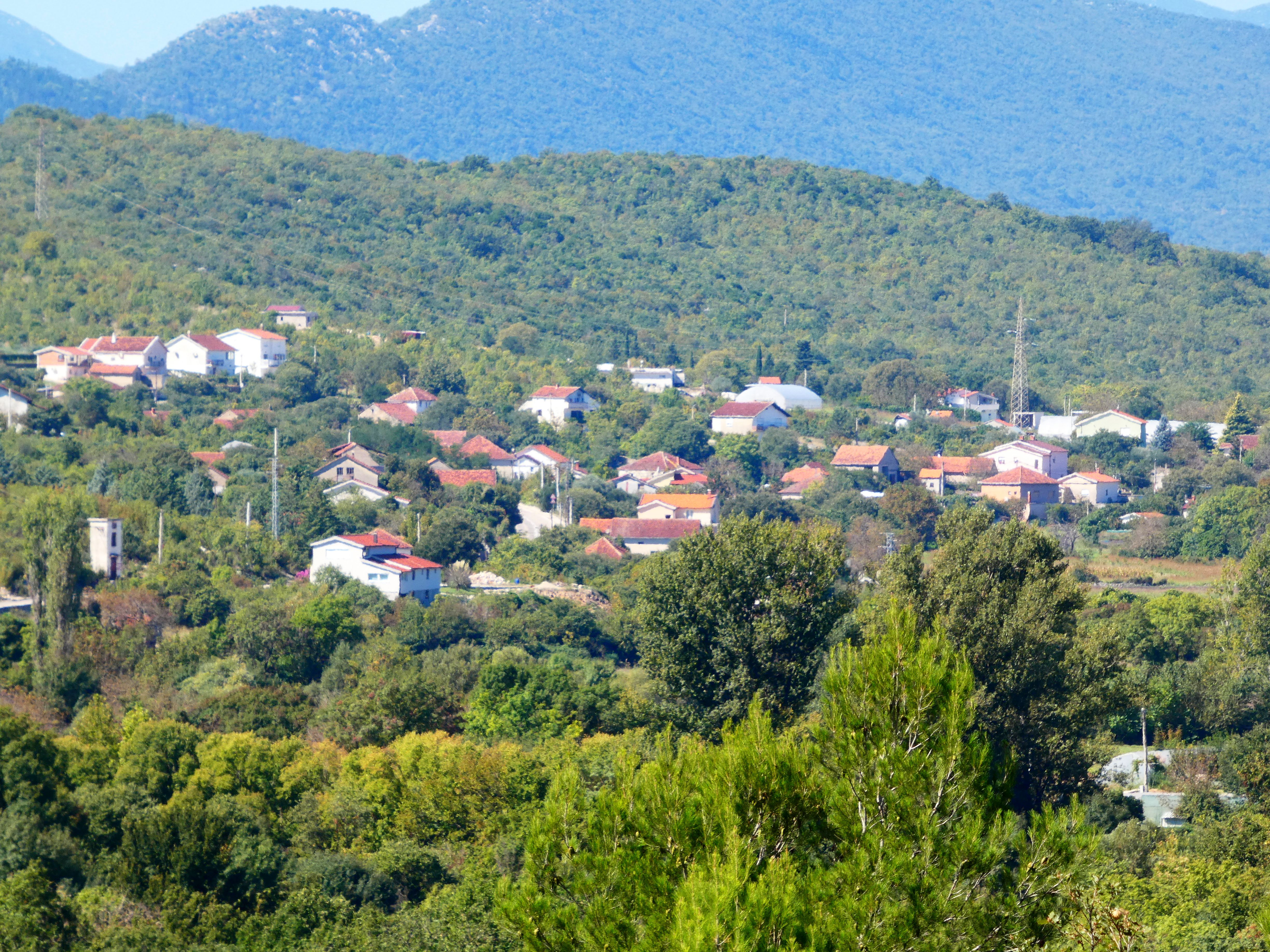

- Location within Bosnia and Herzegovina
- Coordinates: 43°09′N 17°33′E
- Country: Bosnia and Herzegovina
- Entity: Federation of Bosnia and Herzegovina
- Canton: West Herzegovina
- Municipality: Ljubuški

Area
  - Total: 3.63 sq mi (9.40 km^{2})

Population (2013)
  - Total: 889
  - Density: 245/sq mi (94.6/km^{2})
- Time zone: UTC+1 (CET)
  - Summer (DST): UTC+2 (CEST)

Hardomilje (Serbian: Хардомиље) is a village in Bosnia and Herzegovina. According to the 1991 census, the village is located in the municipality of Ljubuški.

== Demographics ==
According to the 2013 census, its population was 889.

Ethnicity in 2013
Ethnicity	Number	Percentage
Croats	886	99.7%
other/undeclared	3	0.3%
Total	889	100%
