= Bila, Vitez =

Bila
- Village
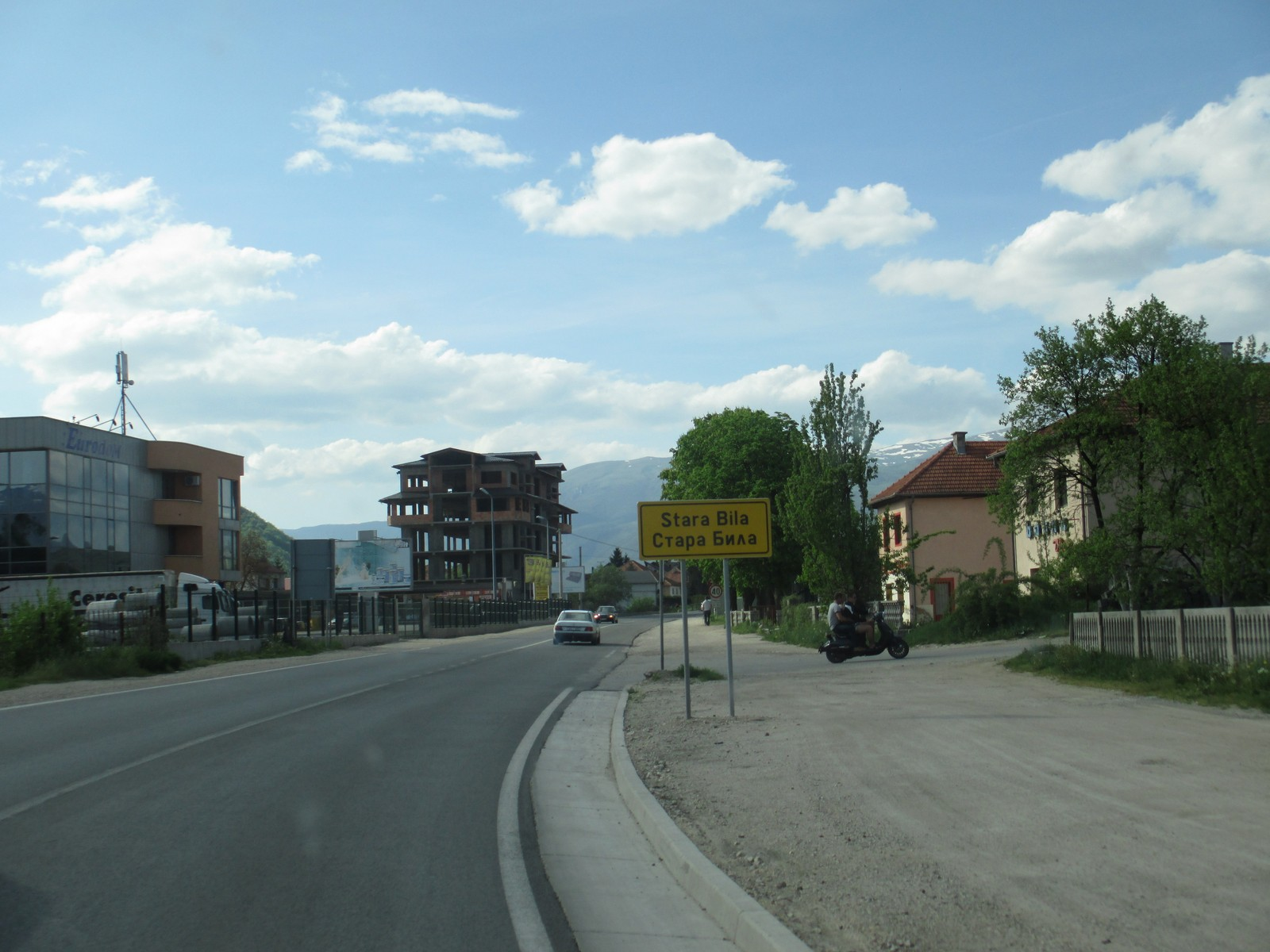

- Location within Bosnia and Herzegovina
- Coordinates: 44.1812403°N 17.7430929°E
- Country: Bosnia and Herzegovina
- Entity: Federation of Bosnia and Herzegovina
- Canton: Central Bosnia
- Municipality: Vitez

Area
  - Total: 0.64 sq mi (1.67 km^{2})

Population (2013)
  - Total: 1,545
  - Density: 2,400/sq mi (925/km^{2})
- Time zone: UTC+1 (CET)
  - Summer (DST): UTC+2 (CEST)

Bila is a village in the municipality of Vitez, Bosnia and Herzegovina.

== Demographics ==
According to the 2013 census, its population was 1,545.

Ethnicity in 2013
Ethnicity	Number	Percentage
Croats	1,368	88.5%
Bosniaks	121	7.8%
Serbs	37	2.4%
other/undeclared	19	1.2%
Total	1,545	100%
