= Donji Čajdraš =

Donji Čajdraš Доњи Чајдраш
- Village
- Location within Bosnia and Herzegovina
- Coordinates: 44°11′20″N 17°52′0″E
- Country: Bosnia and Herzegovina
- Entity: Federation of Bosnia and Herzegovina
- Canton: Zenica-Doboj
- Municipality: Zenica

Area
  - Total: 0.83 sq mi (2.15 km^{2})

Population (2013)
  - Total: 238
  - Density: 287/sq mi (111/km^{2})
- Time zone: UTC+1 (CET)
  - Summer (DST): UTC+2 (CEST)

Donji Čajdraš (Cyrillic: Доњи Чајдраш) is a village in the City of Zenica, Bosnia and Herzegovina.

== Demographics ==
According to the 2013 census, its population was 238.

Ethnicity in 2013
Ethnicity	Number	Percentage
Bosniaks	129	54.2%
Croats	105	44.1%
Serbs	3	1.3%
other/undeclared	1	0.4%
Total	238	100%
