= Donji Kakanj =

Village in Kakanj, Bosnia and Herzegovina

Donji Kakanj Доњи Какањ
- Village
- Location within Bosnia and Herzegovina
- Coordinates: 44°08′N 18°05′E
- Country: Bosnia and Herzegovina
- Entity: Federation of Bosnia and Herzegovina
- Canton: Zenica-Doboj
- Municipality: Kakanj

Area
  - Total: 0.22 sq mi (0.58 km^{2})

Population (2013)
  - Total: 14
  - Density: 63/sq mi (24/km^{2})
- Time zone: UTC+1 (CET)
  - Summer (DST): UTC+2 (CEST)

Donji Kakanj (Cyrillic: Доњи Какањ) is a village in the municipality of Kakanj, Bosnia and Herzegovina.

== Demographics ==
According to the 2013 census, its population was 14.

Ethnicity in 2013
Ethnicity	Number	Percentage
Bosniaks	13	92.9%
Croats	1	7.1%
Total	14	100%
