= Hrenovica =

- Village
- Location within Bosnia and Herzegovina
- Coordinates: 43°45′57″N 18°49′58″E
- Country: Bosnia and Herzegovina
- Entity: Federation of Bosnia and Herzegovina
- Canton: Bosnian-Podrinje Goražde
- Municipality: Pale-Prača

Area
  - Total: 4.34 km^{2} (1.68 sq mi)

Population (2013)
  - Total: 39
  - Density: 9.0/km^{2} (23/sq mi)
- Time zone: UTC+1 (CET)
  - Summer (DST): UTC+2 (CEST)

Hrenovica is a village in the municipality of Pale-Prača, Bosnia and Herzegovina. According to the 2013 census, the village has a population of 39.

== Demographics ==
According to the 2013 census, its population was 39.

Ethnicity in 2013
Ethnicity	Number	Percentage
Bosniaks	38	97.4%
Serbs	1	2.6%
Total	39	100%
