= Teskera =

- Village
- Location within Bosnia and Herzegovina
- Coordinates: 43°10′42″N 17°31′16″E
- Country: Bosnia and Herzegovina
- Entity: Federation of Bosnia and Herzegovina
- Canton: West Herzegovina
- Municipality: Ljubuški

Area
  - Total: 1.57 sq mi (4.06 km^{2})

Population (2013)
  - Total: 396
  - Density: 253/sq mi (97.5/km^{2})
- Time zone: UTC+1 (CET)
  - Summer (DST): UTC+2 (CEST)

Teskera is a village in Bosnia and Herzegovina. According to the 1991 census, the village is located in the municipality of Ljubuški.

== Demographics ==
According to the 2013 census, its population was 396, all Croats.
