= Lepnica =

- Village
- Location within Bosnia and Herzegovina
- Coordinates: 44.9637652°N 18.6936879°E
- Country: Bosnia and Herzegovina
- Entity: Federation of Bosnia and Herzegovina; Republika Srpska
- Canton Region: Posavina; Doboj
- Municipality: Orašje; Donji Žabar

Area
  - Total: 0.79 sq mi (2.04 km^{2})

Population (2013)
  - Total: 85
  - Density: 110/sq mi (42/km^{2})
- Time zone: UTC+1 (CET)
  - Summer (DST): UTC+2 (CEST)

Lepnica is a village in the municipalities of Orašje (Federation of Bosnia and Herzegovina) and Donji Žabar (Republika Srpska), Bosnia and Herzegovina.

== Demographics ==
According to the 2013 census, its population was 85, with 47 living in the Donji Žabar part and 38 in the Orašje part.

Ethnicity in 2013
Ethnicity	Number	Percentage
Serbs	54	63.5%
Croats	31	36.5%
Total	85	100%
