= Nević Polje =

- Village
- Location within Bosnia and Herzegovina
- Coordinates: 44.1970847°N 17.6989644°E
- Country: Bosnia and Herzegovina
- Entity: Federation of Bosnia and Herzegovina
- Canton: Central Bosnia
- Municipality: Novi Travnik

Area
  - Total: 0.84 sq mi (2.17 km^{2})

Population (2013)
  - Total: 733
  - Density: 875/sq mi (338/km^{2})
- Time zone: UTC+1 (CET)
  - Summer (DST): UTC+2 (CEST)

Nević Polje is a village in the municipality of Novi Travnik, Bosnia and Herzegovina.

== Demographics ==
According to the 2013 census, its population was 733.

Ethnicity in 2013
| Ethnicity | Number | Percentage |
|---|---|---|
| Croats | 712 | 97.1% |
| Bosniaks | 10 | 1.4% |
| Serbs | 5 | 0.7% |
| other/undeclared | 6 | 0.8% |
| Total | 733 | 100% |
