= Srednja Omanjska =

- Village
- Location within Bosnia and Herzegovina
- Coordinates: 44.6956266°N 17.9514458°E
- Country: Bosnia and Herzegovina
- Entity: Federation of Bosnia and Herzegovina
- Canton: Zenica-Doboj
- Municipality: Usora

Area
  - Total: 2.27 sq mi (5.89 km^{2})

Population (2013)
  - Total: 693
  - Density: 305/sq mi (118/km^{2})
- Time zone: UTC+1 (CET)
  - Summer (DST): UTC+2 (CEST)

Srednja Omanjska is a village in the municipality of Usora, Bosnia and Herzegovina.

== Demographics ==
According to the 2013 census, its population was 693.

Ethnicity in 2013
Ethnicity	Number	Percentage
Croats	678	97.8%
Bosniaks	8	1.2%
Serbs	2	0.3%
other/undeclared	5	0.7%
Total	693	100%
