= Pukiš =

- Village
- Location within Bosnia and Herzegovina
- Coordinates: 44.7725194°N 18.826541°E
- Country: Bosnia and Herzegovina
- Entity: Republika Srpska; Federation of Bosnia and Herzegovina
- Region Canton: Bijeljina; Tuzla
- Municipality: Lopare; Čelić

Area
  - Total: 2.28 sq mi (5.90 km^{2})

Population (2013)
  - Total: 519
  - Density: 228/sq mi (88.0/km^{2})
- Time zone: UTC+1 (CET)
  - Summer (DST): UTC+2 (CEST)

Pukiš is a village in the municipalities of Lopare (Republika Srpska) and Čelić, Tuzla Canton, Bosnia and Herzegovina.

== Demographics ==
According to the 2013 census, its population was 519, all of them living in the Lopare part, thus none in Čelić.

Ethnicity in 2013
Ethnicity	Number	Percentage
Serbs	515	99.2%
Croats	3	0.6%
other/undeclared	1	0.2%
Total	519	100%
