= Ćesim =

Ćesim Ћесим
- Village
- Location within Bosnia and Herzegovina
- Coordinates: 43°29′N 18°03′E
- Country: Bosnia and Herzegovina
- Entity: Federation of Bosnia and Herzegovina; Republika Srpska
- Canton: Herzegovina-Neretva
- Municipality: Konjic; Nevesinje

Area
  - Total: 9.22 km^{2} (3.56 sq mi)

Population (2013)
  - Total: 5
  - Density: 0.54/km^{2} (1.4/sq mi)
- Time zone: UTC+1 (CET)
  - Summer (DST): UTC+2 (CEST)

Ćesim (Cyrillic: Ћесим) is a village in the municipalities of Konjic and Nevesinje, Bosnia and Herzegovina.

== Demographics ==
According to the 2013 census, its population was 5, all Serbs in the Nevesinje municipality.
