= Argud =

Argud Аргуд
- Village
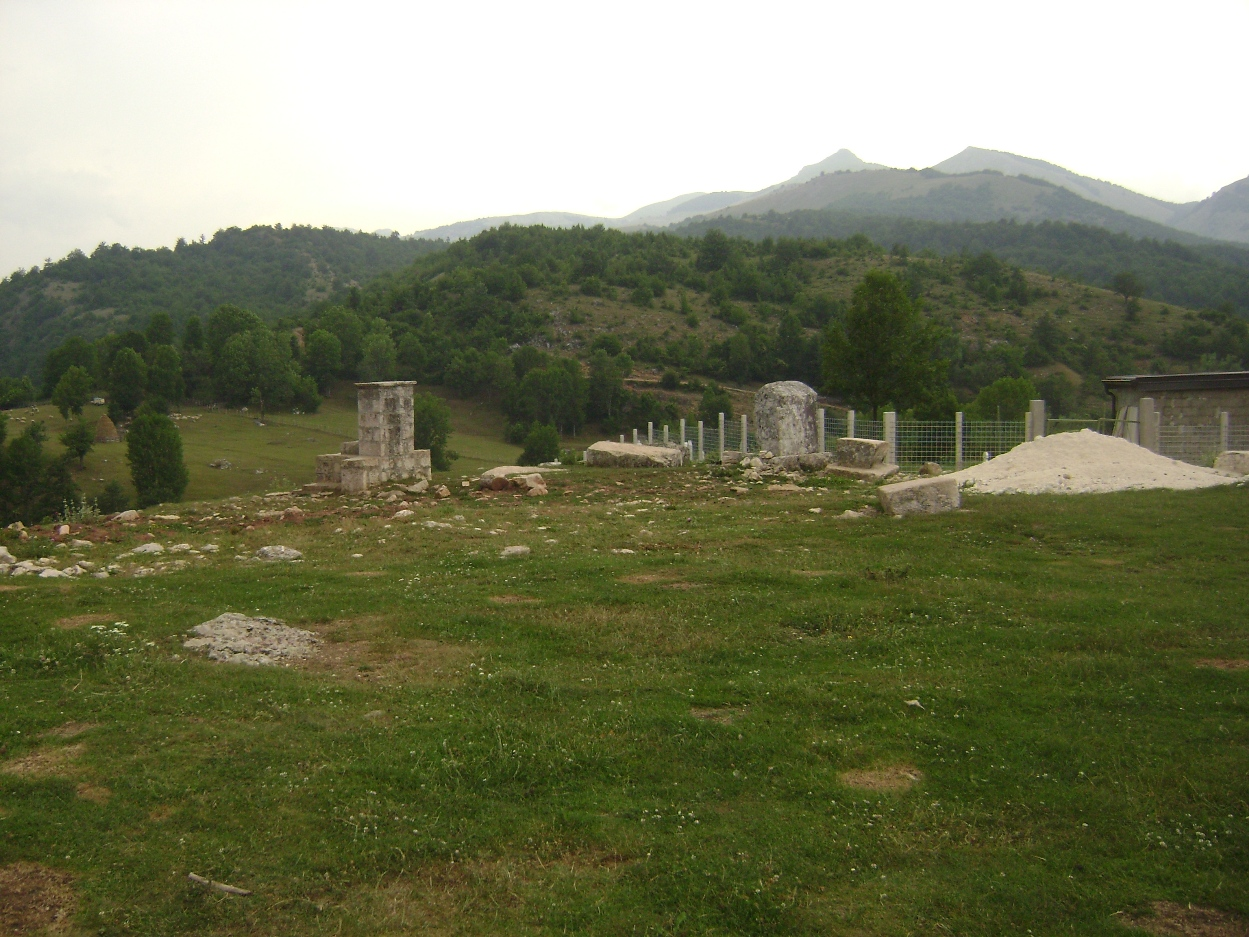

- Location within Bosnia and Herzegovina
- Coordinates: 43°31′N 18°17′E
- Country: Bosnia and Herzegovina
- Entity: Federation of Bosnia and Herzegovina
- Canton: Herzegovina-Neretva
- Municipality: Konjic

Area
  - Total: 1.73 sq mi (4.48 km^{2})

Population (2013)
  - Total: 33
  - Density: 19/sq mi (7.4/km^{2})
- Time zone: UTC+1 (CET)
  - Summer (DST): UTC+2 (CEST)

Argud (Cyrillic: Аргуд) is a village in the municipality of Konjic, Bosnia and Herzegovina.

== Demographics ==
According to the 2013 census, its population was 33, all Bosniaks.
