= Gudavac =

Gudavac Гудавац
- Village
- Location within Bosnia and Herzegovina
- Coordinates: 44°50′01″N 16°09′16″E
- Country: Bosnia and Herzegovina
- Entity: Federation of Bosnia and Herzegovina
- Canton: Una-Sana
- Municipality: Bosanska Krupa

Area
  - Total: 3.48 sq mi (9.01 km^{2})

Population (2013)
  - Total: 14
  - Density: 4.0/sq mi (1.6/km^{2})
- Time zone: UTC+1 (CET)
  - Summer (DST): UTC+2 (CEST)

Gudavac (Serbian Cyrillic: Гудавац) is a village in the municipality of Bosanska Krupa, Bosnia and Herzegovina.

== Demographics ==
According to the 2013 census, its population was 14.

Ethnicity in 2013
Ethnicity	Number	Percentage
Serbs	11	78.6%
Bosniaks	1	7.1%
Croats	1	7.1%
other/undeclared	1	7.1%
Total	14	100%
