= Glavica, Glamoč =

Glavica Главица
- Village
- Location within Bosnia and Herzegovina
- Coordinates: 44°06′38″N 16°45′58″E
- Country: Bosnia and Herzegovina
- Entity: Federation of Bosnia and Herzegovina
- Canton: Canton 10
- Municipality: Glamoč

Area
  - Total: 53.29 km^{2} (20.58 sq mi)

Population (2013)
  - Total: 57
  - Density: 1.1/km^{2} (2.8/sq mi)
- Time zone: UTC+1 (CET)
  - Summer (DST): UTC+2 (CEST)

Glavica (Serbian Cyrillic: Главица) or Glavice (Serbian Cyrillic: Главице) is a village in the Municipality of Glamoč in Canton 10 of the Federation of Bosnia and Herzegovina, an entity of Bosnia and Herzegovina.

== Demographics ==
According to the 2013 census, its population was 57.

Ethnicity in 2013
Ethnicity	Number	Percentage
Serbs	46	80.7%
Croats	8	14.0%
Bosniaks	3	5.3%
Total	57	100%

== Bibliography ==
- Ethnicity/National Affiliation, Religion and Mother Tongue (PDF). Sarajevo: Agency for Statistics of Bosnia and Herzegovina. 2019.
