= Cerik (Brčko) =

Cerik Церик
- Village
- Location within Bosnia and Herzegovina
- Coordinates: 44°48′25″N 18°31′49″E
- Country: Bosnia and Herzegovina
- Entity: Brčko District

Area
  - Total: 2.67 sq mi (6.92 km^{2})

Population (2013)
  - Total: 233
  - Density: 87.2/sq mi (33.7/km^{2})
- Time zone: UTC+1 (CET)
  - Summer (DST): UTC+2 (CEST)

Cerik (Serbian Cyrillic: Церик) is a village in the municipality of Brčko, Bosnia and Herzegovina.

== Demographics ==
According to the 2013 census, its population was 233.

Ethnicity in 2013
| Ethnicity | Number | Percentage |
|---|---|---|
| Serbs | 91 | 39.1% |
| Bosniaks | 85 | 36.5% |
| Croats | 45 | 19.3% |
| other/undeclared | 12 | 5.2% |
| Total | 233 | 100% |
