= Šibošnica =

- Village
- Location within Bosnia and Herzegovina
- Coordinates: 44.6662301°N 18.7245889°E
- Country: Bosnia and Herzegovina
- Entity: Federation of Bosnia and Herzegovina
- Canton: Tuzla
- Municipality: Čelić

Area
  - Total: 1.30 sq mi (3.37 km^{2})

Population (2013)
  - Total: 241
  - Density: 185/sq mi (71.5/km^{2})
- Time zone: UTC+1 (CET)
  - Summer (DST): UTC+2 (CEST)

Šibošnica is a village in the municipality of Čelić, Bosnia and Herzegovina.

== Demographics ==
According to the 2013 census, its population was 241.

Ethnicity in 2013
Ethnicity	Number	Percentage
Bosniaks	227	94.2%
Serbs	8	3.3%
other/undeclared	6	2.5%
Total	241	100%
