= Muslići =

Muslići Муслићи
- Village
- Location within Bosnia and Herzegovina
- Coordinates: 44°51′01″N 15°49′11″E
- Country: Bosnia and Herzegovina
- Entity: Federation of Bosnia and Herzegovina
- Canton: Una-Sana
- Municipality: Bihać

Area
  - Total: 1.29 sq mi (3.34 km^{2})

Population (2013)
  - Total: 430
  - Density: 330/sq mi (130/km^{2})
- Time zone: UTC+1 (CET)
  - Summer (DST): UTC+2 (CEST)

for the village in Montenegro see Muslići, Montenegro

Muslići (Serbian Cyrillic: Муслићи) is a village in the municipality of Bihać, Bosnia and Herzegovina.

== Demographics ==
According to the 2013 census, its population was 430.

Ethnicity in 2013
| Ethnicity | Number | Percentage |
|---|---|---|
| Bosniaks | 419 | 97.4% |
| Serbs | 1 | 0.2% |
| other/undeclared | 10 | 2.4% |
| Total | 430 | 100% |
