= Potočari, Brčko =

Potočari
- Village
- Location within Bosnia and Herzegovina
- Coordinates: 44.8175183°N 18.7953757°E
- Country: Bosnia and Herzegovina
- Entity: Brčko District

Area
  - Total: 3.35 sq mi (8.67 km^{2})

Population (2013)
  - Total: 1,063
  - Density: 318/sq mi (123/km^{2})
- Time zone: UTC+1 (CET)
  - Summer (DST): UTC+2 (CEST)

Potočari is a village in the municipality of Brčko, Bosnia and Herzegovina.

== Demographics ==
According to the 2013 census, its population was 1,063.

Ethnicity in 2013
Ethnicity	Number	Percentage
Serbs	1,046	98.4%
Croats	4	0.4%
Bosniaks	1	0.1%
other/undeclared	12	1.1%
Total	1,063	100%
