= Ribnica Dio =

- Village
- Location within Bosnia and Herzegovina
- Coordinates: 44.3450726°N 18.389568°E
- Country: Bosnia and Herzegovina
- Entity: Federation of Bosnia and Herzegovina
- Canton: Zenica-Doboj
- Municipality: Zavidovići

Area
  - Total: 13.42 sq mi (34.75 km^{2})

Population (2013)
  - Total: 1,016
  - Density: 75.72/sq mi (29.24/km^{2})
- Time zone: UTC+1 (CET)
  - Summer (DST): UTC+2 (CEST)

Ribnica Dio is a village in the municipality of Zavidovići, Bosnia and Herzegovina. It is located on the banks of the Krivaja River.

== Demographics ==
According to the 2013 census, its population was 1,016.

Ethnicity in 2013
Ethnicity	Number	Percentage
Bosniaks	993	97.7%
Serbs	9	0.9%
Croats	1	0.1%
other/undeclared	13	1.3%
Total	1,016	100%
