= Zvijezda, Vareš =

Zvijezda
- Village
- Location within Bosnia and Herzegovina
- Coordinates: 44.1749834°N 18.4071537°E
- Country: Bosnia and Herzegovina
- Entity: Federation of Bosnia and Herzegovina
- Canton: Zenica-Doboj
- Municipality: Vareš

Area
  - Total: 5.87 sq mi (15.21 km^{2})

Population (2013)
  - Total: 23
  - Density: 3.9/sq mi (1.5/km^{2})
- Time zone: UTC+1 (CET)
  - Summer (DST): UTC+2 (CEST)

Zvijezda is a village in the municipality of Vareš, Bosnia and Herzegovina.

== Demographics ==
According to the 2013 census, its population was 23.

Ethnicity in 2013
Ethnicity	Number	Percentage
Croats	18	78.3%
Serbs	1	4.3%
other/undeclared	4	17.4%
Total	23	100%
