= Orahovlje =

- Village
- Location within Bosnia and Herzegovina
- Country: Bosnia and Herzegovina
- Entity: Federation of Bosnia and Herzegovina
- Canton: West Herzegovina
- Municipality: Ljubuški

Area
  - Total: 0.83 sq mi (2.14 km^{2})

Population (2013)
  - Total: 216
  - Density: 261/sq mi (101/km^{2})
- Time zone: UTC+1 (CET)
  - Summer (DST): UTC+2 (CEST)

Orahovlje is a village in Bosnia and Herzegovina. According to the 1991 census, the village is located in the municipality of Ljubuški.

== Demographics ==
According to the 2013 census, its population was 216.

Ethnicity in 2013
Ethnicity	Number	Percentage
Croats	213	98.6%
Serbs	3	1.4%
Total	216	100%
