= Privalj =

Privalj Приваљ
- Village
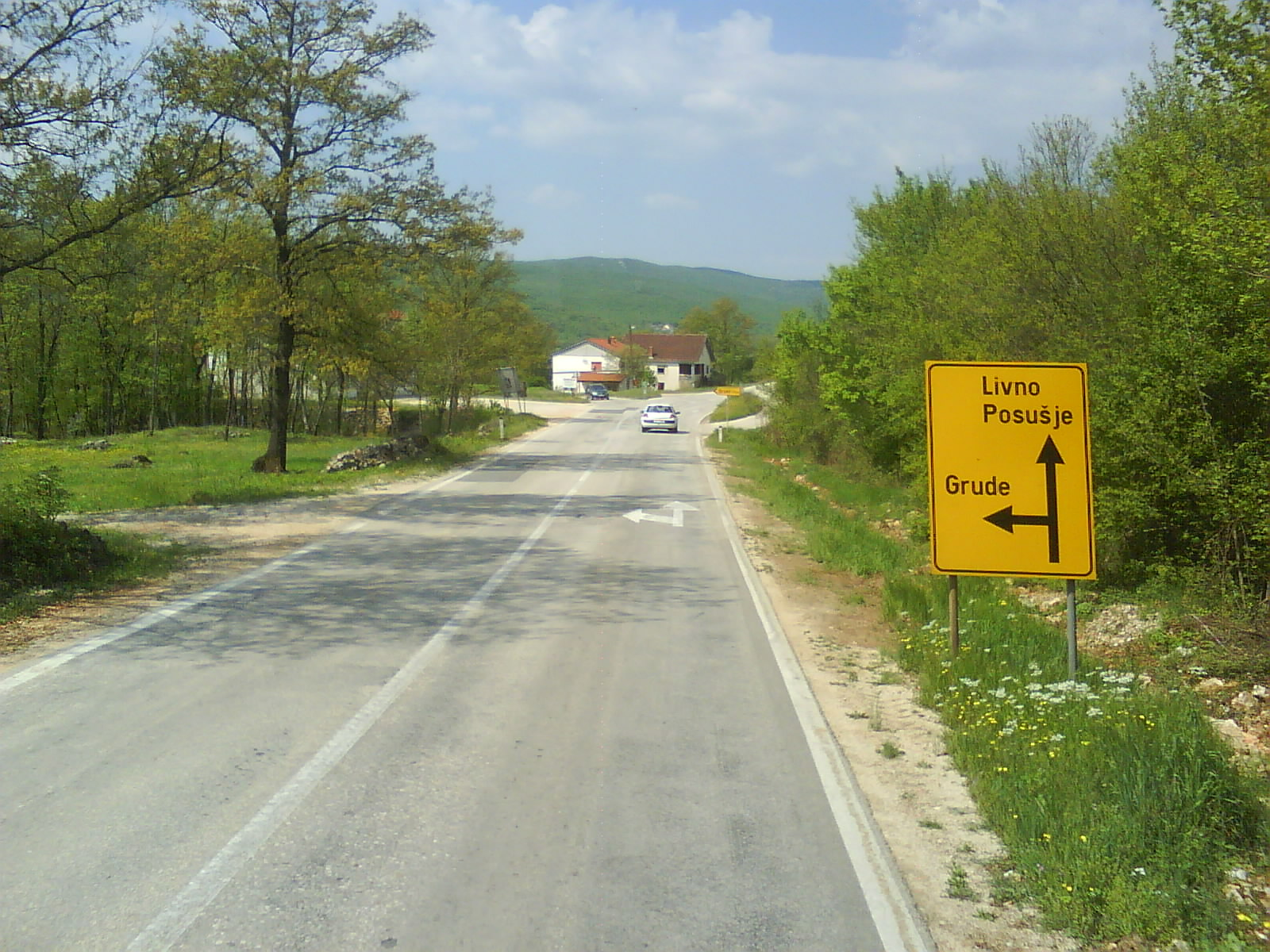
- Crossroads in Privalj village

- Location within Bosnia and Herzegovina
- Country: Bosnia and Herzegovina
- Entity: Federation of Bosnia and Herzegovina
- Canton: West Herzegovina
- Municipality: Široki Brijeg

Area
  - Total: 2.96 sq mi (7.66 km^{2})

Population (2013)
  - Total: 413
  - Density: 140/sq mi (53.9/km^{2})
- Time zone: UTC+1 (CET)
  - Summer (DST): UTC+2 (CEST)

Privalj (Serbian Cyrillic: Приваљ) is a village in Bosnia and Herzegovina. According to the 1991 census, the village is located in the municipality of Široki Brijeg.

== Demographics ==
According to the 2013 census, its population was 413, all Croats.
