= Brdari =

- Village
- Location within Bosnia and Herzegovina
- Coordinates: 44.803740°N 16.602733°E
- Country: Bosnia and Herzegovina
- Entity: Federation of Bosnia and Herzegovina
- Canton: Una-Sana
- Municipality: Sanski Most

Area
  - Total: 2.37 sq mi (6.13 km^{2})

Population (2013)
  - Total: 443
  - Density: 187/sq mi (72.3/km^{2})
- Time zone: UTC+1 (CET)
  - Summer (DST): UTC+2 (CEST)

Brdari is a village in the municipality of Sanski Most, Federation of Bosnia and Herzegovina, Bosnia and Herzegovina.

== Demographics ==
According to the 2013 census, its population was 443.

Ethnicity in 2013
Ethnicity	Number	Percentage
Bosniaks	385	86.9%
Serbs	51	11.5%
Croats	6	1.4%
other/undeclared	1	0.2%
Total	443	100%
