= Šići =

- Village
- Location within Bosnia and Herzegovina
- Coordinates: 44.5196348°N 18.5738468°E
- Country: Bosnia and Herzegovina
- Entity: Federation of Bosnia and Herzegovina
- Canton: Tuzla
- Municipality: Tuzla

Area
  - Total: 0.84 sq mi (2.17 km^{2})

Population (2013)
  - Total: 951
  - Density: 1,140/sq mi (438/km^{2})
- Time zone: UTC+1 (CET)
  - Summer (DST): UTC+2 (CEST)

Šići is a village in the municipality of Tuzla, Tuzla Canton, Bosnia and Herzegovina.

== Demographics ==
According to the 2013 census, its population was 951.

Ethnicity in 2013
Ethnicity	Number	Percentage
Bosniaks	876	92.1%
Croats	6	0.6%
Serbs	2	0.2%
other/undeclared	67	7.0%
Total	951	100%
