= Poriče =

- City
- Location within Bosnia and Herzegovina
- Country: Bosnia and Herzegovina
- Entity: Federation of Bosnia and Herzegovina
- Canton: Central Bosnia
- Municipality: Bugojno

Area
  - Total: 9.28 sq mi (24.04 km^{2})

Population (2013)
  - Total: 488
  - Density: 52.6/sq mi (20.3/km^{2})
- Time zone: UTC+1 (CET)
  - Summer (DST): UTC+2 (CEST)

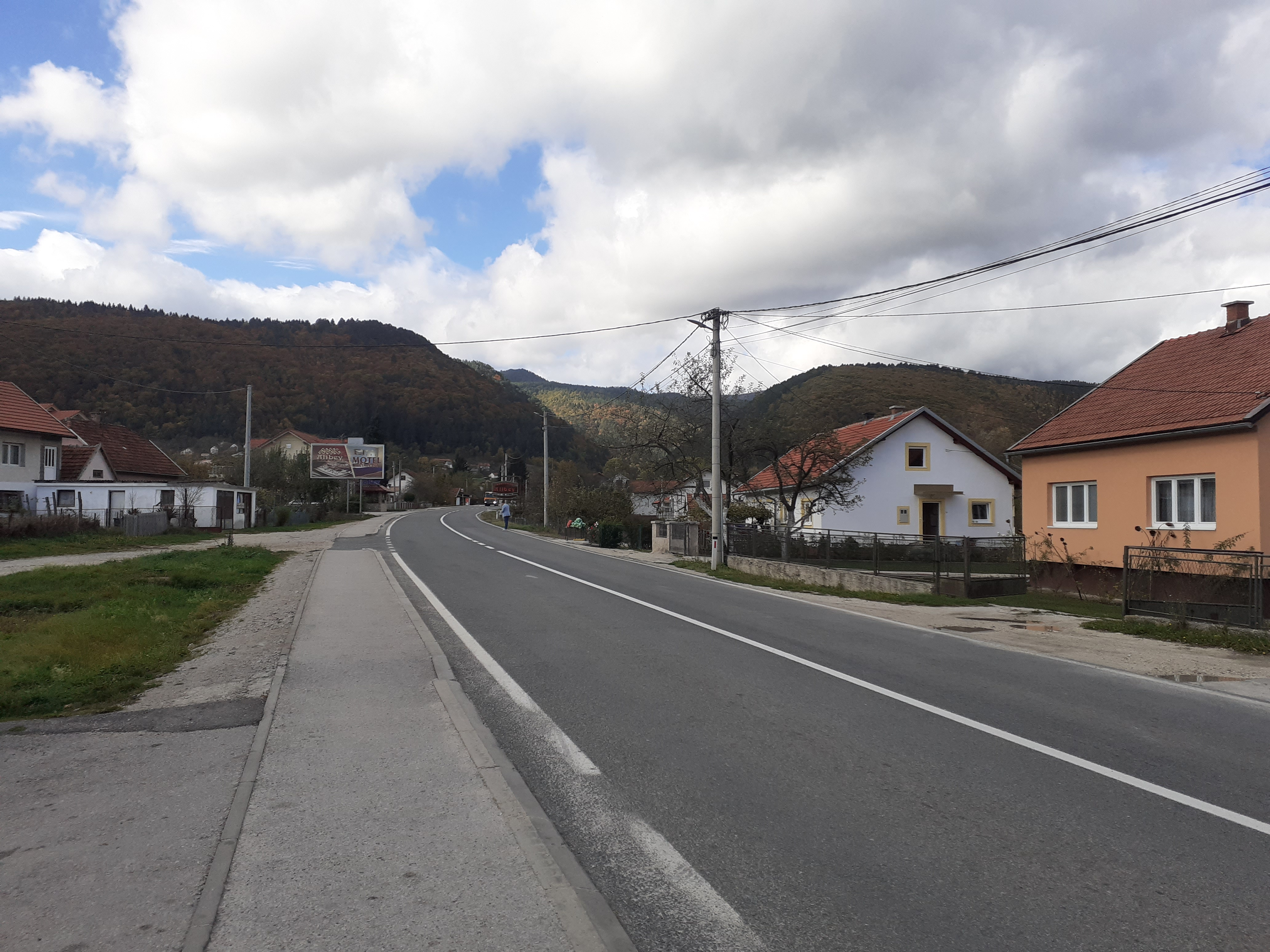
Main road M16 Bugojno - Kupres, Poriče

Poriče is a city in the municipality of Bugojno, Bosnia and Herzegovina.

== History ==
The HPD "Stožer" owned a mountain hut at 1,100 metres (3,600 ft) on Koprivnica, but it was burned down in the spring of 1942 during the Serbian anti-fascist uprising or its suppression.

== Demographics ==
According to the 2013 census, its population was 488.

Ethnicity in 2013
Ethnicity	Number	Percentage
Bosniaks	447	91.6%
Croats	37	7.6%
Serbs	2	0.4%
other/undeclared	2	0.4%
Total	488	100%
