= Hotonj =

- Location within Bosnia and Herzegovina
- Country: Bosnia and Herzegovina
- Entity: Federation of Bosnia and Herzegovina
- Canton: Sarajevo
- Municipality: Vogošća

Area
  - Total: 1.27 sq mi (3.28 km^{2})

Population (2013)
  - Total: 4,580
  - Density: 3,620/sq mi (1,400/km^{2})
- Time zone: UTC+1 (CET)
  - Summer (DST): UTC+2 (CEST)

Hotonj is a settlement in Vogošća municipality near Sarajevo, Federation of Bosnia and Herzegovina, Bosnia and Herzegovina.

== History ==
During the 1992-1995 war, it was the front line between Serb forces and Bosnian Army, so it suffered destruction mainly from light weapons. After the war it became an integral part of the Federation of Bosnia and Herzegovina, so most Serbs moved out, and housing has been bought by Bosniaks. Additionally, it has undergone intensive construction (Mosques, sport fields, oil pumps, renewed and widened asphalt roads, etc.) since 2000 because of its appealing position between Sarajevo and Vogošća.

== Demographics ==
According to the 2013 census, its population was 4580.

Ethnicity in 2013
Ethnicity	Number	Percentage
Bosniaks	4,372	95.5%
Serbs	37	0.8%
Croats	19	0.4%
other/undeclared	152	3.3%
Total	4,580	100%
