= Stražbenica (Banovići) =

- Village
- Location within Bosnia and Herzegovina
- Coordinates: 44°24′36″N 18°28′48″E
- Country: Bosnia and Herzegovina
- Entity: Federation of Bosnia and Herzegovina
- Canton: Tuzla
- Municipality: Banovići

Area
  - Total: 0.25 sq mi (0.64 km^{2})

Population (2013)
  - Total: 1,274
  - Density: 5,200/sq mi (2,000/km^{2})
- Time zone: UTC+1 (CET)
  - Summer (DST): UTC+2 (CEST)

Stražbenica is a village in the municipality of Banovići, Bosnia and Herzegovina.

== Demographics ==
According to the 2013 census, its population was 1,274.

Ethnicity in 2013
Ethnicity	Number	Percentage
Bosniaks	1,264	99.2%
other/undeclared	10	0.8%
Total	1,274	100%
