= Ljusina =

Ljusina Љусина
- Village
- Location within Bosnia and Herzegovina
- Coordinates: 44°57′00″N 16°08′20″E
- Country: Bosnia and Herzegovina
- Entity: Federation of Bosnia and Herzegovina
- Canton: Una-Sana
- Municipality: Bosanska Krupa

Area
  - Total: 5.69 sq mi (14.73 km^{2})

Population (2013)
  - Total: 1,237
  - Density: 217.5/sq mi (83.98/km^{2})
- Time zone: UTC+1 (CET)
  - Summer (DST): UTC+2 (CEST)

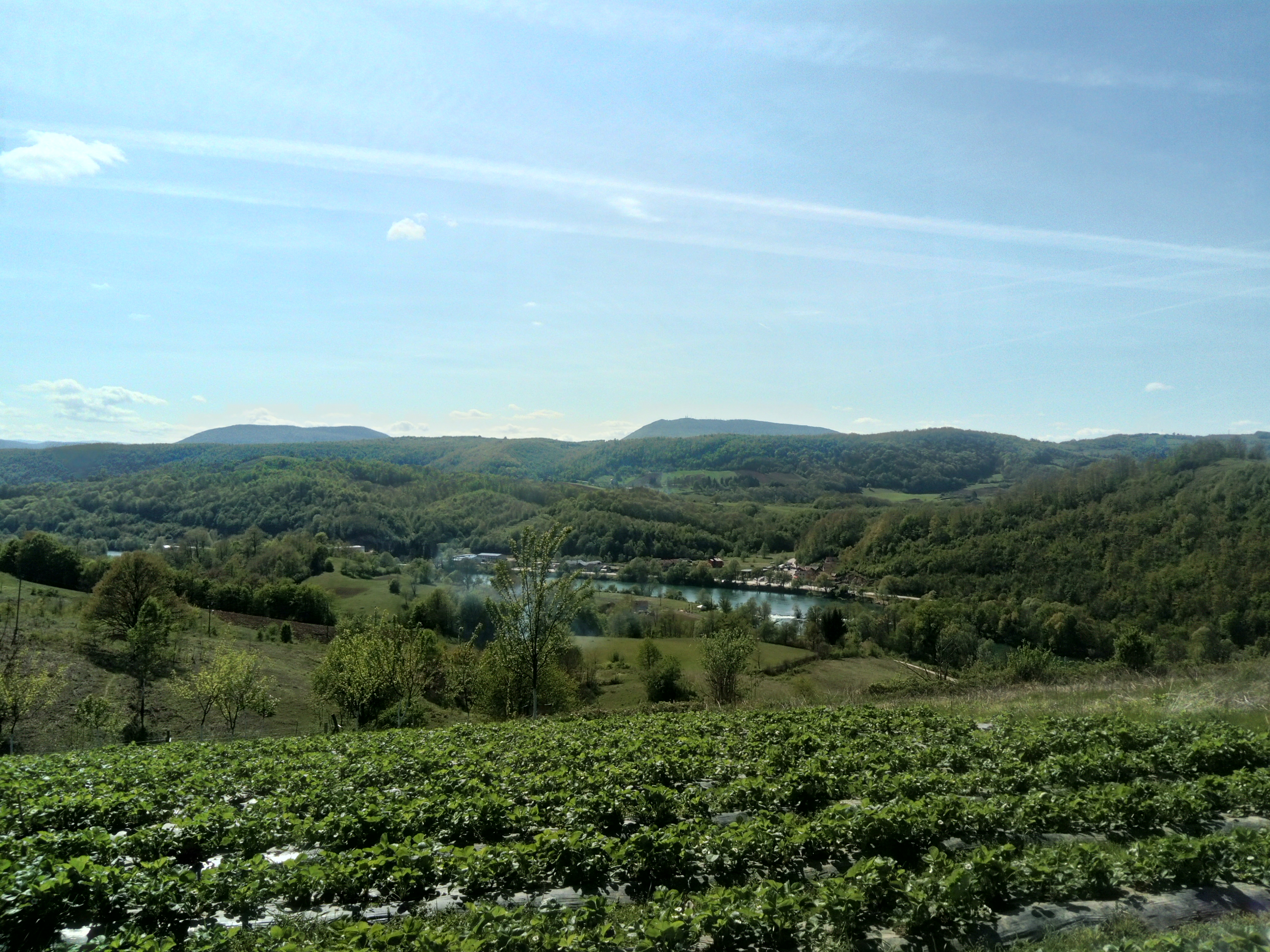
Landscape image of Ljusina

Ljusina (Serbian Cyrillic: Љусина) is a village in the municipality of Bosanska Krupa, Bosnia and Herzegovina.

== Demographics ==
According to the 2013 census, its population was 1,237.

Ethnicity in 2013
Ethnicity	Number	Percentage
Bosniaks	1,228	99.3%
other/undeclared	9	0.7%
Total	1,237	100%
