= Donji Lukavac, Gradačac =

Donji Lukavac
- Village
- Location within Bosnia and Herzegovina
- Coordinates: 44°50′12″N 18°26′46″E
- Country: Bosnia and Herzegovina
- Entity: Federation of Bosnia and Herzegovina
- Canton: Tuzla
- Municipality: Gradačac

Area
  - Total: 1.43 sq mi (3.71 km^{2})

Population (2013)
  - Total: 836
  - Density: 584/sq mi (225/km^{2})
- Time zone: UTC+1 (CET)
  - Summer (DST): UTC+2 (CEST)

Donji Lukavac is a village in the municipality of Gradačac, Bosnia and Herzegovina.

== Demographics ==
According to the 2013 census, its population was 836.

Ethnicity in 2013
Ethnicity	Number	Percentage
Bosniaks	829	99.2%
other/undeclared	7	0.8%
Total	836	100%
