= Suha, Živinice =

Suha
- Village
- Location within Bosnia and Herzegovina
- Coordinates: 44.4501°N 18.5507°E
- Country: Bosnia and Herzegovina
- Entity: Federation of Bosnia and Herzegovina
- Canton: Tuzla
- Municipality: Živinice

Area
  - Total: 4.43 sq mi (11.47 km^{2})

Population (2013)
  - Total: 2,007
  - Density: 453.2/sq mi (175.0/km^{2})
- Time zone: UTC+1 (CET)
  - Summer (DST): UTC+2 (CEST)

Suha is a village in the municipality of Živinice, Bosnia and Herzegovina.

== Demographics ==
According to the 2013 census, its population was 2,007.

Ethnicity in 2013
Ethnicity	Number	Percentage
Bosniaks	1,974	98.4%
other/undeclared	33	1.6%
Total	2,007	100%
