= Novi Grad, Odžak =

Novi Grad
- Village
- Location within Bosnia and Herzegovina
- Coordinates: 45.0904147°N 18.3216868°E
- Country: Bosnia and Herzegovina
- Entity: Federation of Bosnia and Herzegovina
- Canton: Posavina
- Municipality: Odžak

Area
  - Total: 7.92 sq mi (20.52 km^{2})

Population (2013)
  - Total: 362
  - Density: 45.7/sq mi (17.6/km^{2})
- Time zone: UTC+1 (CET)
  - Summer (DST): UTC+2 (CEST)

Novi Grad is a village in the municipality of Odžak, Bosnia and Herzegovina. It is located close to the Croatian border.

== Demographics ==
According to the 2013 census, its population was 362.

Ethnicity in 2013
Ethnicity	Number	Percentage
Serbs	225	62.2%
Croats	124	34.3%
Bosniaks	1	0.3%
other/undeclared	12	3.3%
Total	362	100%
