= Brvnik =

Brvnik Брвник (Serbian)
- Village (Selo)
- Location within Bosnia and Herzegovina
- Coordinates: 45°00′54″N 18°33′38″E
- Country: Bosnia and Herzegovina
- Entity: Federation of Bosnia and Herzegovina; Republika Srpska
- Canton Region: Posavina; Doboj
- Municipality: Domaljevac-Šamac; Šamac

Area
  - Total: 4.29 sq mi (11.10 km^{2})

Population (2013)
  - Total: 296
  - Density: 69.1/sq mi (26.7/km^{2})
- Time zone: UTC+1 (CET)
  - Summer (DST): UTC+2 (CEST)

Brvnik (Serbian Cyrillic: Брвник) is a village in the municipalities of Domaljevac-Šamac, Posavina Canton and Šamac, Republika Srpska, Bosnia and Herzegovina.

== Demographics ==
According to the 2013 census, its population was 296, with 256 living in the Šamac part and 40 in the Domaljevac-Šamac part.

Ethnicity in 2013
Ethnicity	Number	Percentage
Serbs	283	95.6%
Croats	3	1.0%
Bosniaks	1	0.3%
other/undeclared	9	3.0%
Total	296	100%
