= Blatnica, Zenica =

Blatnica Блатница
- Village
- Location within Bosnia and Herzegovina
- Coordinates: 44.4253552°N 17.831712°E
- Country: Bosnia and Herzegovina
- Entity: Republika Srpska; Federation of Bosnia and Herzegovina
- Region Canton: Sarajevo; Zenica-Doboj
- Municipality: Teslić; Zenica

Area
  - Total: 22.42 sq mi (58.08 km^{2})

Population (2013)
  - Total: 1,254
  - Density: 55.92/sq mi (21.59/km^{2})
- Time zone: UTC+1 (CET)
  - Summer (DST): UTC+2 (CEST)
- Area code: +387

Blatnica (Serbian Cyrillic: Блатница) is a settlement in the Bosnia and Herzegovina, Federacija Bosne i Hercegovine entity, Zenica Municipality.

Before the War in Bosnia and Herzegovina, the village was entirely part of the Teslić Municipality; After the war ended, its territory was partially attached to the municipality of Zenica, integrated into the Federation of Bosnia and Herzegovina.

== Population ==
=== Census of 1991 ===
Ethnic Group	Number	%
Serbs	2,768	95,77
Yugoslavs	60	2,07
Croats	40	1,38
Bosniaks	7	0,24
Others	15	0,51

=== Population 1997 - 1991 ===
Blatnica Total population 2013: 5
Census Year	1991.	1981.	1971.
Serbs	2 768 (95,78%)	2 777 (94,26%)	2 650 (97,53%)
Croats	40 (1,384%)	29 (0,984%)	39 (1,435%)
Bosniaks	7 (0,242%)	10 (0,339%)	7 (0,258%)
Crnogorci	–	6 (0,204%)	5 (0,184%)
Albanians	–	3 (0,102%)	–
Yugoslavs	60 (2,076%)	109 (3,700%)	7 (0,258%)
Other and Unknown	15 (0,519%)	12 (0,407%)	9 (0,331%)
Total	2 890	2 946	2 717

== See also ==
- Municipalities in Bosnia and Herzegovina
