= Cerovica, Neum =

Cerovica
- Village
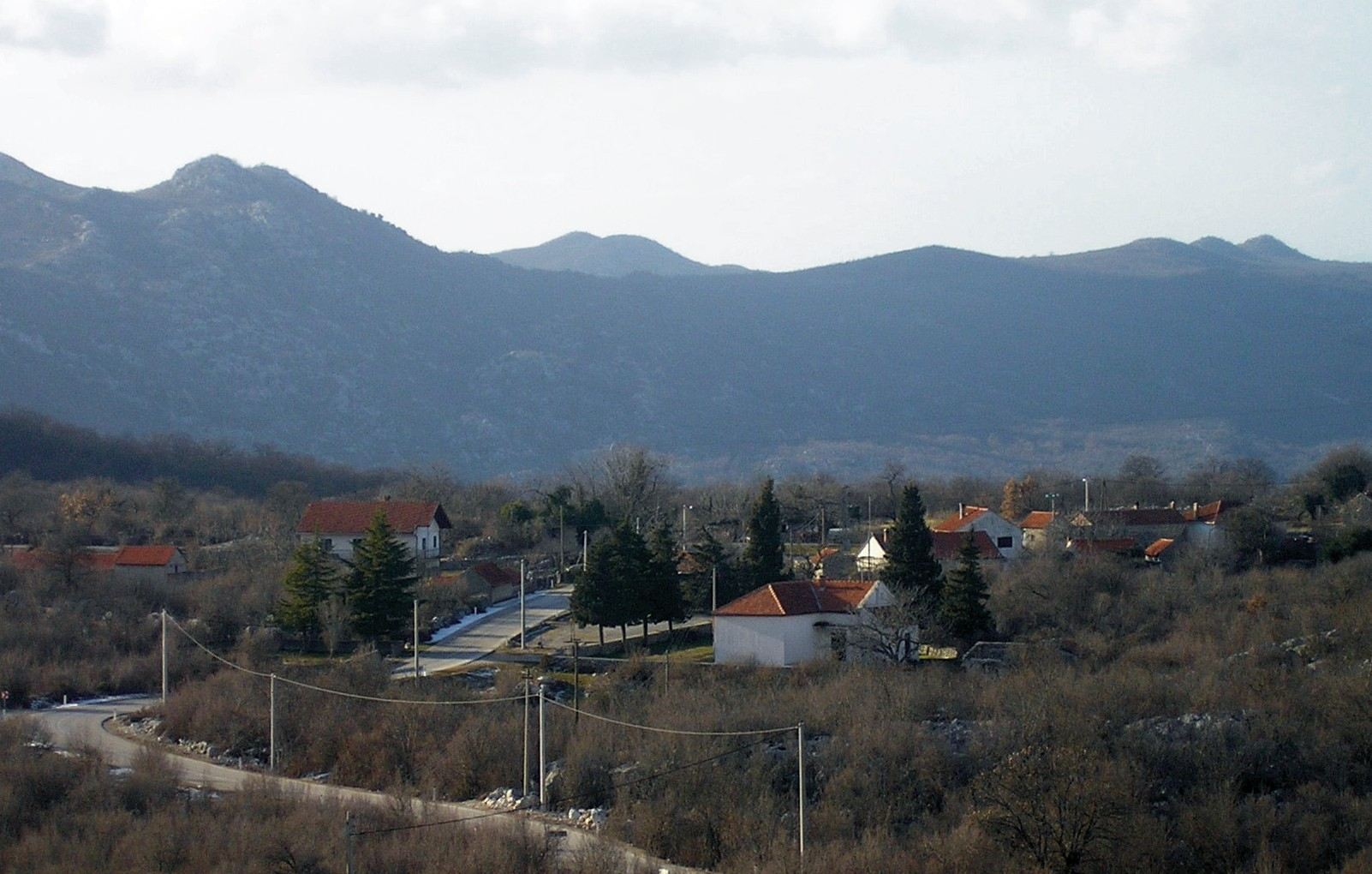

- Location within Bosnia and Herzegovina
- Coordinates: 42.9850°N 17.8092°E
- Country: Bosnia and Herzegovina
- Entity: Federation of Bosnia and Herzegovina
- Canton: Herzegovina-Neretva
- Municipality: Neum

Area
  - Total: 3.32 sq mi (8.60 km^{2})

Population (2013)
  - Total: 88
  - Density: 27/sq mi (10/km^{2})
- Time zone: UTC+1 (CET)
  - Summer (DST): UTC+2 (CEST)

Cerovica is a village in the municipality of Neum, Bosnia and Herzegovina.

== Demographics ==
According to the 2013 census, its population was 88, all Croats.
