= Potraš =

- Village
- Location within Bosnia and Herzegovina
- Coordinates: 44.5496497°N 18.8451363°E
- Country: Bosnia and Herzegovina
- Entity: Republika Srpska; Federation of Bosnia and Herzegovina
- Region Canton: Bijeljina; Tuzla
- Municipality: Lopare; Tuzla

Area
  - Total: 1.83 sq mi (4.74 km^{2})

Population (2013)
  - Total: 32
  - Density: 17/sq mi (6.8/km^{2})
- Time zone: UTC+1 (CET)
  - Summer (DST): UTC+2 (CEST)

Potraš is a village in the municipalities of Lopare (Republika Srpska) and Tuzla, Tuzla Canton, Bosnia and Herzegovina.

== Demographics ==
According to the 2013 census, its population was 32, all Serbs living in the Lopare part, with no inhabitants in Tuzla.
