= Ozimica =

- Village
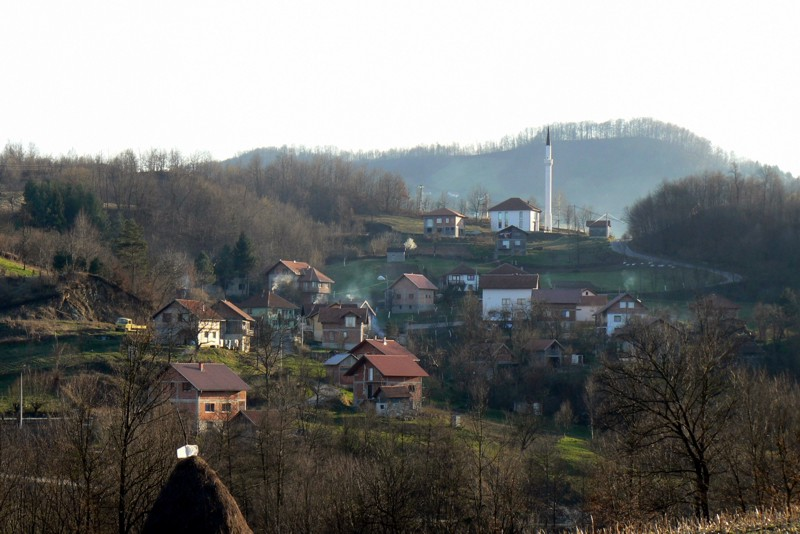

- Location within Bosnia and Herzegovina
- Coordinates: 44.4736199°N 18.0394134°E
- Country: Bosnia and Herzegovina
- Entity: Federation of Bosnia and Herzegovina
- Canton: Zenica-Doboj
- Municipality: Žepče

Area
  - Total: 5.06 sq mi (13.10 km^{2})

Population (2013)
  - Total: 1,431
  - Density: 282.9/sq mi (109.2/km^{2})
- Time zone: UTC+1 (CET)
  - Summer (DST): UTC+2 (CEST)

Ozimica is a village in the municipality of Žepče, Bosnia and Herzegovina.

== Demographics ==
According to the 2013 census, its population was 1,431.

Ethnicity in 2013
Ethnicity	Number	Percentage
Bosniaks	722	50.5%
Croats	692	48.4%
Serbs	3	0.2%
other/undeclared	14	1.0%
Total	1,431	100%
