= Gostilj, Bosnia and Herzegovina =

Gostilj Гостиљ
- Village
- Location within Bosnia and Herzegovina
- Coordinates: 44°18′N 17°30′E
- Country: Bosnia and Herzegovina
- Municipality: Srebrenica
- Time zone: UTC+1 (CET)
  - Summer (DST): UTC+2 (CEST)

Gostilj (Serbian Cyrillic: Гостиљ) is a village in the municipality of Srebrenica, Bosnia and Herzegovina.
