= Ćehići =

- Village
- Location within Bosnia and Herzegovina
- Country: Bosnia and Herzegovina
- Entity: Federation of Bosnia and Herzegovina
- Canton: Una-Sana
- Municipality: Cazin

Area
  - Total: 1.13 sq mi (2.93 km^{2})

Population (2013)
  - Total: 679
  - Density: 600/sq mi (232/km^{2})
- Time zone: UTC+1 (CET)
  - Summer (DST): UTC+2 (CEST)

Ćehići is a village in the municipality of Cazin, Bosnia and Herzegovina.

== Demographics ==
According to the 2013 census, its population was 679.

Ethnicity in 2013
Ethnicity	Number	Percentage
Bosniaks	637	93.8%
other/undeclared	42	6.2%
Total	679	100%
