= Srbljani =

Srbljani Србљани
- Village
- Location within Bosnia and Herzegovina
- Coordinates: 44.900819°N 15.937596°E
- Country: Bosnia and Herzegovina
- Entity: Federation of Bosnia and Herzegovina
- Canton: Una-Sana
- Municipality: Bihać

Area
  - Total: 3.27 sq mi (8.46 km^{2})

Population (2013)
  - Total: 980
  - Density: 300/sq mi (120/km^{2})
- Time zone: UTC+1 (CET)
  - Summer (DST): UTC+2 (CEST)

Srbljani (Serbian Cyrillic: Србљани) is a village in the municipality of Bihać, Bosnia and Herzegovina.

== Demographics ==
According to the 2013 census, its population was 980.

Ethnicity in 2013
Ethnicity	Number	Percentage
Bosniaks	929	94.8%
Croats	7	0.7%
other/undeclared	44	4.5%
Total	980	100%
