= Miljkovići, Mostar =

Village in Bosnia and Herzegovina

Miljkovići
- Village
- Interactive map of Miljkovići
- Location within Bosnia and Herzegovina
- Coordinates: 43.320°N 17.776°E
- Country: Bosnia and Herzegovina
- Entity: Federation of Bosnia and Herzegovina
- Canton: Herzegovina-Neretva
- Municipality: City of Mostar

Area
  - Total: 4.19 sq mi (10.85 km^{2})

Population (2013)
  - Total: 294
  - Density: 70.2/sq mi (27.1/km^{2})
- Time zone: UTC+1 (CET)
  - Summer (DST): UTC+2 (CEST)
- Postal code: 88000 (Same as Mostar)
- Area code: (+387) 36 345

Miljkovići is a populated settlement in the Mostar municipality, Herzegovina-Neretva Canton, Federation of Bosnia and Herzegovina, Bosnia and Herzegovina. It is situated southwest of the city of Mostar.

== Demographics ==
According to the 2013 census, its population was 294.

Ethnicity in 2013
Ethnicity	Number	Percentage
Croats	215	73.1%
Bosniaks	79	26.9%
Total	294	100%
