= Vučkovci =

- Village
- Location within Bosnia and Herzegovina
- Coordinates: 44°48′18″N 18°29′26″E
- Country: Bosnia and Herzegovina
- Entity: Federation of Bosnia and Herzegovina
- Canton: Tuzla
- Municipality: Gradačac

Area
  - Total: 5.59 sq mi (14.49 km^{2})

Population (2013)
  - Total: 2,679
  - Density: 478.9/sq mi (184.9/km^{2})
- Time zone: UTC+1 (CET)
  - Summer (DST): UTC+2 (CEST)

Vučkovci is a village in the municipality of Gradačac, Bosnia and Herzegovina.

== Demographics ==
According to the 2013 census, its population was 2,679.

Ethnicity in 2013
Ethnicity	Number	Percentage
Bosniaks	2,650	98.9%
Serbs	2	0.1%
Croats	1	0.0%
other/undeclared	26	1.0%
Total	2,679	100%
