= Jezerci =

- Village
- Location within Bosnia and Herzegovina
- Coordinates: 44.2704166°N 17.7475029°E
- Country: Bosnia and Herzegovina
- Entity: Federation of Bosnia and Herzegovina
- Canton: Central Bosnia
- Municipality: Travnik

Area
  - Total: 0.85 sq mi (2.19 km^{2})

Population (2013)
  - Total: 338
  - Density: 400/sq mi (154/km^{2})
- Time zone: UTC+1 (CET)
  - Summer (DST): UTC+2 (CEST)

Jezerci is a village in the municipality of Travnik, Bosnia and Herzegovina.

== Demographics ==
According to the 2013 census, its population was 338.

Ethnicity in 2013
Ethnicity	Number	Percentage
Bosniaks	325	96.2%
Croats	11	3.3%
other/undeclared	2	0.6%
Total	338	100%
