= Makljenovac =

- Location within Bosnia and Herzegovina
- Coordinates: 44°42′33″N 18°2′53″E
- Country: Bosnia and Herzegovina
- Entity: Republika Srpska; Federation of Bosnia and Herzegovina
- Region Canton: Doboj; Zenica-Doboj
- Municipality: Doboj; Usora

Area
  - Total: 1.98 sq mi (5.13 km^{2})

Population (2013)
  - Total: 1,571
  - Density: 793/sq mi (306/km^{2})
- Time zone: UTC+1 (CET)
  - Summer (DST): UTC+2 (CEST)

Makljenovac is a village in the municipalities of Doboj (Republika Srpska) and Usora, Bosnia and Herzegovina.

== Demographics ==
According to the 2013 census, its population was 1,571, with 1,210 living in the Doboj part, and 361 living in the Usora part

Ethnicity in 2013
Ethnicity	Number	Percentage
Bosniaks	942	60.0%
Croats	422	26.9%
Serbs	177	11.3%
other/undeclared	30	1.9%
Total	1,571	100%
