= Milankovići =

Village in Olovo, Bosnia and Herzegovina

- Village
- Location within Bosnia and Herzegovina
- Coordinates: 44.2023224°N 18.5381591°E
- Country: Bosnia and Herzegovina
- Entity: Federation of Bosnia and Herzegovina
- Canton: Zenica-Doboj
- Municipality: Olovo

Area
  - Total: 5.31 sq mi (13.75 km^{2})

Population (2013)
  - Total: 299
  - Density: 56.3/sq mi (21.7/km^{2})
- Time zone: UTC+1 (CET)
  - Summer (DST): UTC+2 (CEST)

Milankovići is a village in the municipality of Olovo, Bosnia and Herzegovina.

== Demographics ==
According to the 2013 census, its population was 299.

Ethnicity in 2013
Ethnicity	Number	Percentage
Bosniaks	296	99.0%
other/undeclared	3	1.0%
Total	299	100%
