= Dolac na Lašvi =

- Village
- Location within Bosnia and Herzegovina
- Coordinates: 44.2173902°N 17.6820941°E
- Country: Bosnia and Herzegovina
- Entity: Federation of Bosnia and Herzegovina
- Canton: Central Bosnia
- Municipality: Travnik

Area
  - Total: 0.20 sq mi (0.53 km^{2})

Population (2013)
  - Total: 456
  - Density: 2,200/sq mi (860/km^{2})
- Time zone: UTC+1 (CET)
  - Summer (DST): UTC+2 (CEST)

Dolac na Lašvi is a village in the municipality of Travnik, Bosnia and Herzegovina.

== Demographics ==
According to the 2013 census, its population was 456.

Ethnicity in 2013
Ethnicity	Number	Percentage
Bosniaks	257	56.4%
Croats	178	39.0%
Serbs	4	0.9%
other/undeclared	17	3.7%
Total	456	100%
