= Zelenika, Živinice =

Zelenika
- Village
- Location within Bosnia and Herzegovina
- Coordinates: 44.3991°N 18.7205°E
- Country: Bosnia and Herzegovina
- Entity: Federation of Bosnia and Herzegovina
- Canton: Tuzla
- Municipality: Živinice

Area
  - Total: 1.69 sq mi (4.39 km^{2})

Population (2013)
  - Total: 714
  - Density: 421/sq mi (163/km^{2})
- Time zone: UTC+1 (CET)
  - Summer (DST): UTC+2 (CEST)

Zelenika is a village in the municipality of Živinice, Bosnia and Herzegovina.

== Demographics ==
According to the 2013 census, its population was 714, all Bosniaks.
