= Stari Majdan =

- Village
- Location within Bosnia and Herzegovina
- Coordinates: 44.828572°N 16.597053°E
- Country: Bosnia and Herzegovina
- Entity: Federation of Bosnia and Herzegovina
- Canton: Una-Sana
- Municipality: Sanski Most

Area
  - Total: 5.49 sq mi (14.23 km^{2})

Population (2013)
  - Total: 762
  - Density: 139/sq mi (53.5/km^{2})
- Time zone: UTC+1 (CET)
  - Summer (DST): UTC+2 (CEST)

Stari Majdan is a village in the municipality of Sanski Most, Federation of Bosnia and Herzegovina, Bosnia and Herzegovina.

== Demographics ==
According to the 2013 census, its population was 762.

Ethnicity in 2013
Ethnicity	Number	Percentage
Bosniaks	711	93.3%
Croats	40	5.2%
Serbs	3	0.4%
other/undeclared	8	1.0%
Total	762	100%
