= Grahovo, Velika Kladuša =

Grahovo Грахово
- Village
- Location within Bosnia and Herzegovina
- Coordinates: 45.141279°N 15.844601°E
- Country: Bosnia and Herzegovina
- Entity: Federation of Bosnia and Herzegovina
- Canton: Una-Sana
- Municipality: Velika Kladuša

Area
  - Total: 1.42 sq mi (3.68 km^{2})

Population (2013)
  - Total: 610
  - Density: 430/sq mi (170/km^{2})
- Time zone: UTC+1 (CET)
  - Summer (DST): UTC+2 (CEST)

Grahovo is a village in the municipality of Velika Kladuša, Bosnia and Herzegovina.

== Demographics ==
According to the 2013 census, its population was 610.

Ethnicity in 2013
Ethnicity	Number	Percentage
Bosniaks	518	84.9%
Croats	2	0.3%
other/undeclared	90	14.8%
Total	610	100%
