= Brnjik =

- Village
- Location within Bosnia and Herzegovina
- Coordinates: 44.7352674°N 18.751645°E
- Country: Bosnia and Herzegovina
- Entity: Federation of Bosnia and Herzegovina
- Canton: Tuzla
- Municipality: Čelić

Area
  - Total: 2.92 sq mi (7.56 km^{2})

Population (2013)
  - Total: 461
  - Density: 158/sq mi (61.0/km^{2})
- Time zone: UTC+1 (CET)
  - Summer (DST): UTC+2 (CEST)

Brnjik is a village in the municipality of Čelić, Bosnia and Herzegovina.

== Demographics ==
According to the 2013 census, its population was 461.

Ethnicity in 2013
Ethnicity	Number	Percentage
Bosniaks	454	98.5%
Croats	1	0.2%
Serbs	0	0.0%
other/undeclared	6	1.3%
Total	461	100%
