= Babice Donje =

Babice Donje Бабице Доње
- Village
- Location within Bosnia and Herzegovina
- Coordinates: 44°30′13″N 18°26′36″E
- Country: Bosnia and Herzegovina
- Entity: Federation of Bosnia and Herzegovina
- Canton: Tuzla
- Municipality: Lukavac

Area
  - Total: 1.45 sq mi (3.76 km^{2})

Population (2013)
  - Total: 527
  - Density: 363/sq mi (140/km^{2})

Babice Donje (Cyrillic: Бабице Доње) is a village in the municipality of Lukavac, Bosnia and Herzegovina.

== Demographics ==
According to the 2013 census, its population was 527.

Ethnicity in 2013
Ethnicity	Number	Percentage
Bosniaks	509	96.6%
Croats	1	0.2%
other/undeclared	17	3.2%
Total	527	100%
