= Ratanj =

Village in Kakanj, Bosnia and Herzegovina

Ratanj Ратањ
- Village
- Location within Bosnia and Herzegovina
- Coordinates: 44°09′N 18°13′E
- Country: Bosnia and Herzegovina
- Entity: Federation of Bosnia and Herzegovina
- Canton: Zenica-Doboj
- Municipality: Kakanj

Area
  - Total: 1.22 sq mi (3.16 km^{2})

Population (2013)
  - Total: 17
  - Density: 14/sq mi (5.4/km^{2})
- Time zone: UTC+1 (CET)
  - Summer (DST): UTC+2 (CEST)

Ratanj (Cyrillic: Ратањ) is a village in the municipality of Kakanj, Bosnia and Herzegovina.

== Demographics ==
According to the 2013 census, its population was 17.

Ethnicity in 2013
Ethnicity	Number	Percentage
Croats	14	82.4%
Bosniaks	3	17.6%
Total	17	100%
