= Bukva, Tešanj =

Village in Tešanj, Bosnia and Herzegovina

Bukva
- Location within Bosnia and Herzegovina
- Coordinates: 44.6318313°N 17.9981374°E
- Country: Bosnia and Herzegovina
- Entity: Federation of Bosnia and Herzegovina
- Canton: Zenica-Doboj
- Municipality: Tešanj

Area
  - Total: 0.60 sq mi (1.55 km^{2})

Population (2013)
  - Total: 962
  - Density: 1,610/sq mi (621/km^{2})
- Time zone: UTC+1 (CET)
  - Summer (DST): UTC+2 (CEST)

Bukva is a village in the municipality of Tešanj, Bosnia and Herzegovina.

== Demographics ==
According to the 2013 census, its population was 962.

Ethnicity in 2013
Ethnicity	Number	Percentage
Bosniaks	947	98.4%
Croats	2	0.2%
Serbs	2	0.2%
other/undeclared	11	1.1%
Total	962	100%
