= Morančani =

- Village
- Location within Bosnia and Herzegovina
- Coordinates: 44.4873426°N 18.6052574°E
- Country: Bosnia and Herzegovina
- Entity: Federation of Bosnia and Herzegovina
- Canton: Tuzla
- Municipality: Tuzla

Area
  - Total: 0.49 sq mi (1.28 km^{2})

Population (2013)
  - Total: 266
  - Density: 538/sq mi (208/km^{2})
- Time zone: UTC+1 (CET)
  - Summer (DST): UTC+2 (CEST)

Morančani is a village in the municipality of Tuzla, Tuzla Canton, Bosnia and Herzegovina.

== Demographics ==
According to the 2013 census, its population was 266.

Ethnicity in 2013
Ethnicity	Number	Percentage
Croats	206	77.4%
Bosniaks	21	7.7%
Serbs	5	1.9%
other/undeclared	34	12.8%
Total	266	100%
