= Gromiljak =

- Village
- Location within Bosnia and Herzegovina
- Coordinates: 43°58′N 18°03′E
- Country: Bosnia and Herzegovina
- Entity: Federation of Bosnia and Herzegovina
- Canton: Central Bosnia
- Municipality: Kiseljak

Area
  - Total: 0.94 sq mi (2.43 km^{2})

Population (2013)
  - Total: 786
  - Density: 838/sq mi (323/km^{2})
- Time zone: UTC+1 (CET)
  - Summer (DST): UTC+2 (CEST)

Gromiljak is a village in the municipality of Kiseljak, Bosnia and Herzegovina.

== Demographics ==
According to the 2013 census, its population was 786.

Ethnicity in 2013
Ethnicity	Number	Percentage
Croats	688	87.5%
Bosniaks	81	10.3%
Serbs	5	0.6%
other/undeclared	12	1.5%
Total	786	100%
