= Dubrave Donje =

- Village
- Location within Bosnia and Herzegovina
- Coordinates: 44.4778°N 18.6670°E
- Country: Bosnia and Herzegovina
- Entity: Federation of Bosnia and Herzegovina
- Canton: Tuzla
- Municipality: Živinice

Area
  - Total: 4.59 sq mi (11.88 km^{2})

Population (2013)
  - Total: 2,224
  - Density: 484.9/sq mi (187.2/km^{2})
- Time zone: UTC+1 (CET)
  - Summer (DST): UTC+2 (CEST)

Dubrave Donje is a village in the municipality of Živinice, Bosnia and Herzegovina.

== Demographics ==
According to the 2013 census, its population was 2,224.

Ethnicity in 2013
Ethnicity	Number	Percentage
Bosniaks	1,977	88.9%
Croats	194	8.7%
Serbs	4	0.2%
other/undeclared	49	2.2%
Total	2,224	100%
