= Konjikovići =

- Village
- Location within Bosnia and Herzegovina
- Coordinates: 44.5871966°N 18.7880587°E
- Country: Bosnia and Herzegovina
- Entity: Republika Srpska; Federation of Bosnia and Herzegovina
- Region Canton: Bijeljina; Tuzla
- Municipality: Lopare; Tuzla

Area
  - Total: 1.34 sq mi (3.47 km^{2})

Population (2013)
  - Total: 42
  - Density: 31/sq mi (12/km^{2})
- Time zone: UTC+1 (CET)
  - Summer (DST): UTC+2 (CEST)

Konjikovići is a village in the municipalities of Lopare (Republika Srpska) and Tuzla, Tuzla Canton, Bosnia and Herzegovina.

== Demographics ==
According to the 2013 census, its population was 42, all Serbs, with 40 living in the Lopare part and 2 in Tuzla.
