= Donje Ravno =

Donje Ravno Доње Равно
- Village
- Location within Bosnia and Herzegovina
- Coordinates: 43°51′N 17°21′E
- Country: Bosnia and Herzegovina
- Entity: Federation of Bosnia and Herzegovina
- Canton: Canton 10
- Municipality: Kupres

Area
  - Total: 8.74 km^{2} (3.37 sq mi)

Population (2013)
  - Total: 73
  - Density: 8.4/km^{2} (22/sq mi)
- Time zone: UTC+1 (CET)
  - Summer (DST): UTC+2 (CEST)

Donje Ravno (Serbian: Доње Равно) is a village in the Municipality of Kupres in Canton 10 of the Federation of Bosnia and Herzegovina, an entity of Bosnia and Herzegovina.

== Demographics ==
According to the 2013 census, its population was 73.

Ethnicity in 2013
Ethnicity	Number	Percentage
Serbs	43	58.9%
Bosniaks	30	41.1%
Total	73	100%

== Bibliography ==
- Ethnicity/National Affiliation, Religion and Mother Tongue (PDF). Sarajevo: Agency for Statistics of Bosnia and Herzegovina. 2019.
