= Bare (Jajce) =

- Village
- Location within Bosnia and Herzegovina
- Country: Bosnia and Herzegovina
- Entity: Federation of Bosnia and Herzegovina
- Canton: Central Bosnia
- Municipality: Jajce

Area
  - Total: 0.54 sq mi (1.41 km^{2})

Population (2013)
  - Total: 252
  - Density: 463/sq mi (179/km^{2})
- Time zone: UTC+1 (CET)
  - Summer (DST): UTC+2 (CEST)

Bare is a village in the municipality of Jajce, Bosnia and Herzegovina.

== Demographics ==
According to the 2013 census, its population was 252.

Ethnicity in 2013
Ethnicity	Number	Percentage
Croats	251	99.6%
other/undeclared	1	0.4%
Total	252	100%
