= Prolog, Livno =

Prolog
- Village
- Location within Bosnia and Herzegovina
- Coordinates: 43°48′N 16°50′E
- Country: Bosnia and Herzegovina
- Entity: Federation of Bosnia and Herzegovina
- Canton: Canton 10
- Township: Livno

Area
  - Total: 50.71 km^{2} (19.58 sq mi)

Population (2013)
  - Total: 861
  - Density: 17.0/km^{2} (44.0/sq mi)
- Time zone: UTC+1 (CET)
  - Summer (DST): UTC+2 (CEST)

Prolog is a village in the Township of Livno in Canton 10 of the Federation of Bosnia and Herzegovina, an entity of Bosnia and Herzegovina.

== Demographics ==
According to the 2013 census, its population was 861.

Ethnicity in 2013
Ethnicity	Number	Percentage
Croats	856	99.54%
Serbs	3	0.3%
other/undeclared	2	0.2%
Total	861	100%

== Bibliography ==
- Ethnicity/National Affiliation, Religion and Mother Tongue (PDF). Sarajevo: Agency for Statistics of Bosnia and Herzegovina. 2019.
