= Podgorje, Mostar =

Podgorje
- Village
- Location within Bosnia and Herzegovina
- Coordinates: 43°17′37″N 17°44′13″E
- Country: Bosnia and Herzegovina
- Entity: Federation of Bosnia and Herzegovina
- Canton: Herzegovina-Neretva
- Municipality: City of Mostar

Area
  - Total: 1.58 sq mi (4.08 km^{2})

Population (2013)
  - Total: 181
  - Density: 115/sq mi (44.4/km^{2})
- Time zone: UTC+1 (CET)
  - Summer (DST): UTC+2 (CEST)
- Postal code: 88000 (Same as Mostar)
- Area code: (+387) 36 345

Podgorje is a village in the City of Mostar, Bosnia and Herzegovina.

== Demographics ==
According to the 2013 census, its population was 181.

Ethnicity in 2013
Ethnicity	Number	Percentage
Croats	180	99.4%
Serbs	1	0.6%
Total	181	100%
