= Vrhpolje, Sanski Most =

Vrhpolje
- Village
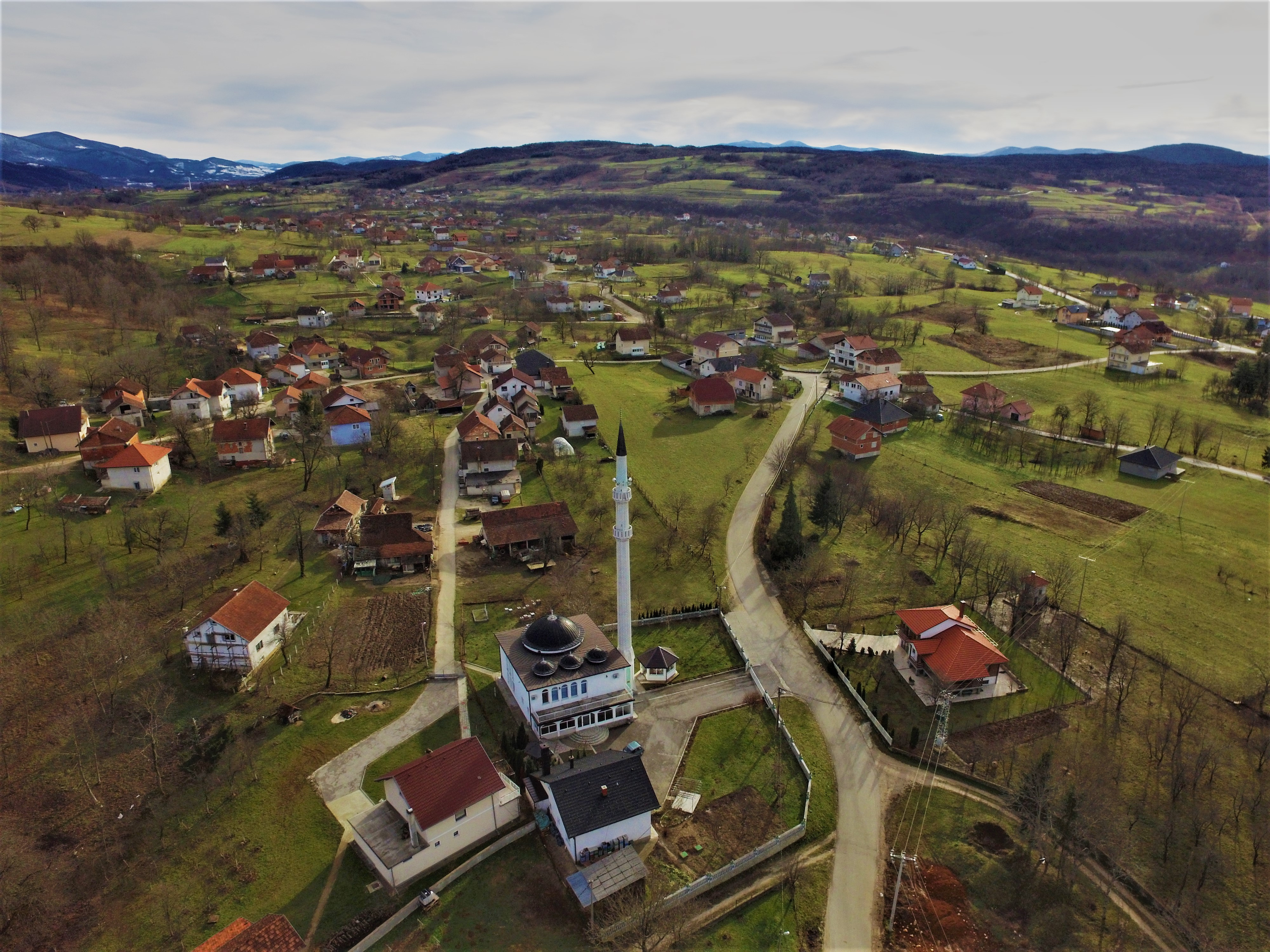

- Location within Bosnia and Herzegovina
- Coordinates: 44.666391°N 16.737662°E
- Country: Bosnia and Herzegovina
- Entity: Federation of Bosnia and Herzegovina
- Canton: Una-Sana
- Municipality: Sanski Most

Area
  - Total: 4.82 sq mi (12.48 km^{2})

Population (2013)
  - Total: 2,035
  - Density: 422.3/sq mi (163.1/km^{2})
- Time zone: UTC+1 (CET)
  - Summer (DST): UTC+2 (CEST)

Vrhpolje is a village in the municipality of Sanski Most, Federation of Bosnia and Herzegovina, Bosnia and Herzegovina.

== Demographics ==
According to the 2013 census, its population was 2,035.

Ethnicity in 2013
Ethnicity	Number	Percentage
Bosniaks	2,027	99.6%
other/undeclared	8	0.4%
Total	2,035	100%
