= Bejići =

- Village
- Location within Bosnia and Herzegovina
- Coordinates: 44.7019526°N 17.9703659°E
- Country: Bosnia and Herzegovina
- Entity: Federation of Bosnia and Herzegovina
- Canton: Zenica-Doboj
- Municipality: Usora

Area
  - Total: 1.26 sq mi (3.26 km^{2})

Population (2013)
  - Total: 233
  - Density: 185/sq mi (71.5/km^{2})
- Time zone: UTC+1 (CET)
  - Summer (DST): UTC+2 (CEST)

Bejići is a village in the municipality of Usora, Bosnia and Herzegovina.

== Demographics ==
According to the 2013 census, its population was 233.

Ethnicity in 2013
Ethnicity	Number	Percentage
Croats	226	97.0%
Serbs	6	2.6%
other/undeclared	1	0.4%
Total	233	100%
