= Lušci Palanka =

- Village
- Location within Bosnia and Herzegovina
- Coordinates: 44.744182°N 16.421563°E
- Country: Bosnia and Herzegovina
- Entity: Federation of Bosnia and Herzegovina
- Canton: Una-Sana
- Municipality: Sanski Most

Area
  - Total: 2.19 sq mi (5.68 km^{2})

Population (2013)
  - Total: 226
  - Density: 103/sq mi (39.8/km^{2})
- Time zone: UTC+1 (CET)
  - Summer (DST): UTC+2 (CEST)

Lušci Palanka is a village in the municipality of Sanski Most, Federation of Bosnia and Herzegovina, Bosnia and Herzegovina.

== Demographics ==
According to the 2013 census, its population was 226.

Ethnicity in 2013
Ethnicity	Number	Percentage
Serbs	216	95.6%
Bosniaks	3	1.3%
Croats	2	0.9%
other/undeclared	5	2.2%
Total	226	100%
