= Lašva, Zenica =

Lašva
- Village
- Location within Bosnia and Herzegovina
- Coordinates: 44.1248909°N 17.9410326°E
- Country: Bosnia and Herzegovina
- Entity: Federation of Bosnia and Herzegovina
- Canton: Zenica-Doboj
- Municipality: Zenica

Area
  - Total: 1.56 sq mi (4.04 km^{2})

Population (2013)
  - Total: 438
  - Density: 281/sq mi (108/km^{2})
- Time zone: UTC+1 (CET)
  - Summer (DST): UTC+2 (CEST)

Lašva is a village in the City of Zenica, Bosnia and Herzegovina. It is located at the draining of the Lašva into the Bosna river.

== Demographics ==
According to the 2013 census, its population was 438.

Ethnicity in 2013
Ethnicity	Number	Percentage
Bosniaks	425	97.0%
Croats	1	0.2%
Serbs	3	0.7%
other/undeclared	9	2.1%
Total	438	100%
