= Velagići =

- Village
- Location within Bosnia and Herzegovina
- Country: Bosnia and Herzegovina
- Entity: Federation of Bosnia and Herzegovina
- Canton: Una-Sana
- Municipality: Ključ

Area
  - Total: 1.07 sq mi (2.78 km^{2})

Population (2013)
  - Total: 465
  - Density: 433/sq mi (167/km^{2})
- Time zone: UTC+1 (CET)
  - Summer (DST): UTC+2 (CEST)

Velagići is a village in the municipality of Ključ, Bosnia and Herzegovina. As of 2013, the village had a population of 573.

== Demographics ==
According to the 2013 census, its population was 465.

Ethnicity in 2013
Ethnicity	Number	Percentage
Bosniaks	459	98.7%
Serbs	4	0.9%
Croats	1	0.2%
other/undeclared	1	0.2%
Total	465	100%
