= Sebešić =

- Village
- Location within Bosnia and Herzegovina
- Coordinates: 44.0206809°N 17.7126924°E
- Country: Bosnia and Herzegovina
- Entity: Federation of Bosnia and Herzegovina
- Canton: Central Bosnia
- Municipality: Novi Travnik

Area
  - Total: 18.85 sq mi (48.82 km^{2})

Population (2013)
  - Total: 50
  - Density: 2.7/sq mi (1.0/km^{2})
- Time zone: UTC+1 (CET)
  - Summer (DST): UTC+2 (CEST)

Sebešić is a village in the municipality of Novi Travnik, Bosnia and Herzegovina.

== Demographics ==
According to the 2013 census, its population was 50.

Ethnicity in 2013
Ethnicity	Number	Percentage
Croats	49	98.0%
Serbs	1	2.0%
Total	50	100%
