= Turalići, Kladanj =

Turalići
- Village
- Location within Bosnia and Herzegovina
- Coordinates: 44.2120142°N 18.8179021°E
- Country: Bosnia and Herzegovina
- Entity: Republika Srpska; Federation of Bosnia and Herzegovina
- Region Canton: Bijeljina; Tuzla
- Municipality: Vlasenica; Kladanj

Area
  - Total: 5.01 sq mi (12.97 km^{2})

Population (2013)
  - Total: 334
  - Density: 66.7/sq mi (25.8/km^{2})

Turalići is a village in the municipalities of Vlasenica (Republika Srpska) and Kladanj, Bosnia and Herzegovina.

== Demographics ==
According to the 2013 census, its population was 334.

Ethnicity in 2013
Ethnicity	Number	Percentage
Bosniaks	316	94.6%
Serbs	18	5.4%
Total	334	100%
