= Knešpolje, Široki Brijeg =

Knešpolje Кнешпоље
- Village
- Location within Bosnia and Herzegovina
- Coordinates: 43°22′10″N 17°37′58″E
- Country: Bosnia and Herzegovina
- Entity: Federation of Bosnia and Herzegovina
- Canton: West Herzegovina
- Municipality: Široki Brijeg

Area
  - Total: 3.26 sq mi (8.45 km^{2})

Population (2013)
  - Total: 1,322
  - Density: 405/sq mi (156/km^{2})
- Time zone: UTC+1 (CET)
  - Summer (DST): UTC+2 (CEST)

Knešpolje is a settlement within the municipality of Široki Brijeg, Bosnia and Herzegovina. In 1991, the settlement had a population of 1,110. It is located along the Mostar-Široki Brijeg roadway.

== History ==
Knešpolje was first linked to Mostar by road in 1896 under what was then Austro-Hungarian rule. Knešpolje is the site of two World War II mass graves. The exhumation of these remains is set to begin in 2010.

== Culture ==
The village is home to the Church of St. John the Baptist (Crkva sv. Ivana Krstitelja).

== Population ==
Knešpolje
Year	1991.	1981.	1971.
Croats	1,105 (99.54%)	975 (99.69%)	951 (100%)
Yugoslavs	3 (0.27%)	0	0
Others and Unknown	2 (0.18%)	3 (0.30%)	0
Total	1,110	978	951

According to the 2013 census, its population was 1,322.

Ethnicity in 2013
Ethnicity	Number	Percentage
Croats	1,312	99.2%
Serbs	1	0.1%
other/undeclared	9	0.7%
Total	1,322	100%
