= Kaonik =

- Village
- Location within Bosnia and Herzegovina
- Coordinates: 44°08′N 17°53′E
- Country: Bosnia and Herzegovina
- Entity: Federation of Bosnia and Herzegovina
- Canton: Central Bosnia
- Municipality: Busovača

Area
  - Total: 0.48 sq mi (1.24 km^{2})

Population (2013)
  - Total: 380
  - Density: 790/sq mi (310/km^{2})
- Time zone: UTC+1 (CET)
  - Summer (DST): UTC+2 (CEST)

Kaonik is a village in the municipality of Busovača, Bosnia and Herzegovina.

== Demographics ==
According to the 2013 census, its population was 380.

Ethnicity in 2013
Ethnicity	Number	Percentage
Croats	272	71.6%
Bosniaks	89	23.4%
Serbs	8	2.1%
other/undeclared	11	2.9%
Total	380	100%
