= Postal codes in Bosnia and Herzegovina =

Postal codes in Bosnia and Herzegovina consist of five digits.

Following the independence, the country continued to use the 5-digit numeric postal codes once assigned to the Socialist Republic of Bosnia and Herzegovina (within SFR Yugoslavia), with small adaptations to new administrative structures. The system had assigned the ranges 7xxxx and 8xxxx to the republic.

There are three companies responsible for postal service in Bosnia and Herzegovina:

- BH Pošta
- HP Mostar
- Pošte Srpske

== A ==
- 78255 – Aleksandrovac (Laktaši), Pošte Srpske
- 89245 – Avtovac, Pošte Srpske

== B ==
- 72286 – Babanovac, BH Pošta
- 75290 – Banovići, BH Pošta
- 78000 – Banja Luka, Pošte Srpske
- 78103 – Banja Luka, Pošte Srpske
- 78108 – Banja Luka, Pošte Srpske
- 78114 – Banja Luka, Pošte Srpske
- 70267 – Baraći, Pošte Srpske
- 76312 – Batković, Pošte Srpske
- 72233 – Begov Han, BH Pošta
- 88363 – Berkovići, Pošte Srpske
- 77000 – Bihać, BH Pošta
- 76204 – Bijela, HP Mostar
- 73263 – Bijelo Brdo, Pošte Srpske
- 76300 – Bijeljina, Pošte Srpske
- 72256 – Bila (Vitez), HP Mostar
- 88268 – Biletić Polje, HP Mostar
- 71253 – Bilalovac, BH Pošta
- 89230 – Bileća, Pošte Srpske
- 72248 – Bilješevo, BH Pošta
- 88407 – Bjelimići, BH Pošta
- 88201 – Blagaj, BH Pošta
- 74275 – Blatnica (Teslić), Pošte Srpske
- 88263 – Blatnica, Čitluk, HP Mostar
- 71215 – Blažuj, BH Pošta
- 76210 – Boće, HP Mostar
- 76277 – Bok, HP Mostar
- 74322 – Boljanić, Pošte Srpske
- 88405 – Boračko jezero, BH Pošta
- 88365 – Borojevići, HP Mostar – Temporarily closed
- 73225 – Borike, Pošte Srpske
- 77240 – Bosanska Krupa, BH Pošta
- 77250 – Bosanski Petrovac, BH Pošta
- 80270 – Bosansko Grahovo, HP Mostar
- 75420 – Bratunac, Pošte Srpske
- 76100 – Brčko, Pošte Srpske
- 76120 – Brčko, BH Pošta
- 76101 – Brčko, Pošte Srpske
- 77205 – Brekovica, BH Pošta
- 74210 – Brestovo, Pošte Srpske
- 71255 – Brestovsko, HP Mostar
- 71370 – Breza, BH Pošta
- 79208 – Brezičani (Prijedor), Pošte Srpske
- 76216 – Brezovo Polje, Pošte Srpske
- 74206 – Brijesnica, BH Pošta
- 76206 – Brka, BH Pošta
- 72243 – Brnjic, BH Pošta
- 88243 – Broćanac, HP Mostar
- 73309 – Brod, Pošte Srpske
- 74450 – Brod, Pošte Srpske
- 76313 – Brodac Donji / Brodac Gornji, Pošte Srpske
- 78204 – Bronzani Majdan, Pošte Srpske
- 70230 – Bugojno, BH Pošta
- 75203 – Bukinje, BH Pošta
- 74277 – Buletić, Pošte Srpske - Closed
- 72293 – Bučići, HP Mostar – Temporarily closed
- 88202 – Buna, HP Mostar
- 72260 – Busovača, HP Mostar
- 88366 – Burmazi, HP Mostar – Temporarily closed
- 88409 – Buturović Polje, BH Pošta
- 77245 – Bužim, BH Pošta

== C ==
- 75405 – Caparde, Pošte Srpske
- 71347 – Careva Ćuprija, BH Pošta
- 77220 – Cazin, BH Pošta
- 76239 – Crkvina, Pošte Srpske
- 88367 – Crnići, HP Mostar
- 76328 – Crnjelovo Donje / Crnjelovo Gornje, Pošte Srpske

== Č ==
- 73280 – Čajniče, Pošte Srpske
- 88300 – Čapljina, HP Mostar
- 88302 – Čapljina-Euroherc, HP Mostar
- 72224 – Čardak, BH Pošta
- 72246 – Čatići, BH Pošta
- 74274 – Čečava, Pošte Srpske
- 73307 – Čelebići, Pošte Srpske
- 88404 – Čelebići, BH Pošta
- 75246 – Čelić, BH Pošta
- 78240 – Čelinac, Pošte Srpske
- 88265 – Čerin, HP Mostar
- 88260 – Čitluk, HP Mostar
- 88261 – Čitluk-Euroherc, HP Mostar

== Ć ==
- 77226 – Ćoralići, BH Pošta
- 78427 – Ćukali, Pošte Srpske

== D ==
- 71223 – Delijaš, BH Pošta
- 79243 – Demirovac, Pošte Srpske
- 74400 – Derventa, Pošte Srpske
- 75444 – Derventa, Pošte Srpske
- 70204 – Divičani, HP Mostar
- 89233 – Divin, Pošte Srpske
- 74101 – Doboj, Pošte Srpske
- 75328 – Doborovci, BH Pošta
- 70210 – Dobretići, HP Mostar
- 79223 – Dobrljin, Pošte Srpske
- 73247 – Dobrun, Pošte Srpske
- 72278 – Dolac na Lašvi, BH Pošta
- 88446 – Doljani, HP Mostar
- 76233 – Domaljevac, HP Mostar
- 76231 – Domaljevac-Granični, HP Mostar
- 88305 – Domanovići, HP Mostar
- 76274 – Donja Mahala, HP Mostar
- 76257 – Donja Međiđa, BH Pošta
- 76237 – Donja Slatina, Pošte Srpske
- 71305 – Donje Moštre, BH Pošta
- 79228 – Donji Agići, Pošte Srpske
- 79266 – Donji Kamengrad, BH Pošta
- 88343 – Donji Mamići, HP Mostar
- 76297 – Donji Svilaj, HP Mostar
- 70220 – Donji Vakuf, BH Pošta
- 78432 – Donji Vijačani, Pošte Srpske
- 79289 – Donji Vrbljani, Pošte Srpske
- 76273 – Donji Žabar, Pošte Srpske
- 74209 – Dragalovci, Pošte Srpske
- 76323 – Dragaljevac, Pošte Srpske
- 78215 – Dragočaj, Pošte Srpske
- 88215 – Drežnica (Donja Drežnica, Gornja Drežnica), BH Pošta
- 79290 – Drinić, Pošte Srpske
- 88344 – Drinovci, HP Mostar
- 75410 – Drinjača (Zvornik), Pošte Srpske
- 80260 – Drvar, HP Mostar
- 70237 – Drvetine, BH Pošta
- 75358 – Duboki Potok, BH Pošta
- 75308 – Duboštica, BH Pošta
- 79227 – Dubovik (Donji Dubovik, Mali Dubovik), Pošte Srpske
- 78243 – Dubrava Stara, Pošte Srpske
- 78411 – Dubrave, Pošte Srpske
- 75274 – Dubrave Donje, BH Pošta
- 75273 – Dubrave Gornje, BH Pošta
- 74483 – Dugo Polje, Pošte Srpske
- 88342 – Dužice, HP Mostar
- 76311 – Dvorovi, Pošte Srpske

== Đ ==
- 75272 – Đurđevik, BH Pošta

== F ==
- 79264 – Fajtovci, BH Pošta
- 75423 – Fakovići, Pošte Srpske
- 73302 – Foča , Pošte Srpske
- 71270 – Fojnica, BH Pošta
- 89247 – Fojnica, Pošte Srpske

== G ==
- 88306 – Gabela, HP Mostar – Temporarily closed
- 89240 – Gacko, Pošte Srpske
- 74484 – Garevac, Pošte Srpske
- 80230 – Glamoč, HP Mostar
- 88406 – Glavatičevo,BH Pošta
- 76318 – Glavičice, Pošte Srpske
- 74258 – Globarica, HP Mostar
- 88422 – Glogošnica, BH Pošta
- 88392 – Gradac, HP Mostar – Temporarily closed
- 71275 – Gojevići, HP Mostar
- 78203 – Goleši, Pošte Srpske
- 73101 – Goražde, BH Pošta
- 76296 – Gornja Dubica, HP Mostar
- 77222 – Gornja Koprivna, BH Pošta
- 76238 – Gornja Slatina, Pošte Srpske
- 75208 – Gornja Tuzla, BH Pošta
- 78405 – Gornji Podgradci, Pošte Srpske
- 76207 – Gornji Rahić, BH Pošta
- 79288 – Gornji Ribnik, Pošte Srpske
- 78438 – Gornji Smrtići, Pošte Srpske
- 78439 – Gornji Štrpci, Pošte Srpske
- 74272 – Gornji Teslić, Pošte Srpske
- 70240 – Gornji Vakuf, BH Pošta
- 76214 – Gornji Zovik, HP Mostar
- 89201 – Grab, Pošte Srpske
- 74219 – Grabovica, Pošte Srpske
- 78227 – Grabovica, Pošte Srpske
- 88443 – Gračac, Prozor, HP Mostar
- 75320 – Gračanica, BH Pošta
- 70233 – Gračanica, Bugojno, BH Pošta
- 75276 – Gračanica, Živinice, BH Pošta
- 76250 – Gradačac, BH Pošta
- 78400 – Gradiška, Pošte Srpske
- 76234 – Grebnice, HP Mostar – Temporarily closed
- 88340 – Grude, HP Mostar
- 88341 – Grude-MUP, HP Mostar
- 80205 – Guber, HP Mostar – Temporarily closed
- 72277 – Guča Gora, BH Pošta
- 75404 – Gušteri (Zvornik), Pošte Srpske

== H ==
- 71240 – Hadžići, BH Pošta
- 72225 – Hajderovići, BH Pošta
- 72245 – Haljinići, BH Pošta
- 72281 – Han Bila, BH Pošta
- 71360 – Han Pijesak, Pošte Srpske
- 88368 – Hodovo, HP Mostar - Temporarily closed
- 88395 – Hrasno, HP Mostar - Temporarily closed
- 71144 – Hreša, Pošte Srpske
- 78436 – Hrvaćani (Prnjavor), Pošte Srpske
- 75216 – Husino, BH Pošta
- 88394 – Hutovo, HP Mostar,

== I ==
- 71210 – Ilidža, BH Pošta
- 71380 – Ilijaš, BH Pošta
- 73208 – Ilovača, BH Pošta
- 78234 – Imljani, Pošte Srpske
- 71123 – Istočno Sarajevo, Pošte Srpske
- 77208 – Izačić, BH Pošta

== J ==
- 88420 – Jablanica, BH Pošta
- 70101 – Jajce, HP Mostar,
- 76316 – Janja, Pošte Srpske
- 72215 – Janjići, BH Pošta
- 88224 – Jare, HP Mostar,
- 78233 – Javorani, Pošte Srpske
- 74264 – Jelah, BH Pošta
- 70206 – Jezero, Pošte Srpske
- 77241 – Jezerski, BH Pošta
- 79244 – Johova, Pošte Srpske
- 78244 – Jošavka, Pošte Srpske

== K ==
- 72264 – Kaćuni, BH Pošta
- 72240 – Kakanj, BH Pošta
- 74413 – Kalenderovci, Pošte Srpske
- 75260 – Kalesija, BH Pošta
- 71230 – Kalinovik, Pošte Srpske
- 71355 – Kaljina, Pošte Srpske
- 77204 – Kamenica, BH Pošta
- 72265 – Kaonik, BH Pošta
- 70235 – Karadže, BH Pošta
- 72284 – Karaula, BH Pošta
- 71213 – Kasindo, Pošte Srpske
- 80246 – Kazaginac, HP Mostar – Temporarily closed
- 88283 – Kifino Selo, Pošte Srpske
- 71250 – Kiseljak, HP Mostar,
- 75211 – Kiseljak, BH Pošta
- 75280 – Kladanj, BH Pošta
- 88324 – Klobuk (Ljubuški), HP Mostar,
- 74207 – Klokotnica, BH Pošta
- 79280 – Ključ, BH Pošta
- 78230 – Kneževo, Pošte Srpske
- 79246 – Knežica, Pošte Srpske
- 71356 – Knežina, Pošte Srpske
- 78423 – Kobaš, Pošte Srpske
- 88226 – Kočerin, HP Mostar,
- 80244 – Kongora, HP Mostar
- 76276 – Kostrč, HP Mostar
- 78207 – Kola, Pošte Srpske
- 88400 – Konjic, BH Pošta
- 77249 – Konjodor, BH Pošta
- 74489 – Koprivna, Pošte Srpske
- 75247 – Koraj, Pošte Srpske
- 76236 – Kornica, Pošte Srpske
- 74253 – Kosova, BH Pošta
- 74222 – Kostajnica (Doboj), Pošte Srpske
- 79224 – Kostajnica, Pošte Srpske
- 78220 – Kotor Varoš, Pošte Srpske
- 74215 – Kotorsko, Pošte Srpske
- 72226 – Kovači (Zavidovići), BH Pošta
- 79202 – Kozarac, Pošte Srpske
- 79240 – Kozarska Dubica, Pošte Srpske
- 75413 – Kozluk, Pošte Srpske
- 72244 – Kraljeva Sutjeska, BH Pošta
- 79284 – Krasulje, BH Pošta
- 76212 – Krepšić, Pošte Srpske
- 71260 – Kreševo, HP Mostar
- 78256 – Kriškovci, Pošte Srpske
- 77253 – Krnjeuša, BH Pošta
- 78206 – Krupa na Vrbasu, Pošte Srpske
- 88203 – Kruševo, Stolac, HP Mostar
- 78424 – Kukulje, Pošte Srpske
- 78443 – Kulaši, Pošte Srpske
- 77206 – Kulen Vakuf, BH Pošta
- 78212 – Kuljani, Pošte Srpske
- 80320 – Kupres, HP Mostar

== L ==
- 78250 – Laktaši, Pošte Srpske
- 78407 – Laminci Sređani, Pošte Srpske
- 79204 – Lamovita, Pošte Srpske
- 89208 – Lastva, Pošte Srpske
- 71254 – Lepenica (Kiseljak), HP Mostar
- 75213 – Lipnica, BH Pošta
- 80101 – Livno, HP Mostar
- 80204 – Lištani, HP Mostar
- 76278 – Lončari, Pošte Srpske
- 75240 – Lopare, Pošte Srpske
- 75300 – Lukavac, BH Pošta
- 75327 – Lukavica, BH Pošta
- 80203 – Lusnić, HP Mostar – Temporarily closed
- 79267 – Lušci Palanka, BH Pošta

== Lj ==
- 75214 – Ljubače, BH Pošta
- 79206 – Ljubija, Pošte Srpske
- 88380 – Ljubinje, Pošte Srpske
- 89209 – Ljubomir, Pošte Srpske
- 88320 – Ljubuški, HP Mostar
- 88321 – Ljubuški-Euroherc, HP Mostar
- 88322 – Ljubuški-Općina, HP Mostar
- 88223 – Ljuti Dolac, HP Mostar

== M ==
- 74250 – Maglaj, BH Pošta
- 74216 – Majevac, Pošte Srpske
- 77235 – Mala Kladuša, BH Pošta
- 74418 – Mala Sočanica, Pošte Srpske
- 75326 – Malešići, BH Pošta
- 76208 – Maoča, BH Pošta
- 78223 – Maslovare, Pošte Srpske
- 78410 – Mašići, Pošte Srpske
- 76271 – Matići, HP Mostar
- 74203 – Matuzići, BH Pošta
- 88266 – Međugorje, HP Mostar
- 88267 – Međugorje, HP Mostar
- 88264 – Međugorje-kiosk, HP Mostar
- 79247 – Međuvođe, Pošte Srpske
- 72282 – Mehurići, BH Pošta
- 80243 – Mesihovina, HP Mostar
- 75446 – Milići, Pošte Srpske
- 74485 – Miloševac, Pošte Srpske
- 73283 – Miljeno, Pošte Srpske
- 73313 – Miljevina, Pošte Srpske
- 75329 – Miričina, BH Pošta
- 74480 – Modriča, Pošte Srpske
- 71428 – Mokro, Pošte Srpske
- 89204 – Mosko, Pošte Srpske
- 88000 – Mostar, HP Mostar
- 88101 – Mostar, HP Mostar
- 88103 – Mostar, BH Pošta
- 88104 – Mostar-Mehanizacija, BH Pošta
- 88105 – Mostar-Avenija, HP Mostar
- 88107 – Mostar-Balinovac, HP Mostar
- 88108 – Mostar-Cernica, BH Pošta
- 88109 – Mostar-Cim, HP Mostar
- 88110 – Mostar, BH Pošta
- 88123 – Mostar-CIPS – Temporarily closed
- 88122 – Mostar-Euroherc, HP Mostar
- 88005 – Mostar-Glavni telegraf, HP Mostar
- 88106 – Mostar-Rodoč, HP Mostar
- 88121 – Mostar-MUP, HP Mostar
- 75212 – Mramor, BH Pošta
- 73206 – Mravinjac, BH Pošta
- 70260 – Mrkonjić Grad, Pošte Srpske

== N ==
- 78434 – Naseobina Lišnja, Pošte Srpske
- 72212 – Nemila, BH Pošta
- 88390 – Neum, HP Mostar
- 88280 – Nevesinje, Pošte Srpske
- 71383 – Nišići, BH Pošta
- 72276 – Nova Bila, HP Mostar
- 75445 – Nova Kasaba, Pošte Srpske
- 78418 – Nova Topola, Pošte Srpske
- 79220 – Novi Grad (Bosanski Novi), Pošte Srpske
- 74254 – Novi Šeher, BH Pošta / HP Mostar
- 72290 – Novi Travnik, BH Pošta / HP Mostar
- 73110 – Novo Goražde, Pošte Srpske
- 78428 – Nožičko, Pošte Srpske

== O ==
- 70225 – Oborci, BH Pošta
- 76235 – Obudovac, Pošte Srpske
- 76290 – Odžak, HP Mostar
- 88285 – Odžak, Pošte Srpske
- 71340 – Olovo, BH Pošta
- 79203 – Omarska, Pošte Srpske
- 79293 – Opara, BH Pošta
- 78406 – Orahova, Pošte Srpske
- 75323 – Orahovica Donja, BH Pošta
- 76270 – Orašje, HP Mostar
- 76281 – Orašje-Granični, HP Mostar
- 80206 – Orguz, HP Mostar
- 74412 – Osinja, Pošte Srpske
- 74225 – Osječani, Pošte Srpske
- 75406 – Osmaci, Pošte Srpske
- 88423 – Ostrožac, BH Pošta
- 77228 – Ostrožac, BH Pošta
- 76279 – Oštra Luka, HP Mostar
- 79263 – Oštra Luka, Pošte Srpske
- 77244 – Otoka, BH Pošta
- 72238 – Ozimica, HP Mostar

== P ==
- 70243 – Pajić Polje, BH Pošta
- 74255 – Paklenica, Pošte Srpske
- 71420 – Pale, Pošte Srpske
- 75453 – Papraća, Pošte Srpske
- 76315 – Patkovača, Pošte Srpske
- 71243 – Pazarić, BH Pošta
- 77227 – Pećigrad, BH Pošta
- 76256 – Pelagićevo, Pošte Srpske
- 74317 – Petrovo, Pošte Srpske
- 75412 – Pilica (Donja Pilica, Gornja Pilica), Pošte Srpske
- 75248 – Piperi, Pošte Srpske
- 78217 – Piskavica), Pošte Srpske
- 70275 – Pljeva, Pošte Srpske
- 72252 – Počulica, BH Pošta
- 71425 – Podgrab, Pošte Srpske
- 80209 – Podhum, HP Mostar
- 71387 – Podlugovi, BH Pošta
- 74217 – Podnovlje, Pošte Srpske
- 88403 – Podorašac, BH Pošta
- 75355 – Podorašje, BH Pošta
- 70266 – Podrašnica, Pošte Srpske
- 88206 – Podvelež, BH Pošta
- 77232 – Podzvizd, BH Pošta
- 77209 – Pokoj, BH Pošta
- 75303 – Poljice, BH Pošta
- 88240 – Posušje, HP Mostar
- 88241 – Posušje-Inđilović, HP Mostar
- 88242 – Posušje-Lager, HP Mostar
- 88240 – Posušje-Općina, HP Mostar
- 78216 – Potkozarje, Pošte Srpske
- 88208 – Potoci, BH Pošta
- 78435 – Potočani, Pošte Srpske
- 76298 – Potočani, HP Mostar - Temporarily closed
- 75433 – Potočari (Donji Potočari, Gornji Potočari), Pošte Srpske
- 73290 – Prača (Prača, Pale, Bosnian-Podrinje Canton Goražde, Prača, Pale, Istočno Sarajevo), BH Pošta
- 73245 – Prelovo, Pošte Srpske
- 79287 – Previja, Pošte Srpske
- 74276 – Pribinić, Pošte Srpske
- 75249 – Priboj, Pošte Srpske
- 79102 – Prijedor, Pošte Srpske
- 80202 – Priluka, HP Mostar - Temporarily closed
- 80245 – Prisoje, HP Mostar
- 78430 – Prnjavor, Pošte Srpske
- 74214 – Prnjavor Mali, Pošte Srpske
- 88327 – Prolog, HP Mostar - Temporarily closed
- 88440 – Prozor, HP Mostar
- 76292 – Prud, HP Mostar
- 70223 – Prusac, BH Pošta
- 71335 – Pržići, HP Mostar
- 72207 – Puhovac, BH Pošta
- 75305 – Puračić, BH Pošta

== R ==
- 88325 – Radišići, HP Mostar
- 75268 – Rainci Gornji, BH Pošta
- 88245 – Rakitno field, HP Mostar
- 71217 – Rakovica, BH Pošta
- 88370 – Ravno, HP Mostar
- 78249 – Razboj Ljevčanski, Pošte Srpske
- 76218 – Ražljevo, Pošte Srpske
- 79283 – Ribnik, Bosnia and Herzegovina, Pošte Srpske
- 77215 – Ripač, BH Pošta
- 73220 – Rogatica, Pošte Srpske
- 80247 – Roško Polje, HP Mostar
- 79226 – Rudice, Pošte Srpske
- 73260 – Rudo, Pošte Srpske
- 88347 – Ružići, HP Mostar

== S ==
- 79285 – Sanica Gornja, BH Pošta
- 79260 – Sanski Most, BH Pošta
- 75411 – Sapna, BH Pošta
- 78202 – Saračica, Pošte Srpske
- 71000 – Sarajevo, BH Pošta
- 71101 – Sarajevo-Centar, BH Pošta
- 71103 – Sarajevo-Centar, BH Pošta
- 71104 – Sarajevo-Centar, BH Pošta
- 71108 – Sarajevo-Centar, BH Pošta
- 71120 – Sarajevo-Novo Sarajevo, BH Pošta
- 71121 – Sarajevo-Novo Sarajevo, BH Pošta
- 71122 – Sarajevo-Novo Sarajevo, BH Pošta
- 71123 – Sarajevo-Novo Sarajevo, BH Pošta
- 71124 – Sarajevo-Novo Sarajevo, BH Pošta
- 71125 – Sarajevo-Novo Sarajevo, BH Pošta
- 71140 – Sarajevo-Stari Grad, BH Pošta
- 71141 – Sarajevo-Stari Grad, BH Pošta
- 71145 – Sarajevo-Stari Grad, BH Pošta
- 71160 – Sarajevo-Novi Grad, BH Pošta
- 71162 – Sarajevo-Novi Grad, BH Pošta
- 71165 – Sarajevo-Novi Grad, BH Pošta
- 71166 – Sarajevo-Novi Grad, BH Pošta
- 71167 – Sarajevo-Novi Grad, BH Pošta
- 71321 – Semizovac, BH Pošta
- 76205 – Seonjaci, HP Mostar
- 75207 – Simin Han, BH Pošta
- 78422 – Sitneši, Pošte Srpske
- 79283 – Sitnica, Pošte Srpske
- 74212 – Sjenina, Pošte Srpske
- 75436 – Skelani, Pošte Srpske
- 74261 – Skugrić Gornji, Pošte Srpske
- 75353 – Sladna, BH Pošta
- 78253 – Slatina, Pošte Srpske
- 74323 – Sočkovac, Pošte Srpske
- 71350 – Sokolac, Pošte Srpske
- 71357 – Sokolovići, Pošte Srpske
- 88345 – Sovići, HP Mostar
- 78420 – Srbac, Pošte Srpske
- 75430 – Srebrenica, Pošte Srpske
- 75350 – Srebrenik, BH Pošta
- 71385 – Srednje (Ilijaš), BH Pošta
- 79249 – Sreflije, Pošte Srpske
- 74208 – Stanari, Pošte Srpske
- 79268 – Stari Majdan, BH Pošta
- 72251 – Stari Vitez, BH Pošta
- 77224 – Stijena, BH Pošta
- 73223 – Stjenice, Pošte Srpske
- 75324 – Stjepan Polje, BH Pošta
- 88360 – Stolac, HP Mostar
- 72209 – Stranjani, BH Pošta
- 78208 – Stričići, Pošte Srpske
- 70273 – Strojice, Pošte Srpske
- 88323 – Studenci, HP Mostar
- 75283 – Stupari, BH Pošta
- 74221 – Suho Polje (Doboj), Pošte Srpske
- 76321 – Suho Polje (Bijeljina), Pošte Srpske
- 79229 – Svodna, Pošte Srpske

== Š ==
- 76230 – Šamac, Pošte Srpske
- 76209 – Šatorovići, BH Pošta
- 75450 – Šekovići, Pošte Srpske
- 75275 – Šerići, BH Pošta
- 75245 – Šibošnica, BH Pošta
- 78433 – Šibovska, Pošte Srpske
- 70270 – Šipovo, Pošte Srpske
- 78224 – Šiprage, Pošte Srpske
- 88220 – Široki Brijeg, HP Mostar
- 88221 – Široki Brijeg-ALTRA
- 88222 – Široki Brijeg-Cips
- 74279 – Šnjegotina Gornja, Pošte Srpske
- 75356 – Špionica, BH Pošta
- 77223 – Šturlić, BH Pošta
- 80249 – Šujica, HP Mostar
- 77234 – Šumatac, BH Pošta

== T ==
- 71244 – Tarčin, BH Pošta
- 75414 – Teočak, BH Pošta
- 74270 – Teslić, Pošte Srpske
- 74260 – Tešanj, BH Pošta
- 74266 – Tešanjka, BH Pošta
- 88348 – Tihaljina, HP Mostar
- 75357 – Tinja, BH Pošta
- 75455 – Tišća, Pošte Srpske
- 73311 – Tjentište, Pošte Srpske
- 77233 – Todorovo, BH Pošta
- 75265 – Tojšići, BH Pošta
- 76272 – Tolisa, HP Mostar
- 80240 – Tomislavgrad, HP Mostar
- 80241 – Tomislavgrad-Općina, HP Mostar
- 72213 – Topčić Polje,BH Pošta
- 70224 – Torlakovac, BH Pošta
- 72270 – Travnik, BH Pošta
- 88375 – Trebinja, HP Mostar - Temporarily closed
- 89101 – Trebinje, Pošte Srpske
- 78252 – Trn (Laktaši), Pošte Srpske
- 76335 – Trnova Donja, Pošte Srpske
- 71220 – Trnovo, Pošte Srpske
- 76310 – Trnjaci, Pošte Srpske
- 77225 – Tržačka Raštela, BH Pošta
- 72283 – Turbe, BH Pošta
- 75306 – Turija, BH Pošta
- 78404 – Turjak, Pošte Srpske
- 75000 – Tuzla, BH Pošta

== U ==
- 76330 – Ugljevik, Pošte Srpske
- 74278 – Ugodnovići, Pošte Srpske
- 70280 – Uskoplje, HP Mostar
- 74321 – Usora-Sivša, HP Mostar
- 74230 – Usora-Žabljak, HP Mostar
- 73250 – Ustikolina, BH Pošta
- 73265 – Uvac, Pošte Srpske
- 88444 – Uzdol, HP Mostar

== V ==
- 73249 – Vardište, Pošte Srpske
- 71330 – Vareš, BH Pošta
- 71333 – Vareš Majdan, BH Pošta
- 77243 – Varoška Rijeka, BH Pošta
- 74213 – Velika Bukovica, Pošte Srpske
- 77207 – Velika Gata, BH Pošta
- 77230 – Velika Kladuša, BH Pošta
- 76329 – Velika Obarska, Pošte Srpske
- 70234 – Vesela, BH Pošta
- 80208 – Vidoši, HP Mostar
- 76275 – Vidovice, HP Mostar
- 70202 – Vinac, BH Pošta
- 74455 – Vinska, Pošte Srpske
- 88247 – Vir, HP Mostar
- 71300 – Visoko, BH Pošta
- 73240 – Višegrad, Pošte Srpske
- 88307 – Višići, HP Mostar
- 72250 – Vitez, HP Mostar
- 88326 – Vitina, HP Mostar
- 74265 – Vitkovci Donji, Pošte Srpske
- 73205 – Vitkovići, BH Pošta
- 75440 – Vlasenica, Pošte Srpske
- 71320 – Vogošća, BH Pošta
- 88301 – Vojarna Grabovine, HP Mostar - Temporarily closed
- 72227 – Vozuća, BH Pošta
- 74487 – Vranjak 7, Pošte Srpske
- 74488 – Vranjak 8, Pošte Srpske
- 88113 – Vrapčići, BH Pošta
- 78211 – Vrbanja, Pošte Srpske
- 78225 – Vrbanjci, Pošte Srpske
- 78408 – Vrbaška, Pošte Srpske
- 79262 – Vrhpolje, BH Pošta
- 77231 – Vrnograč, BH Pošta
- 77203 – Vrsta, BH Pošta
- 76325 – Vršani, Pošte Srpske
- 76254 – Vučkovci, BH Pošta
- 74470 – Vukosavlje, Pošte Srpske

== Z ==
- 73287 – Zaborak, Pošte Srpske
- 76333 – Zabrđe, Pošte Srpske
- 78214 – Zalužani, Pošte Srpske
- 73305 – Zavajt, Pošte Srpske
- 72220 – Zavidovići, BH Pošta
- 74451 – Zborište, Pošte Srpske
- 77236 – Zborište, BH Pošta
- 76259 – Zelinja, BH Pošta
- 72101 – Zenica, BH Pošta
- 72102 – Zenica, BH Pošta
- 72112 – Zenica, BH Pošta
- 88286 – Zovi Do, Pošte Srpske
- 75400 – Zvornik, Pošte Srpske

== Ž ==
- 72236 – Željezno Polje, BH Pošta
- 72230 – Žepče, HP Mostar
- 75270 – Živinice, BH Pošta
- 71373 – Župča, BH Pošta
