= Gračanica =

Gračanica (pronounced [ɡratʃǎnitsa]) may refer to:

== Places ==
=== Bosnia and Herzegovina ===
- Gračanica, Bosnia and Herzegovina, a town and municipality near Tuzla
- Gračanica, Bugojno, a village
- Gračanica, Gacko, a village
- Gračanica, Prozor, a village
- Gračanica, Trnovo, a village
- Gračanica, Živinice, a village

=== Kosovo ===
- Gračanica, Kosovo, a town and municipality
- Gračanica Lake, a reservoir
- Gračanica river or Gračanka, a tributary to Sitnica

=== Montenegro ===
- Gračanica, Montenegro, a village

=== Serbia ===
- Gračanica, Ljubovija, a village in western Serbia
- Gračanica, Prijepolje, a village in southwest Serbia

== Churches ==
- Gračanica Monastery, a 14th-century monastery in Kosovo
  - Hercegovačka Gračanica, a copy in Trebinje, Bosnia and Herzegovina
  - New Gračanica Monastery, a copy in Third Lake, United States
- Valjevska Gračanica, a church in Tubravić, Serbia

== Other uses ==
- Battle of Gračanica or Battle of Tripolje, in Kosovo, 1402
- Eparchy of Gračanica or Eparchy of Lipljan, a former Eastern Orthodox eparchy in Kosovo
- Radio Gračanica, a Bosnian local public radio station
