= Potočani =

Potočani may refer to the following villages:

== Bosnia and Herzegovina ==
- Potočani, Bugojno, in the municipality of Bugojno
- Potočani, Doboj, in the municipality of Doboj
- Potočani, Livno, in the municipality of Livno
- Potočani, Novi Travnik, in the municipality of Novi Travnik
- Potočani, Odžak and Vukosavlje, split between the municipalities of Odžak and Vukosavlje
- Potočani, Tešanj, in the municipality of Tešanj

== Croatia ==
- Potočani, Velika, in the municipality of Velika
- Potočani, Đulovac, in the municipality of Đulovac

== See also ==
- Potočari (disambiguation)
