= Vrnograč Castle =

Medieval castle in Bosnia and Herzegovina

Coordinates: 45.162°N 15.954°E

- Vrnograč, Bosnia and Herzegovina
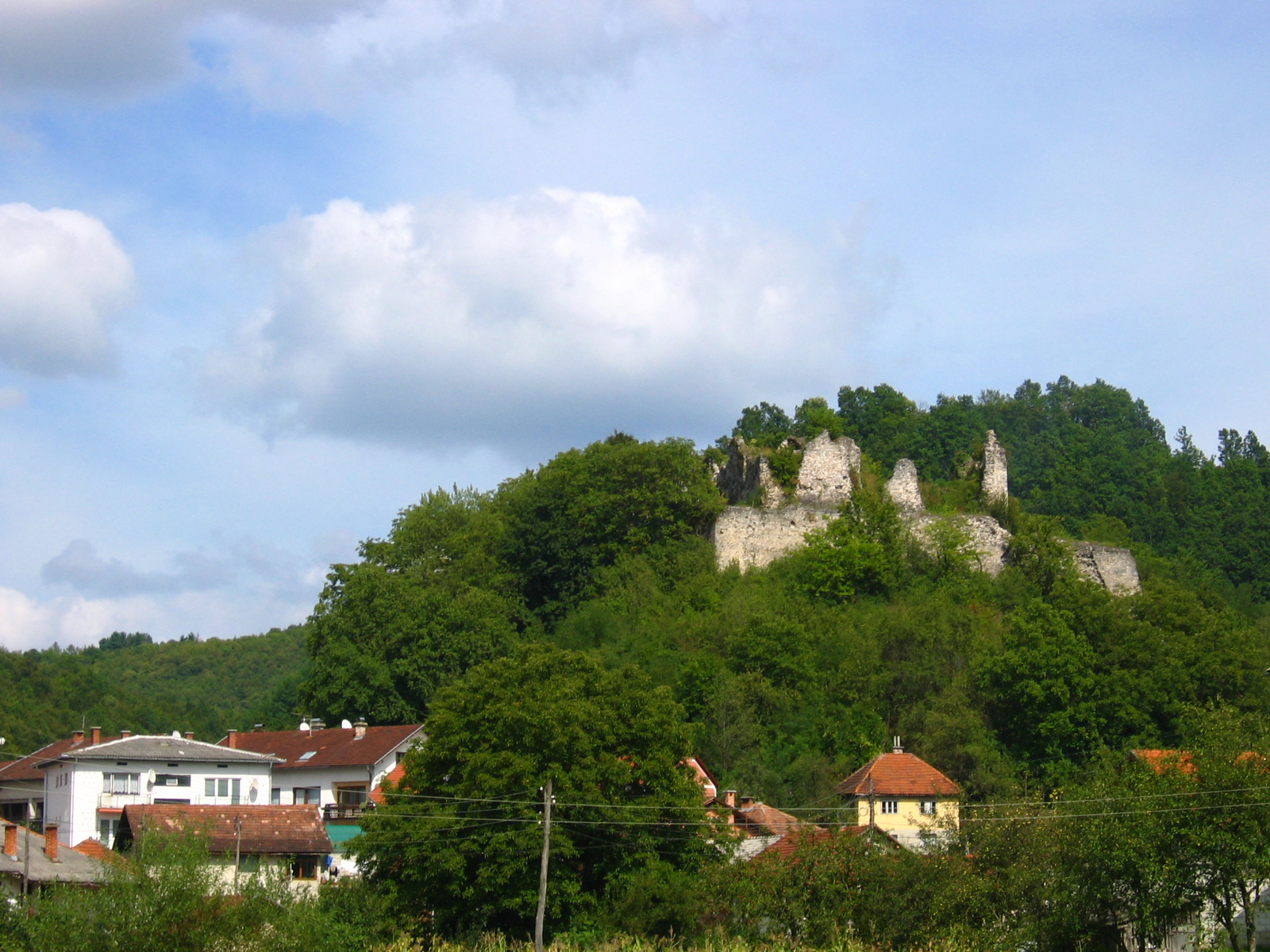

Location

Vrnograč Castle is a castle in Bosnia and Herzegovina, built during the Middle Ages on the territory of the municipality of Velika Kladuša.

== Location ==
The castle is situated on the top of the Pehovo hill, at 163 meters of height above the sea level, in the town of Vrnograč.

== History ==
The castle is first mentioned in written sources in 1264, in a charter issued by Hungarian king Bela IV, who as a token of his gratitude, gifted the feudal lands of Topusko, Podzvizd and Vrnograč to Brothers Kreščić. In 1456, Hungarian king Ladislav allowed the successors of the Kreščić tribe to build fortresses in Podzvizd and Vrnograč. While Podzvizd was built as a fortification, Vrnograč was built as a fortified castle of a pre-renneisance style.

After 1553 the castle changed hands from Austro Hungarians to Ottoman multiple times. In 1580, by the definition of Austrian war council, Podzvizd and Vrnograč were destroyed.

In 1636 the Ottoman army rebuilt the walls of Vrnograč and stationed 100 soldiers inside. A wooden Mosque was built near the entrance into the city itself.

In 1696 Adam Baćan conquered Vrnograč, and in 1697 it was yet again returned to the Ottomans. The retinue in the fort was under the authority of the captain. This retinue, in the first half of the XVIII century had 100 soldiers, 2 large and 2 small cannons. The fort was abandoned in 1840.

== Description ==
Vrnograč castle represents a good example of a fortified feudal castle which was commonplace during the Middle Ages. The fort had a rectangular formation of 27X19 meters. The inner walls of the fort were massive and built from stone. Their width was 80-100 centimeters, The width of the outer walls was 3 meters. These walls were built on the North-eastern side and they were of defensive character. on the corners of the fort stood three circular towers and one rectangular tower. The fort was in such a way that the outer parts were very well fortified, which gave a sense of security to the populace in regards of enemy attacks, all the while the inner chambers provided comfort and peace.

Nowadays, thick greenery has grown around the walls of the castle, making it hard to access. The remains of the walls are mostly torn down, destructed or carried somewhere else.

The Vrnograč castle has been declared a national monument of Bosnia and Herzegovina.
