= Lubarda =

- Village
- Location within Bosnia and Herzegovina
- Coordinates: 45.079105°N 16.005009°E
- Country: Bosnia and Herzegovina
- Entity: Federation of Bosnia and Herzegovina
- Canton: Una-Sana
- Municipality: Bužim

Area
  - Total: 7.60 sq mi (19.69 km^{2})

Population (2013)
  - Total: 3,198
  - Density: 420.7/sq mi (162.4/km^{2})
- Time zone: UTC+1 (CET)
  - Summer (DST): UTC+2 (CEST)

Lubarda (Cyrillic: Лубарда) is a village in the municipality of Bužim, Bosnia and Herzegovina.

== Demographics ==
According to the 2013 census, its population was 3,198.

Ethnicity in 2013
| Ethnicity | Number | Percentage |
|---|---|---|
| Bosniaks | 3,166 | 99.9% |
| Croats | 4 | 0.0% |
| other/undeclared | 28 | 0.1% |
| Total | 3,198 | 100% |
