= Mrazovac =

- Village
- Location within Bosnia and Herzegovina
- Coordinates: 45°05′00″N 16°04′19″E
- Country: Bosnia and Herzegovina
- Entity: Federation of Bosnia and Herzegovina
- Canton: Una-Sana
- Municipality: Bužim

Area
  - Total: 8.35 sq mi (21.62 km^{2})

Population (2013)
  - Total: 3,653
  - Density: 437.6/sq mi (169.0/km^{2})
- Time zone: UTC+1 (CET)
  - Summer (DST): UTC+2 (CEST)

Mrazovac (Cyrillic: Мразовац) is a village in the municipality of Bužim, Bosnia and Herzegovina.

== Demographics ==
According to the 2013 census, its population was 3,653.

Ethnicity in 2013
Ethnicity	Number	Percentage
Bosniaks	3,620	99.1%
other/undeclared	33	0.9%
Total	3,653	100%
