= Adaku =

- Gender: Female
- Language: Igbo

Origin
- Meaning: Daughter of wealth
- Region of origin: Igboland

Adaku // is a female given name of Igbo origin. It means "daughter of wealth" and is given to girls who are hoped to bring prosperity to the family. Moreover, because “Àdà” is, traditionally, a title for eldest daughters (equivalent to Okpara), Adaku and similar names are often reserved for the firstborn.

== Notable people with this name ==
- Adaku Ufere (born July 7 1985), Nigerian energy professional and lawyer
- Adaku Utah (born 1984), Nigerian artist and healer
- Adaku Okoroafor (born 18 November 1974), Nigerian footballer
- Viola Adaku Onwuliri (born 18 June 1956), Nigerian professor of biochemistry and politician
