= Potočari =

Potočari may refer to the following places in Bosnia and Herzegovina:

- Potočari, Srebrenica, a local community consisting of the two villages:
  - Donji Potočari
  - Gornji Potočari
- Potočari, Brčko, a village in the Brčko District

== See also ==
- Potočani (disambiguation)
