= Krupići =

Common family surname in Bosnia

Krupić (Cyrillic: Крупић) is a common family name found in Bosanska Krajina. The surname Krupić was named after Bosanska Krupa and It is the 7th most common surname in Sanski Most.

== History ==
=== During Ottoman times ===
The Krupić family was first named Arnautović, but later it became Krupić. At the start of the 18 century (around 1730) an Arnaut became the captain of Bosanska Krupa, his name was Omer-beg Arnautović and he was one of the captains that fought in the Battle of Banja Luka on the side of the Ottoman army. Mustaj-beg Arnautović, the son of Omer-beg Arnautovic served the captain's service in 1784. in 1778 he traded his land in a field of Sanski Most for a garden and other real estate in Dugo polje.In 1791 Omer-beg Arnautovic, the son of Mustaj-beg was the captain of Bosanska Krupa. After him his oldest son Husein-beg became the captain of Bosanska Krupa for a short time, around 1811 and he died before 1818. After Husein-beg his son Ahmet-beg became the captain of Bosanska Krupa, in 1821 he got killed by the Pasha of Travnik Ali Dželaludin. In 1830 Mehmed-beg Krupić-Arnautović was on the place of the captain. in 1830 on September a meeting of Turkish and Austrian delegates was held in Vrngorač on border issues, and a meeting was held, at which this captain was also signed. Around 1830 the Bihac Krajina was divided in 4 captaincies which had 8970 armed people, Mehmed-beg the captain of Bosanska krupa and the lord of Krupa, Vrnograc, Todorovo, Buzim, Jezersko and Otoka had 1750 armed people and 35 cannons. in 1831 Ibrahim-beg the son of Omer-beg lived in Bosanska krupa.He was the son-in-law of Hasan-aga Pećki and he was very popular in Bosanska Krupa and the people liked him. He and his uncle were killed by the captain of Bosanska Krupa Mehmed-beg because he was scared that Ibrahim-beg would steal his captaincy. After this news came to Hasan-aga Pećki set fire to everything that belonged to the captain, he burned 45 Muslim and 12 Christian houses. Mehmed-beg was a faithful supporter of Husein kapetan Gardaščević and he is seen as the most loyal supporter of him. Even after many betrayed Husein kapetan Gardaščević he left Bosnia together with him. Even when Husein kapetan Gardaščević went to Carigrad Mehmed-beg went together with him. Mehmed-beg raised a revolt together with the captains of Ostrozac and Petrovac because of the removal of the captaincy, he was captured in 1837 and brought to Sarajevo, in Sarajevo he was equipped and brought to Trabzon where he returned in 1843. He lived in Krupa until 1850, until the arrival of Omer-paša and he was and remained an opponent of the reform. He was captured in 1851 and died that year in Travnik.

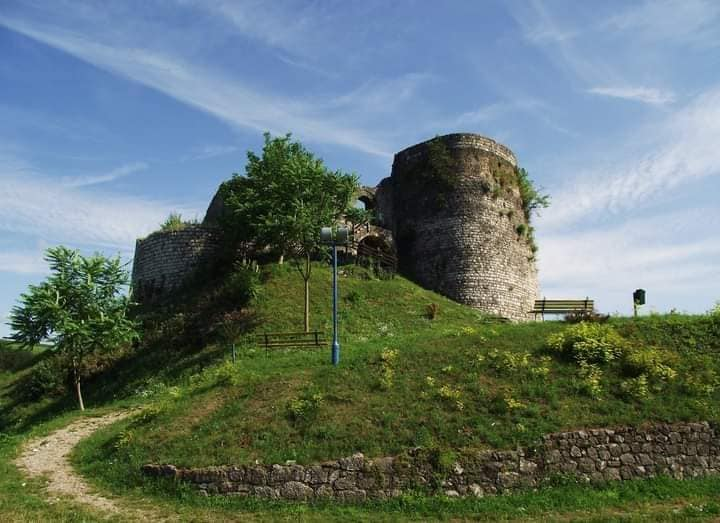
The Tower House in Bosanska Krupa of which the Krupić Family were captains of.

=== During Austro-Hungarian times ===
In the Austro-Hungarian time Krupići didn't play an important role in political events expect Ibrahim-beg Krupić who was elected as member of the National Waqf-Mearif Council. Sulejman beg Krupić was a Merchant in Zdena. Many Krupići died or were injured while fighting for the Bosnian-Herzegovinan Infantry in World war 1, for example Krupić Ahmetbeg des Zambey who was born in 1862 in Zdena and died in 1917.

== Genealogy ==
The genealogy of this family is not clear enough, so Kreševljaković, in his attempt to establish it, was more concerned with speculation than he was able to solve this task thoroughly and with arguments. He said that the son of Omer was Mustaj and that Mustaj had a son Omer and Husein and that Omer had a son named Mustafa that died before his father's death and that he had 3 other sons named Dervis-beg, Ibrahim-beg and Husein-beg. Husein-beg had a son named Ahmed-beg and Dervis-beg had a son named Mehmed-beg and that Mehmed-beg had a son named Dervis-beg.

== Possessions ==
The dormitory of the Krupic family was in the center of Bosanska Krupa. The Krupic family had estates in Buzim and Dubovik.

Peasant settlements of the Krupić family in 1918
District	Total number of settlements	Known surface	Only the name of the serf is known	Arable land	Forests	Meadows	Others	Total
Bosanska Krupa	211	109	102	5,532,999	1,300,495	369,907	412,407	7,615,808
Bosanski Novi	54	6	48					292,38
Bosanski Petrovac	15		15					
Derventa	10		10					
Prnjavor	41		41					
Cazin	5		5					
Sanski Most	60	7	53	652,5	177,8	95,19	56,38	981,87
Total	396	122	274	6.182,499	1.478,295	495,097	468,787	8.890,058

Fugitives of the Krupić family in 1918
District	Place	Arable Land	Uncultivated land	Total
Prnjavor	Palačkovci	1,362,613	489,895	1,825,508
Sanski Most	Hadrovci	67,98	601,34	669,32
Bosanski Novi	Kršlje	141,17	1,017,89	1,1159,06
Total		1,571,763	2,109,125	3,680,888

== Notable people ==
- Enver Krupic, painter
- Safet Krupic, philosopher
- Fetah Krupic, politician
- Husein Krupic, carpenter
