= Potočari, Srebrenica =

Potocari, Srebrenica may refer to:

- Donji Potočari (transl. Lower Potočari), near Srebrenica, Bosnia and Herzegovina
- Gornji Potočari (transl. Upper Potočari), near Srebrenica, Bosnia and Herzegovina
- Srebrenica Genocide Memorial, commemorating victims of the 1995 Srebrenica massacre
