= Konjodor, Bužim =

Konjodor
- Village
- Location within Bosnia and Herzegovina
- Country: Bosnia and Herzegovina
- Entity: Federation of Bosnia and Herzegovina
- Canton: Una-Sana
- Municipality: Bužim

Area
  - Total: 4.94 sq mi (12.79 km^{2})

Population (2013)
  - Total: 2,085
  - Density: 422.2/sq mi (163.0/km^{2})
- Time zone: UTC+1 (CET)
  - Summer (DST): UTC+2 (CEST)

Konjodor (Cyrillic: Коњодер) is a village in the municipality of Bužim, Bosnia and Herzegovina.

== Demographics ==
According to the 2013 census, its population was 2,085.

Ethnicity in 2013
| Ethnicity | Number | Percentage |
|---|---|---|
| Bosniaks | 2,078 | 99.7% |
| other/undeclared | 7 | 0.3% |
| Total | 2,085 | 100% |
