= Varoška Rijeka =

- Village
- Location within Bosnia and Herzegovina
- Coordinates: 45°05′05″N 16°00′51″E
- Country: Bosnia and Herzegovina
- Entity: Federation of Bosnia and Herzegovina
- Canton: Una-Sana
- Municipality: Bužim

Area
  - Total: 9.32 sq mi (24.13 km^{2})

Population (2013)
  - Total: 5,400
  - Density: 580/sq mi (220/km^{2})
- Time zone: UTC+1 (CET)
  - Summer (DST): UTC+2 (CEST)

Varoška Rijeka (Cyrillic: Варошка Ријека) is a village in the municipality of Bužim, Bosnia and Herzegovina.

== Demographics ==
According to the 2013 census, its population was 5,400.

Ethnicity in 2013
Ethnicity	Number	Percentage
Bosniaks	5,363	99.3%
Croats	1	0.0%
other/undeclared	36	0.7%
Total	5,400	100%

== See also ==
- Crvarevac
- Bužim
- Zborište, municipality of Velika Kladuša
