= Bužim Fort =

Castle in Bužim, Bosnia and Herzegovina

Coordinates: 45.048°N 16.031°E

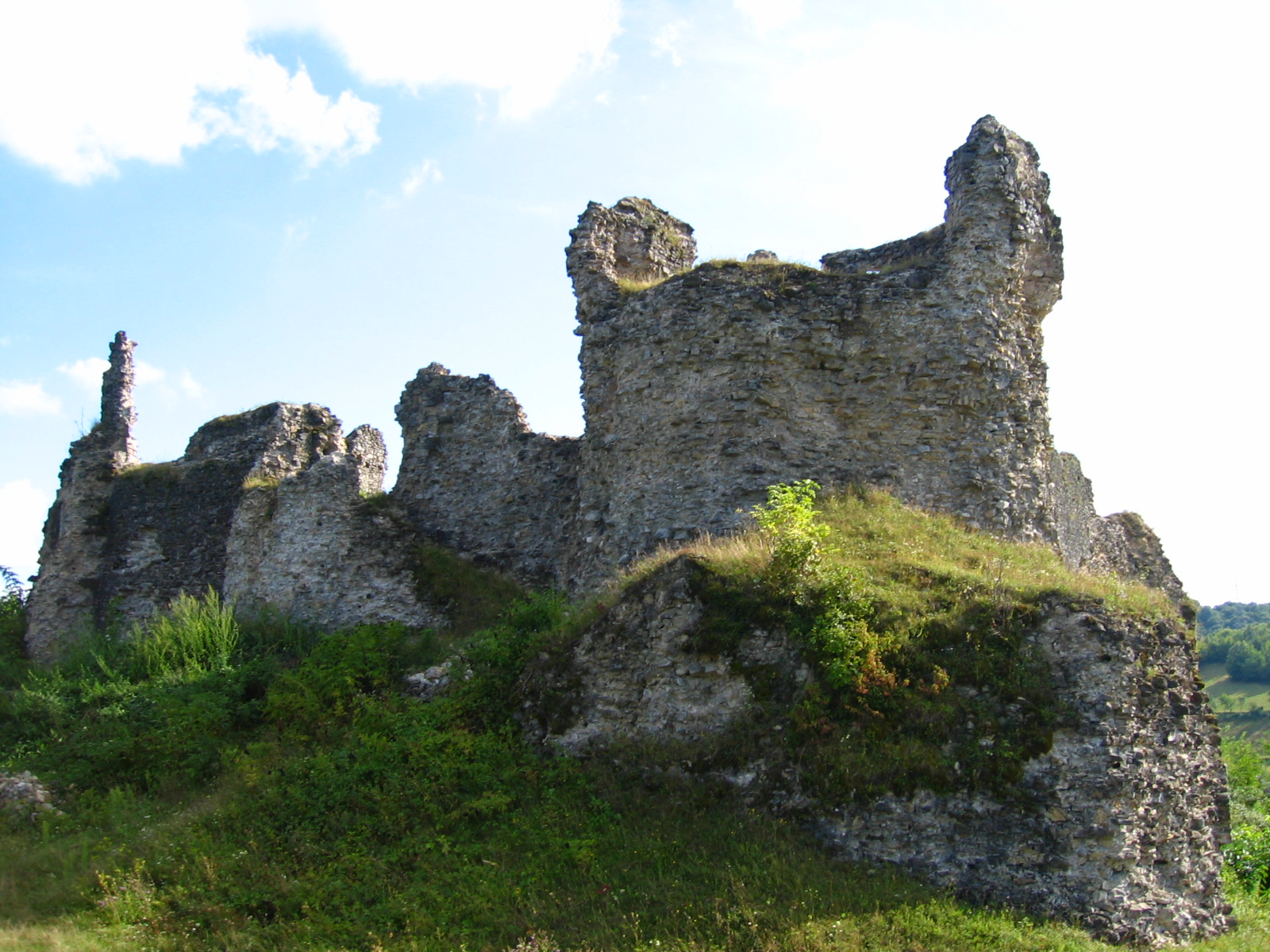
- Ruins of Bužim Castle

Bužim Castle (Bosnian: Tvrđava Bužim, Stari grad Bužim, lit. "Old City of Bužim") is a castle in the Bužim municipality in northwestern Bosnia and Herzegovina. The castle was built during the 12th century, and is located at 325 metres (1,066 ft) above sea level. It was the second-biggest medieval castle in Cazinska krajina (today in the Una-Sana Canton), after Bihać. The castle is an example of renaissance architecture, and served as both a military hill fort and a residence for the nobility. Bužim Castle and a nearby old mosque are protected as national monuments in Bosnia and Herzegovina.

== History ==
Bužim Castle is mentioned in historical documents under two names: Čava and Bužim. Even though Bužim Castle is one of the biggest and most important forts built during the Middle Ages in Bosnia and Herzegovina and Bosnian Krajina, there is no information about its creation. The way it was built leads one to believe that it was built during the 14th century.

In a document from 1334, St. Clements Bužim Parish is mentioned, belonging to the bishopric of Zagreb. The area was owned by the feudal lord Grgur Galesu, whose successors sold their shares to Blagajski nobles in 1425. Between 1429 and 1456, the land was under the possession of the counts of Celje, then Frankopans and finally Mikuličići. In the year 1495, the lands of Juraj Mikuličić are inherited by noble Keglević family, thanks to the family lines. The Keglević nobles were allowed by king Ludovik to extract gold, silver, copper and other precious metals on the territory of the town of Bužim, provided they pay him taxes.

In October 1530. the Ottomans pillaged the area surrounding Bužim, and in the year of 1564 Mustafa-Beg Sokolović conquered Cazin, Bužim and Bojna, but he was suppressed and pushed back. Bužim finally came under the Ottoman rule in 1576, under the leader of Ottoman military, Ferhad-Pasha. The Ottomans stationed fifty horsemen and one hundred and thirty infantrymen in the fort.

During the Great Turkish War (in 1685, 1686 and 1688) the fort was conquered by Christian armies, but they were unable to keep it. In the year of 1737, during the siege of Banja Luka, the Christian armies also attacked Bužim, but yet again it was not conquered.

The fort was restored in 1626, and later in 1833. In 1833, there was 18 cannons stationed in the fort, and the town itself belonged to Bosanska Krupa Captaincy.

== Description of the fort ==
The fort has both interior and exterior. The complete complex has the area of 7267 m2. The inner, older fort was a smaller castle, with an upright, square foundation with circular towers on the corners.

By the end of the fifteenth century the fort was bolstered by new, trapezoid like fortifications, on whose angles stood polygonal towers. Its walls were distanced 15–20 meters from the walls of old fortification. The width of the walls is 2 meters. The complete length of the northern and the western wall are preserved, the southern wall is partly preserved, and the eastern wall is removed. The height of the walls is 5–8 meters.

The walls of the new fortifications are significantly lower, and they had places provided for cannons at the top. On the same time, the positions for artillery were built on both the towers and the walls. By building the new defensive wall, the old fort was protected from the effects of artillery, and the perimeter of the fort was defended from the towers of the old, inner fort, as they were significantly taller than the ones of the newer fort.

When the Ottomans conquered Bužim, the stone Mosque was built inside the older fortification.

Bužim castle was named a national monument of Bosnia and Herzegovina.

== Literature ==
Hamdija Kreševljaković, Naše starine, 1953 - Old Bosnian towns
