= Okpara =

- Gender: Male
- Language: Igbo

Origin
- Meaning: Firstborn son
- Region of origin: Southeast Nigeria

Other names
- Variant forms: Okpala, Okwara, Opara

Okpara // is common Igbo surname. It was traditionally a title for the firstborn son, becoming a patronymic during the colonial era. Onitsha people use the variant “Okpala,” while the Ohafia people use “Okwara.” The spelling Opara is common in Owerri, though its pronunciation is identical to Okpara.

== Notable people with this name ==
- Michael Okpara (1920-1984), Nigerian politician
- Godwin Okpara (born 1972), Nigerian footballer
- Uga Okpara (born 1982), Nigerian footballer
- Willy Okpara (born 1968), Nigerian footballer
- Judith Okpara Mazagwu, Nigerian actress and performing artist
- Felix Okpara, American basketball player

== Notable places with this name ==
- Okpara, Benin, administrative area of Benin
- Okpara Inland, a community in Delta State, Nigeria
- Michael Okpara University of Agriculture, Umudike, Abia State, Nigeria
- Okpara River, river of Benin
