= Bistrik-Crkvenjak =

Village in Kakanj, Bosnia and Herzegovina

- Village
- Location within Bosnia and Herzegovina
- Coordinates: 44°06′12″N 18°10′45″E
- Country: Bosnia and Herzegovina
- Entity: Federation of Bosnia and Herzegovina
- Canton: Zenica-Doboj
- Municipality: Kakanj

Area
  - Total: 0.53 sq mi (1.38 km^{2})

Population (2013)
  - Total: 207
  - Density: 388/sq mi (150/km^{2})
- Time zone: UTC+1 (CET)
  - Summer (DST): UTC+2 (CEST)

Bistrik-Crkvenjak is a village in the municipality of Kakanj, Federation of Bosnia and Herzegovina, Bosnia and Herzegovina.

== History ==
Before 1991, the village was attached to the locality of Haljinići; since 1991, it has been listed as an administrative entity in its own right.

== Demographics ==
According to the 2013 census, its population was 207.

Ethnicity in 2013
Ethnicity	Number	Percentage
Bosniaks	128	61.8%
Croats	79	38.2%
Total	207	100%
