= Opara =

Opara may refer to:

- Andro Krstulović Opara (born 1967), Croatian politician
- Austin Opara (born 1963), Nigerian politician
- Charity Opara (born 1972), Nigerian sprinter
- Christy Opara-Thompson (born 1971), Nigerian sprinter
- David Opara (born 1985), Nigerian footballer
- Emeka Opara (born 1985), Nigerian footballer
- Ike Opara (born 1989), American soccer player
- Jerzy Opara (born 1948), Polish sprint canoer
- Lloyd Opara (born 1984), British footballer

== Other uses ==
- Oparo, an alternate name for Rapa Iti, one of the Bass Islands in French Polynesia
- Opara, Novi Travnik, a village in Bosnia and Herzegovina

== See also ==
- Opera (disambiguation)
