= Crvarevac =

- Village
- Location within Bosnia and Herzegovina
- Coordinates: 45.1414°N 15.9911°E
- Country: Bosnia and Herzegovina
- Entity: Federation of Bosnia and Herzegovina
- Canton: Una-Sana
- Municipality: Velika Kladuša

Area
  - Total: 1.64 sq mi (4.26 km^{2})

Population (2013)
  - Total: 691
  - Density: 420/sq mi (162/km^{2})
- Time zone: UTC+1 (CET)
  - Summer (DST): UTC+2 (CEST)

Crvarevac is a village located in the northwestern part of Bosnia and Herzegovina. It is about an hour away from Velika Kladuša and borders Zborište, municipality of Velika Kladuša, Čaglica, Varoška Rijeka and Bužim. The former mayor of Velika Kladuša, Admil Mulalić, grew up in this village.

== Demographics ==
According to the 2013 census, its population was 691.

Ethnicity in 2013
Ethnicity	Number	Percentage
Bosniaks	654	94.6%
other/undeclared	37	5.4%
Total	691	100%
