= Vareš Majdan =

- Village
- Location within Bosnia and Herzegovina
- Coordinates: 44.136312°N 18.3077258°E
- Country: Bosnia and Herzegovina
- Entity: Federation of Bosnia and Herzegovina
- Canton: Zenica-Doboj
- Municipality: Vareš

Area
  - Total: 0.58 sq mi (1.50 km^{2})

Population (2013)
  - Total: 1,083
  - Density: 1,870/sq mi (722/km^{2})
- Time zone: UTC+1 (CET)
  - Summer (DST): UTC+2 (CEST)

Vareš Majdan is a village in the municipality of Vareš, Bosnia and Herzegovina.

== Demographics ==
According to the 2013 census, its population was 1,083.

Ethnicity in 2013
Ethnicity	Number	Percentage
Bosniaks	609	56.2%
Croats	293	27.1%
Serbs	59	5.4%
other/undeclared	122	11.3%
Total	1,083	100%
