= Kuljani =

Kuljani Куљани (Serbian)
- Village (Selo)
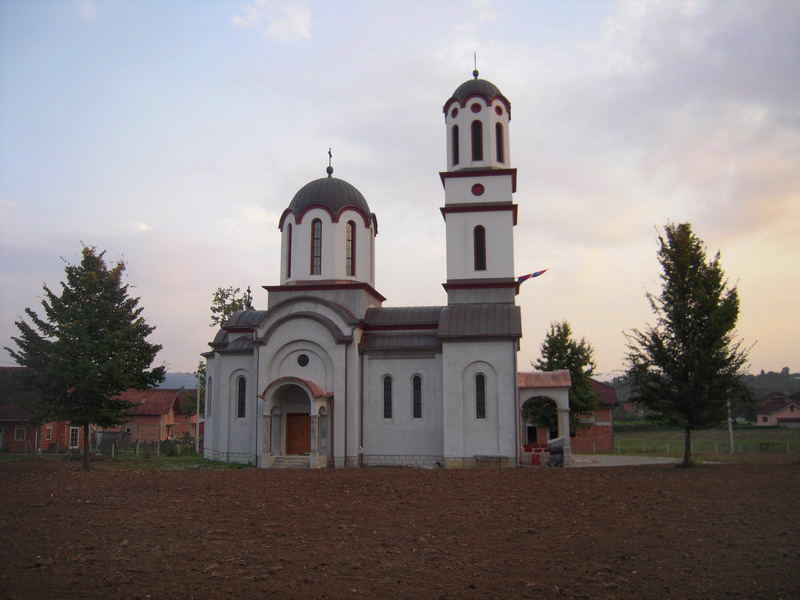

- Location within Bosnia and Herzegovina
- Coordinates: 44°50′50″N 17°11′52″E
- Country: Bosnia and Herzegovina
- Entity: Republika Srpska
- Municipality: Banja Luka

Population (2013)
  - Total: 4,294
- Time zone: UTC+1 (CET)
  - Summer (DST): UTC+2 (CEST)
- Area code: +387 51

Kuljani (Serbian Cyrillic: Куљани) is a village in the municipality of Banja Luka, Republika Srpska, Bosnia and Herzegovina. It lies about 10 km north from the city on the left side of the river Vrbas.

== History ==
This settlement was known for its catholic population through the last few centuries. Most of the population moved to Croatia during the last civil war in Yugoslavia (1992-1995). After the war this small village started to expand. A large number of new residents were Serbian refugees who found a new place for living after they had lost their old homes during the war. The village began to grow and soon became a suburban part of Banja Luka City.

== Public infrastructure ==
The road infrastructure is still in very bad shape since there is no budget investment planned. As of 2010, there is a post office in operation and a medical ambulance is in planning to be opened. The old public school is also still operational.

== Population ==
National census	1991	1981	1971
Croats	773 (64,04%)	760 (68,03%)	736 (85,28%)
Serbs	283 (23,44%)	222 (19,87%)	93 (10,77%)
Muslim	3 (0,24%)	0	0
Yugoslavs	73 (6,04%)	101 (9,04%)	0
rest and unknown	75 (6,21%)	34 (3,04%)	34 (3,93%)
Altogether	1.207	1.117	863

In 2008 the maximal estimated population counted 3,742. There is also a small group of Slovenians in the village.

== Trivia ==
A local proverb goes Culjani - selo ljepše od Pariza (Kuljani - this village is more beautiful than Paris)
