= Sivša =

- Village
- Location within Bosnia and Herzegovina
- Coordinates: 44.6920572°N 17.9758427°E
- Country: Bosnia and Herzegovina
- Entity: Federation of Bosnia and Herzegovina
- Canton: Zenica-Doboj
- Municipality: Usora

Area
  - Total: 3.38 sq mi (8.75 km^{2})

Population (2013)
  - Total: 1,295
  - Density: 383/sq mi (148/km^{2})
- Time zone: UTC+1 (CET)
  - Summer (DST): UTC+2 (CEST)

Sivša is a village in the municipality of Usora, Bosnia and Herzegovina.

== Demographics ==
According to the 2013 census, its population was 1,295.

Ethnicity in 2013
| Ethnicity | Number | Percentage |
|---|---|---|
| Croats | 1,270 | 98.1% |
| Serbs | 9 | 0.7% |
| Bosniaks | 4 | 0.3% |
| other/undeclared | 12 | 0.9% |
| Total | 1,295 | 100% |
