= Haljinići =

Village in Kakanj, Bosnia and Herzegovina

Haljinići Хаљинићи
- Village
- Location within Bosnia and Herzegovina
- Coordinates: 44°06′N 18°10′E
- Country: Bosnia and Herzegovina
- Entity: Federation of Bosnia and Herzegovina
- Canton: Zenica-Doboj
- Municipality: Kakanj

Area
  - Total: 0.52 sq mi (1.34 km^{2})

Population (2013)
  - Total: 262
  - Density: 506/sq mi (196/km^{2})
- Time zone: UTC+1 (CET)
  - Summer (DST): UTC+2 (CEST)

Haljinići (Cyrillic: Хаљинићи) is a village in the municipality of Kakanj, Bosnia and Herzegovina.

== History ==
Before 1991 village Haljinići also included settlement Bistrik-Crkvenjak, which since 1991 has been listed as an administrative entity in its own right.

== Demographics ==
According to the 2013 census, its population was 262.

Ethnicity in 2013
Ethnicity	Number	Percentage
Bosniaks	54	20.6%
Croats	194	74.0%
Serbs	1	0.4%
other/undeclared	13	5.0%
Total	262	100%
