= Gračanica, Montenegro =

Gračanica Грачаница
- Village
- Location within Montenegro
- Coordinates: 42.6960°N 19.8458°E
- Country: Montenegro
- Municipality: Andrijevica

Population (2023)
  - Total: 172
- Time zone: UTC+1 (CET)
  - Summer (DST): UTC+2 (CEST)

Gračanica (Serbian Cyrillic: Грачаница) is a village in the municipality of Andrijevica, Montenegro.

== Demographics ==
According to the 2023 census, it had a population of 172 people.

Ethnicity in 2011
Ethnicity	Number	Percentage
Serbs	176	64.7%
Montenegrins	92	33.8%
other/undeclared	4	1.5%
Total	272	100%
