= Hajderovići =

- Village
- Location within Bosnia and Herzegovina
- Coordinates: 44.4583251°N 18.2499468°E
- Country: Bosnia and Herzegovina
- Entity: Federation of Bosnia and Herzegovina
- Canton: Zenica-Doboj
- Municipality: Zavidovići

Area
  - Total: 4.81 sq mi (12.46 km^{2})

Population (2013)
  - Total: 1,784
  - Density: 370.8/sq mi (143.2/km^{2})
- Time zone: UTC+1 (CET)
  - Summer (DST): UTC+2 (CEST)

Hajderovići is a village in the municipality of Zavidovići, Bosnia and Herzegovina.

== Demographics ==
According to the 2013 census, its population was 1,784.

Ethnicity in 2013
| Ethnicity | Number | Percentage |
|---|---|---|
| Bosniaks | 1,768 | 99.7% |
| other/undeclared | 16 | 0.3% |
| Total | 1,784 | 100% |
