= Podorašac =

Podorašac Подорашац
- Village
- Location within Bosnia and Herzegovina
- Coordinates: 43°42′N 17°59′E
- Country: Bosnia and Herzegovina
- Entity: Federation of Bosnia and Herzegovina
- Canton: Herzegovina-Neretva
- Municipality: Konjic

Area
  - Total: 0.79 sq mi (2.04 km^{2})

Population (2013)
  - Total: 666
  - Density: 846/sq mi (326/km^{2})
- Time zone: UTC+1 (CET)
  - Summer (DST): UTC+2 (CEST)

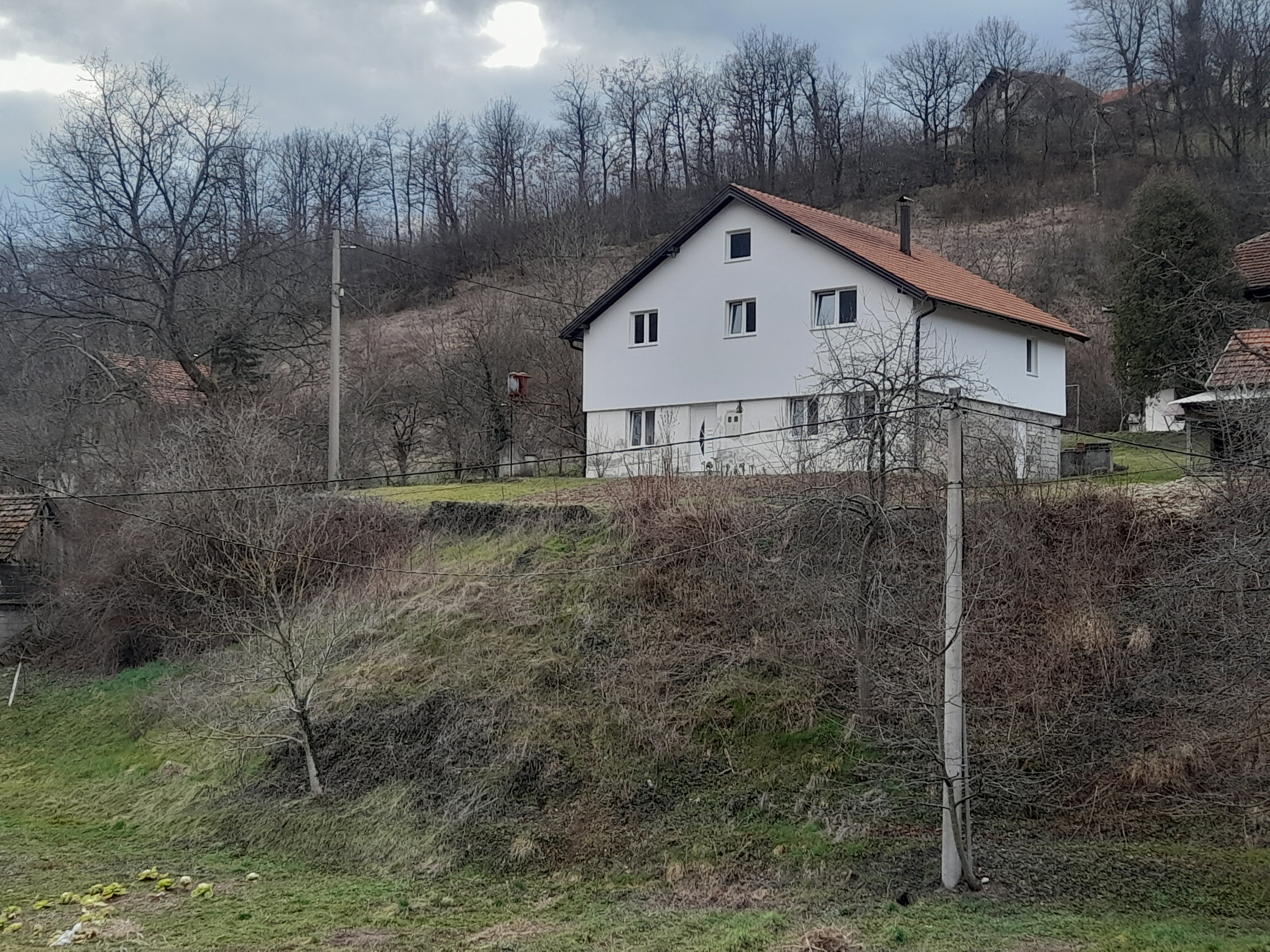

Podorašac (Cyrillic: Подорашац) is a village in the municipality of Konjic, Bosnia and Herzegovina.

== Demographics ==
According to the 2013 census, its population was 666.

Ethnicity in 2013
Ethnicity	Number	Percentage
Bosniaks	645	96.8%
Croats	14	2.1%
other/undeclared	7	1.1%
Total	666	100%
