= Prača, Pale, Istočno Sarajevo =

Prača
- Village
- Interactive map of Prača
- Location of Prača within Bosnia and Herzegovina
- Country: Bosnia and Herzegovina
- Entity: Republika Srpska
- City: Istočno Sarajevo
- Municipality: Pale

Area
  - Total: 11.89 km^{2} (4.59 sq mi)
  - Land: 11.89 km^{2} (4.59 sq mi)

Population (2013)
  - Total: 125
  - Density: 10.5/km^{2} (27.2/sq mi)

Prača (Serbian: Прача) is a village in the Municipality of Pale in Republika Srpska, an entity of Bosnia and Herzegovina. According to the 2013 census, the population was 125.

== Bibliography ==
- Резултати пописа: градови, опшптине, насељена мјеста (PDF). Banja Luka: Republika Srpska Institute of Statistics. 2017.
