= Hodovo =

- Village
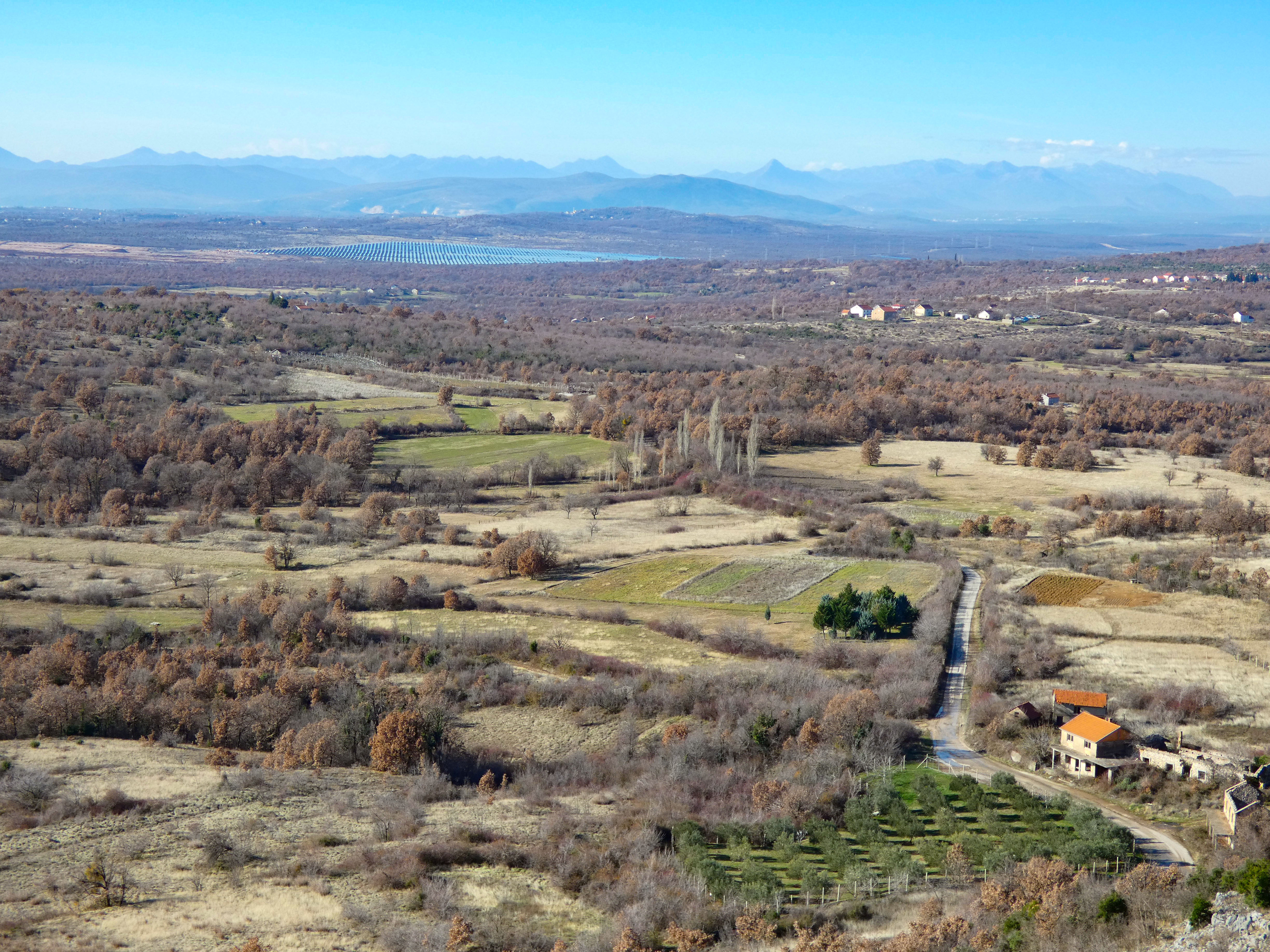

- Location within Bosnia and Herzegovina
- Coordinates: 43.1538653°N 17.9197739°E
- Country: Bosnia and Herzegovina
- Entity: Republika Srpska; Federation of Bosnia and Herzegovina
- Canton: Herzegovina-Neretva
- Municipality: Berkovići; Stolac

Area
  - Total: 5.51 sq mi (14.27 km^{2})

Population (2013)
  - Total: 385
  - Density: 69.9/sq mi (27.0/km^{2})
- Time zone: UTC+1 (CET)
  - Summer (DST): UTC+2 (CEST)

Hodovo is a village in the municipalities of Berkovići, Republika Srpska, and Stolac, the Herzegovina-Neretva Canton, the Federation of Bosnia and Herzegovina, Bosnia and Herzegovina.

== Demographics ==
According to the 2013 census, its population was 8 Bosniaks in the Berkovići part and 377 people in the Stolac part.

Ethnicity in 2013
Ethnicity	Number	Percentage
Croats	339	88.0%
Bosniaks	46	12.0%
Total	385	100%
