= Stranjani =

- Village
- Location within Bosnia and Herzegovina
- Coordinates: 44.2330587°N 17.8302517°E
- Country: Bosnia and Herzegovina
- Entity: Federation of Bosnia and Herzegovina
- Canton: Zenica-Doboj
- Municipality: Zenica

Area
  - Total: 3.19 sq mi (8.25 km^{2})

Population (2013)
  - Total: 1,353
  - Density: 425/sq mi (164/km^{2})
- Time zone: UTC+1 (CET)
  - Summer (DST): UTC+2 (CEST)

Stranjani is a village in the City of Zenica, Bosnia and Herzegovina.

== Demographics ==
According to the 2013 census, its population was 1,353.

Ethnicity in 2013
Ethnicity	Number	Percentage
Bosniaks	1,271	93.9%
Croats	49	3.6%
Serbs	1	0.1%
other/undeclared	32	2.4%
Total	1,353	100%
