= Zborište, Velika Kladuša =

Zborište Збориште
- Village
- Interactive map of Zborište
- Location within Bosnia and Herzegovina
- Country: Bosnia and Herzegovina
- Entity: Federation of Bosnia and Herzegovina
- Canton: Una-Sana
- Municipality: Velika Kladuša

Area
  - Total: 5.67 sq mi (14.68 km^{2})

Population (2013)
  - Total: 1,226
  - Density: 216.3/sq mi (83.51/km^{2})
- Time zone: UTC+1 (CET)
  - Summer (DST): UTC+2 (CEST)

Zborište is a village in the municipality of Velika Kladuša, Bosnia and Herzegovina.

The majority of people who live here are Bosniaks. Zborište's mosque is located in the center of town.

== Demographics ==
According to the 2013 census, its population was 1,226.

Ethnicity in 2013
Ethnicity	Number	Percentage
Bosniaks	1,188	96.9%
Croats	6	0.5%
other/undeclared	32	2.6%
Total	1,226	100%

== See also ==
- Crvarevac
- Varoška Rijeka
- Islam in Bosnia
- Vrnograč
