= Počulica =

- Village
- Location within Bosnia and Herzegovina
- Coordinates: 44.1730271°N 17.8311029°E
- Country: Bosnia and Herzegovina
- Entity: Federation of Bosnia and Herzegovina
- Canton: Central Bosnia
- Municipality: Vitez

Area
  - Total: 1.04 sq mi (2.70 km^{2})

Population (2013)
  - Total: 422
  - Density: 405/sq mi (156/km^{2})
- Time zone: UTC+1 (CET)
  - Summer (DST): UTC+2 (CEST)

Počulica is a village in the municipality of Vitez, Bosnia and Herzegovina.

== Demographics ==
According to the 2013 census, its population was 422.

Ethnicity in 2013
Ethnicity	Number	Percentage
Bosniaks	418	99.1%
Croats	3	0.7%
other/undeclared	1	0.2%
Total	422	100%
