= Potočani, Novi Travnik =

Potočani
- Village
- Location within Bosnia and Herzegovina
- Coordinates: 44.1443943°N 17.649702°E
- Country: Bosnia and Herzegovina
- Entity: Federation of Bosnia and Herzegovina
- Canton: Central Bosnia
- Municipality: Novi Travnik

Area
  - Total: 0.76 sq mi (1.96 km^{2})

Population (2013)
  - Total: 194
  - Density: 256/sq mi (99.0/km^{2})
- Time zone: UTC+1 (CET)
  - Summer (DST): UTC+2 (CEST)

Potočani is a village in the municipality of Novi Travnik, Bosnia and Herzegovina.

== Demographics ==
According to the 2013 census, its population was 194, all Bosniaks.
