= Prelovo =

- Village
- Location within Bosnia and Herzegovina
- Coordinates: 43°51′16″N 19°15′38″E
- Country: Bosnia and Herzegovina
- Entity: Republika Srpska
- Municipality: Višegrad
- Time zone: UTC+1 (CET)
  - Summer (DST): UTC+2 (CEST)

Prelovo (Serbian: Прелово) is a village in the municipality of Višegrad, Bosnia and Herzegovina.
