= Suho Polje (Doboj) =

Suho Polje Сухо Поље
- Village
- Location within Bosnia and Herzegovina
- Coordinates: 44°42′54″N 18°09′48″E
- Country: Bosnia and Herzegovina
- Entity: Republika Srpska
- Municipality: Doboj
- Time zone: UTC+1 (CET)
  - Summer (DST): UTC+2 (CEST)

Suho Polje (Cyrillic: Сухо Поље) is a village in the municipality of Doboj, Republika Srpska, Bosnia and Herzegovina.
