= Trnjaci (Bijeljina) =

Trnjaci Трњаци (Serbian)
- Village (Selo)
- Location within Bosnia and Herzegovina
- Coordinates: 44°49′55″N 19°17′32″E
- Country: Bosnia and Herzegovina
- Municipality: Bijeljina
- Time zone: UTC+1 (CET)
  - Summer (DST): UTC+2 (CEST)

Trnjaci is a village in the municipality of Bijeljina, Bosnia and Herzegovina.
