= Pržići =

Village in Vareš, Bosnia and Herzegovina

- Village
- Location within Bosnia and Herzegovina
- Coordinates: 44.1477421°N 18.3476496°E
- Country: Bosnia and Herzegovina
- Entity: Federation of Bosnia and Herzegovina
- Canton: Zenica-Doboj
- Municipality: Vareš

Area
  - Total: 0.44 sq mi (1.15 km^{2})

Population (2013)
  - Total: 62
  - Density: 140/sq mi (54/km^{2})
- Time zone: UTC+1 (CET)
  - Summer (DST): UTC+2 (CEST)

Pržići is a village in the municipality of Vareš, Bosnia and Herzegovina.

== Demographics ==
According to the 2013 census, its population was 62, all Croats.
