= Prnjavor Mali (Doboj) =

Prnjavor Mali Прњавор Мали
- Village
- Location within Bosnia and Herzegovina
- Coordinates: 44°49′03″N 18°00′33″E
- Country: Bosnia and Herzegovina
- Entity: Republika Srpska
- Municipality: Doboj
- Time zone: UTC+1 (CET)
  - Summer (DST): UTC+2 (CEST)

Prnjavor Mali (Cyrillic: Прњавор Мали) is a village in the municipality of Doboj, Bosnia and Herzegovina.
