= Ljubače =

- Village
- Location within Bosnia and Herzegovina
- Coordinates: 44.4898681°N 18.5991859°E
- Country: Bosnia and Herzegovina
- Entity: Federation of Bosnia and Herzegovina
- Canton: Tuzla
- Municipality: Tuzla

Area
  - Total: 1.97 sq mi (5.10 km^{2})

Population (2013)
  - Total: 875
  - Density: 444/sq mi (172/km^{2})
- Time zone: UTC+1 (CET)
  - Summer (DST): UTC+2 (CEST)

Ljubače is a village in the municipality of Tuzla, Tuzla Canton, Bosnia and Herzegovina.

== Demographics ==
According to the 2013 census, its population was 875.

Ethnicity in 2013
Ethnicity	Number	Percentage
Croats	531	60.7%
Bosniaks	292	33.4%
Serbs	14	1.6%
other/undeclared	38	4.3%
Total	875	100%
