= Vrnograč =

Vrnograč Vrnograč / Врнограч
- Village
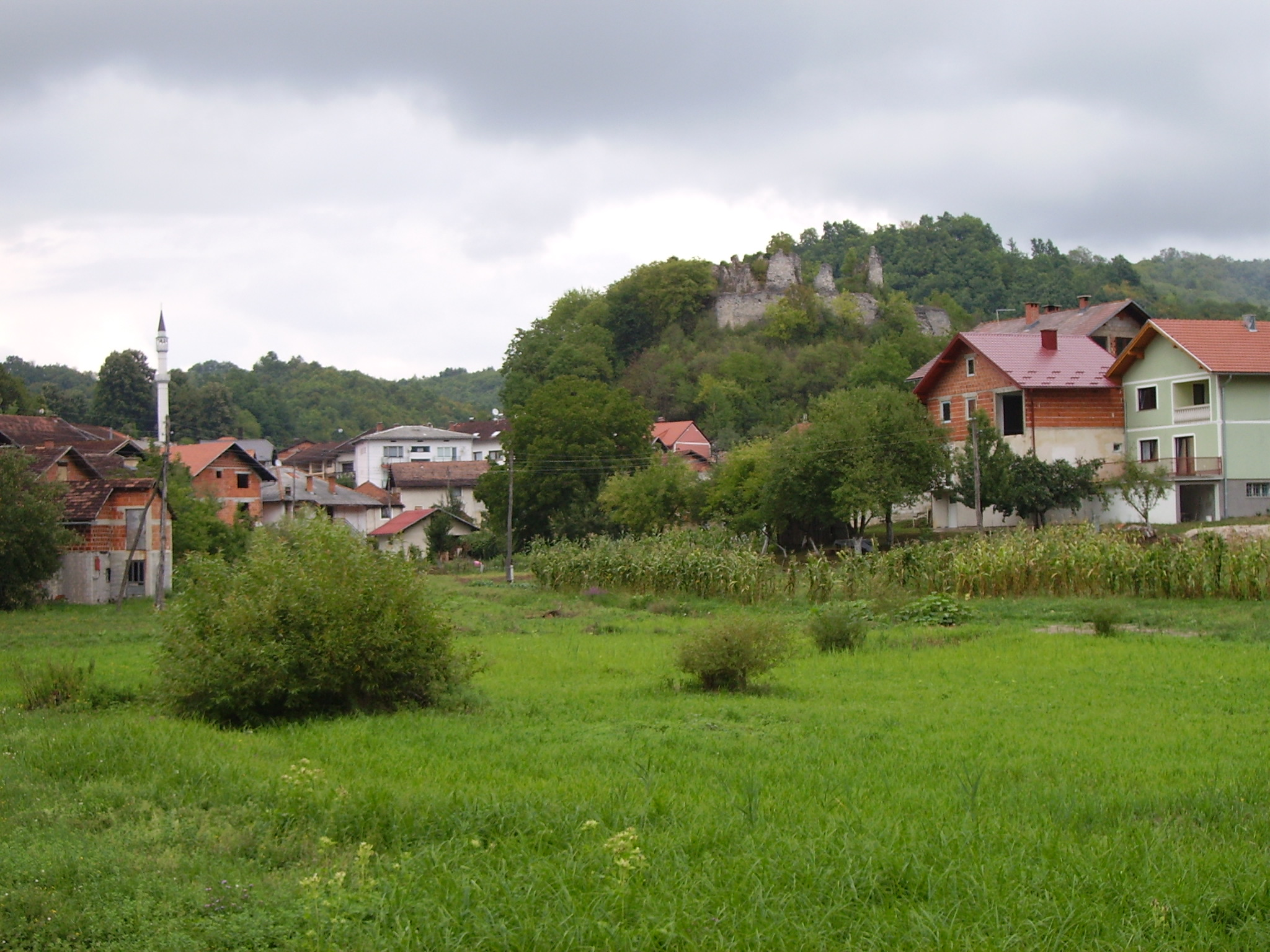
- Vrnograč from the west
- Interactive map of Vrnograč
- Location within Bosnia and Herzegovina
- Coordinates: 45.1636°N 15.9536°E
- Country: Bosnia and Herzegovina
- Entity: Federation of Bosnia and Herzegovina
- Canton: Una-Sana
- Municipality: Velika Kladuša

Area
  - Total: 0.67 sq mi (1.73 km^{2})

Population (2013)
  - Total: 762
  - Density: 1,140/sq mi (440/km^{2})
- Time zone: UTC+1 (CET)
  - Summer (DST): UTC+2 (CEST)

Vrnograč (Cyrillic: Врнограч) is a town in Bosnia and Herzegovina. It is located in the municipality of Velika Kladuša of the Una-Sana Canton and the Federation of Bosnia and Herzegovina. In the census of 1991, it had 1,201 people, including a majority of Bosniaks. According to the 2013 census, its population was 762.

== Sport ==
Vrnograč has one football stadium that is home to the football team NK Mladost Vrnograč.

== Demographics ==
=== Population Distribution ===
Locality of Vrnograc
census	1991	1981	1971
Bosniaks	1,104 (91.92%)	789 (82.27%)	546 (88.06%)
Serbs	37 (3.08%)	48 (5.00%)	29 (4.67%)
Croats	10 (0.83%)	4 (0.41%)	6 (0.96%)
Yugoslavs	30 (2.49%)	111 (11.57%)	21 (3.38%)
Others and unknown	20 (1.66%)	7 (0.72%)	18 (2.90%)
Total	1 .201	959	620

As of 2018, the broader municipal area has ~3,927 inhabitants, majority of whom are Bosniaks.

Nationality	Number	%
Bosniaks	5,026	97.05
Serbs	55	1.06
Yugoslavia	44	0.85
Croats	13	0.25
Unknown / Other	41	0.79

== See also ==
- Municipalities of Bosnia and Herzegovina
- Crvarevac
- Bužim
- Zborište, municipality of Velika Kladuša
