= Topčić Polje =

- Village
- Location within Bosnia and Herzegovina
- Coordinates: 44.3532214°N 17.9236364°E
- Country: Bosnia and Herzegovina
- Entity: Federation of Bosnia and Herzegovina
- Canton: Zenica-Doboj
- Municipality: Zenica

Area
  - Total: 3.90 sq mi (10.11 km^{2})

Population (2013)
  - Total: 1,188
  - Density: 304.3/sq mi (117.5/km^{2})
- Time zone: UTC+1 (CET)
  - Summer (DST): UTC+2 (CEST)

Topčić Polje is a village in the city of Zenica, Bosnia and Herzegovina. It is located on the northern banks of the River Bosna.

== Demographics ==
According to the 2013 census, its population was 1,188.

Ethnicity in 2013
Ethnicity	Number	Percentage
Bosniaks	1,169	98.4%
Croats	2	0.2%
other/undeclared	17	1.4%
Total	1,188	100%
