= Puhovac =

Coordinates: 43.4847°N 21.0153°E

- Village
- Interactive map of Puhovac
- Country: Serbia
- District: Šumadija
- Municipality: Aleksandrovac

Population (2002)
  - Total: 482
- Time zone: UTC+1 (CET)
  - Summer (DST): UTC+2 (CEST)

Puhovac (Serbian Cyrillic: Пуховац) is a village in the municipality of Aleksandrovac, Serbia. According to the 2002 census, the village has a population of 482 people.

== See also ==
- List of places in Serbia
