= Fajtovci =

- Village
- Location within Bosnia and Herzegovina
- Coordinates: 44.803740°N 16.602733°E
- Country: Bosnia and Herzegovina
- Entity: Federation of Bosnia and Herzegovina
- Canton: Una-Sana
- Municipality: Sanski Most

Area
  - Total: 1.47 sq mi (3.80 km^{2})

Population (2013)
  - Total: 362
  - Density: 247/sq mi (95.3/km^{2})
- Time zone: UTC+1 (CET)
  - Summer (DST): UTC+2 (CEST)

Fajtovci is a village in the municipality of Sanski Most, Federation of Bosnia and Herzegovina, Bosnia and Herzegovina.

== Demographics ==
According to the 2013 census, its population was 362.

Ethnicity in 2013
Ethnicity	Number	Percentage
Bosniaks	347	95.9%
Serbs	2	0.6%
other/undeclared	13	3.6%
Total	362	100%
