= Osječani =

- Village
- Location within Bosnia and Herzegovina
- Coordinates: 44.3732233°N 18.3818166°E
- Country: Bosnia and Herzegovina
- Entity: Federation of Bosnia and Herzegovina
- Canton: Zenica-Doboj
- Municipality: Zavidovići

Area
  - Total: 2.07 sq mi (5.36 km^{2})

Population (2013)
  - Total: 550
  - Density: 270/sq mi (100/km^{2})
- Time zone: UTC+1 (CET)
  - Summer (DST): UTC+2 (CEST)

Osječani is a village in the municipality of Zavidovići, Bosnia and Herzegovina.

== Demographics ==
According to the 2013 census, its population was 550.

Ethnicity in 2013
Ethnicity	Number	Percentage
Bosniaks	546	99.3%
Croats	1	0.2%
other/undeclared	3	0.5%
Total	550	100%
