= Podzvizd =

- Village
- Location within Bosnia and Herzegovina
- Coordinates: 45.175638°N 15.871818°E
- Country: Bosnia and Herzegovina
- Entity: Federation of Bosnia and Herzegovina
- Canton: Una-Sana
- Municipality: Velika Kladuša

Area
  - Total: 1.66 sq mi (4.30 km^{2})

Population (2013)
  - Total: 824
  - Density: 496/sq mi (192/km^{2})
- Time zone: UTC+1 (CET)
  - Summer (DST): UTC+2 (CEST)

Podzvizd is a village in the municipality of Velika Kladuša, Bosnia and Herzegovina.

== Demographics ==
According to the 2013 census, its population was 824.

Ethnicity in 2013
Ethnicity	Number	Percentage
Bosniaks	519	63.0%
Croats	3	0.4%
Serbs	1	0.1%
other/undeclared	301	36.5%
Total	824	100%
