= Gračanica, Živinice =

Gracanica
- Neighborhood
- Gračanica
- Location within Bosnia and Herzegovina
- Coordinates: 44.3964°N 18.7376°E
- Country: Bosnia and Herzegovina
- Entity: Federation of Bosnia and Herzegovina
- Canton: Tuzla
- Municipality: Živinice
- Official Language: Bosnian and English

Area
  - Total: 5.00 sq mi (12.96 km^{2})

Population (2025)
  - Total: 2,146
  - Density: 428.9/sq mi (165.6/km^{2})
- Time zone: UTC+1 (CET)
  - Summer (DST): UTC+2 (CEST)

Gračanica is a neighborhood in the municipality of Živinice, Bosnia and Herzegovina.

== Demographics ==
In 2025, its approximate population was 2,146.

Approximate Ethnicity in 2025
Ethnicity	Number	Percentage
Bosniaks	2,129	99.5%
Americans	6	0.28%
Serbs	2	0.1%
other/undeclared	9	0.4%
Total	2,146	100%
