= Opara, Novi Travnik =

Opara
- Village
- Location within Bosnia and Herzegovina
- Coordinates: 44.0966984°N 17.6314425°E
- Country: Bosnia and Herzegovina
- Entity: Federation of Bosnia and Herzegovina
- Canton: Central Bosnia
- Municipality: Novi Travnik

Area
  - Total: 4.00 sq mi (10.35 km^{2})

Population (2013)
  - Total: 217
  - Density: 54.3/sq mi (21.0/km^{2})
- Time zone: UTC+1 (CET)
  - Summer (DST): UTC+2 (CEST)

Opara is a village in the municipality of Novi Travnik, Bosnia and Herzegovina.

== Demographics ==
According to the 2013 census, its population was 217.

Ethnicity in 2013
Ethnicity	Number	Percentage
Bosniaks	213	98.2%
other/undeclared	4	1.8%
Total	217	100%
