= Gornji Potočari =

Gornji Potočari Горњи Поточари
- Village
- Location within Bosnia and Herzegovina
- Coordinates: 44°09′13.23″N 19°16′41.47″E
- Country: Bosnia and Herzegovina
- Entity: Republika Srpska
- Municipality: Srebrenica

Area
  - Total: 4.21 km^{2} (1.63 sq mi)
- Elevation: 294 m (965 ft)

Population (2013)
  - Total: 263
  - Density: 62.5/km^{2} (162/sq mi)
- Time zone: UTC+1 (CET)
  - Summer (DST): UTC+2 (CEST)

Gornji Potočari (Serbian Cyrillic: Горњи Поточари) is a village located in the municipality of Srebrenica, Republika Srpska, Bosnia and Herzegovina. As of 2013 census, it has a population of 263 inhabitants.

== Demographics ==
As of 1991 census, it had a population of 896 inhabitants, all Bosniaks. As of 2013 census, the village has a population of 263 inhabitants, of whom 261 (98.8%) were Bosniaks and 2 others.
