= Bužim =

Town and municipality in Bosnia and Herzegovina

- Town and municipality
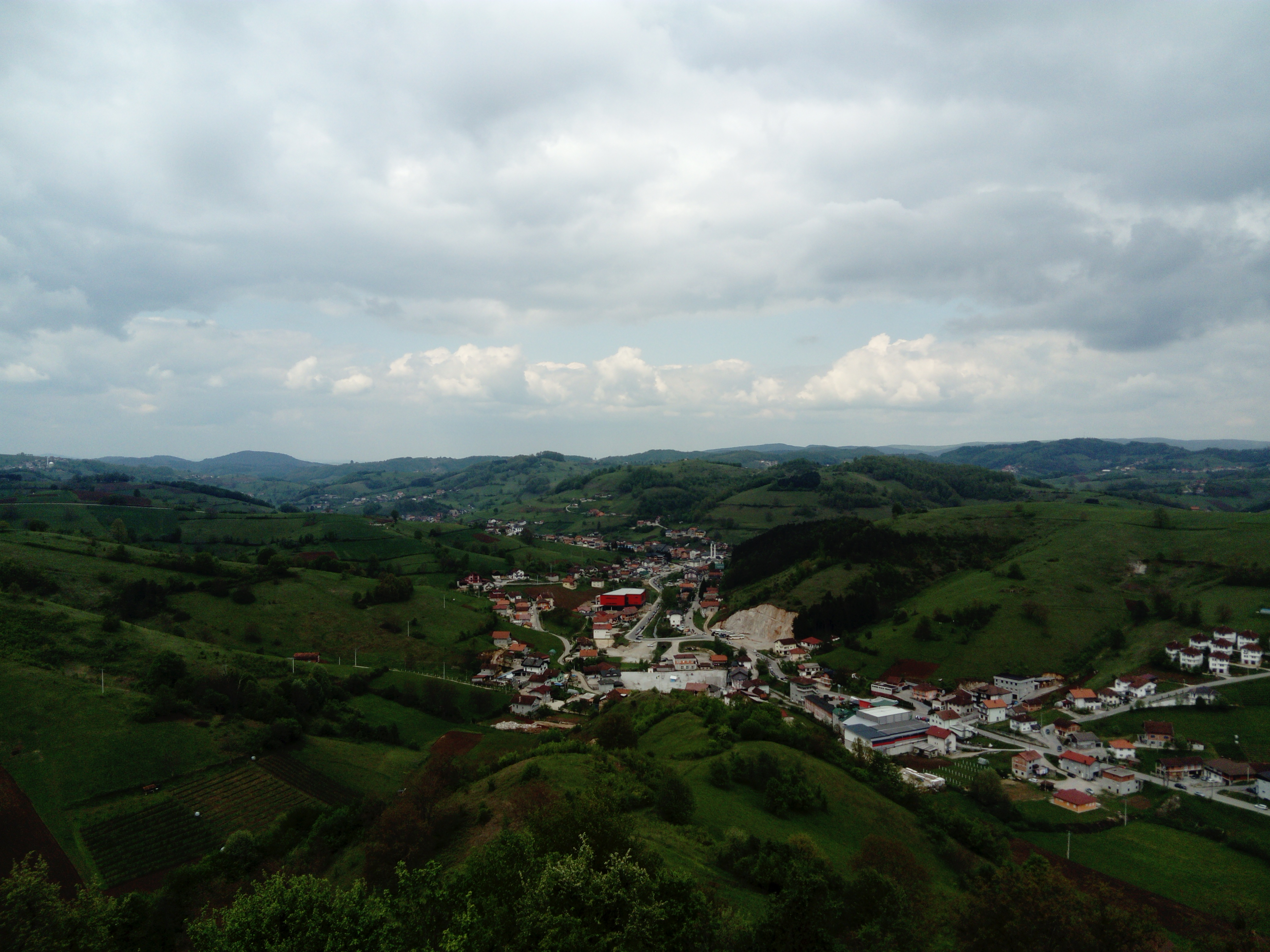
- Bužim

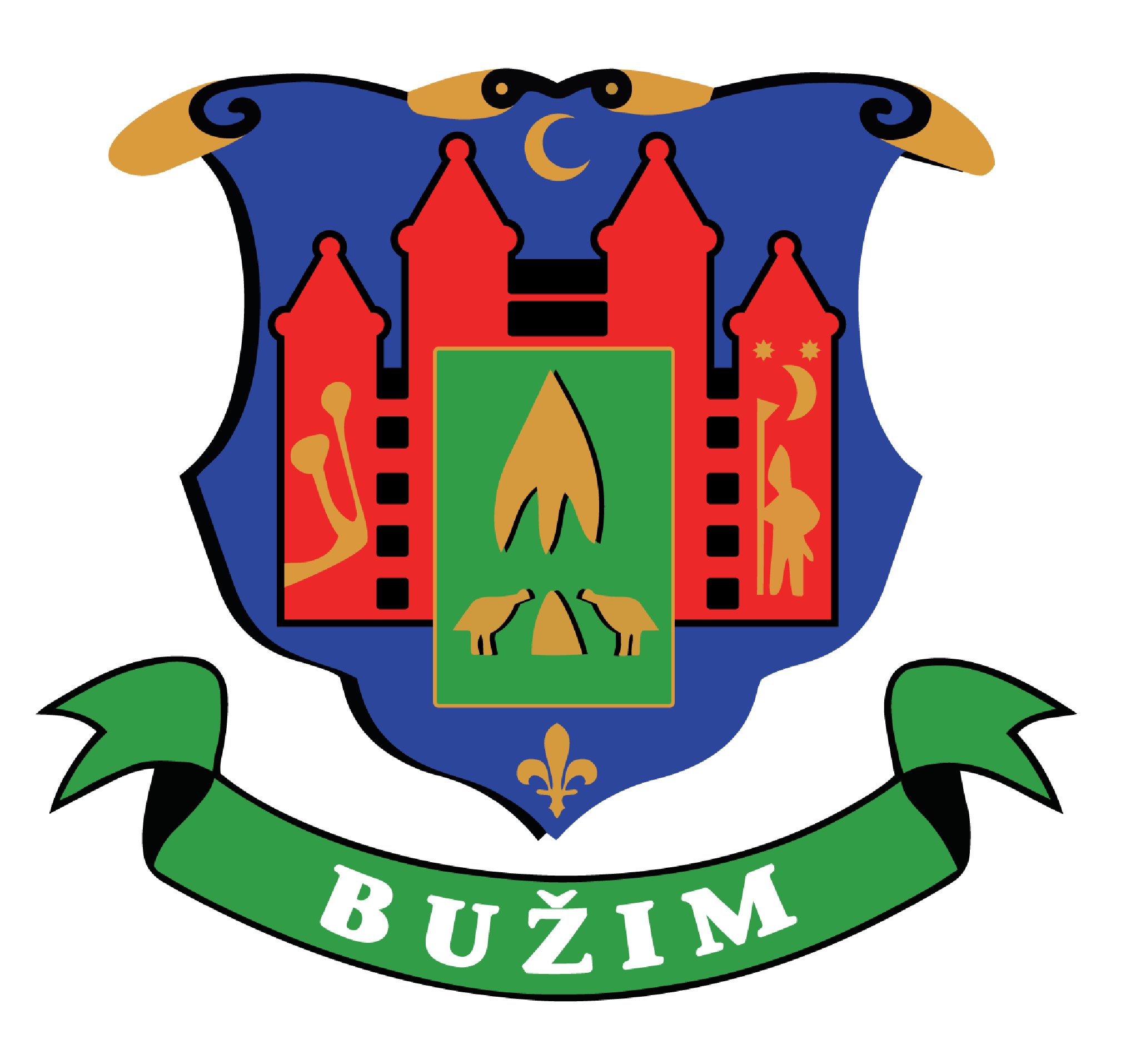
- Flag Coat of arms

- Location of Bužim within Bosnia and Herzegovina.
- Interactive map of Bužim
- Coordinates: 45°03′N 16°02′E
- Country: Bosnia and Herzegovina
- Entity: Federation of Bosnia and Herzegovina
- Canton: Una-Sana
- Geographical region: Bosanska Krajina

Government
  - Municipal mayor: Mersudin Nanić (SDA)

Area
  - Town and municipality: 129 km^{2} (50 sq mi)

Population (2013 census)
  - Town and municipality: 19,340
  - Density: 157.3/km^{2} (407/sq mi)
  - Urban: 2,191
- Time zone: UTC+1 (CET)
  - Summer (DST): UTC+2 (CEST)
- Area code: +387 37
- Website: www.opcinabuzim.ba

Bužim (Serbian Cyrillic: Бужим) is a town and municipality located in the Una-Sana Canton of the Federation of Bosnia and Herzegovina, an entity of Bosnia and Herzegovina. It is situated in the Bosanska Krajina in the most northwestern part of Bosnia and Herzegovina.

== Geography ==
Bužim borders Bosanska Krupa to the east, Cazin to the south, Velika Kladuša to the west and north, and the Republic of Croatia to the northeast. Geographically most of the municipality is mountainous. The total land area of Bužim is about 129 km^{2} (50 sq mi) with a population of 20,000. Bužim is about 180–400 meters above sea-level.

== History ==
The area of the Bužim municipality was inhabited before the arrival of the Romans. The population of this area was engaged in agriculture, cattle breeding, mining and trade. The existence of a mint in the 14th century indicates that trade was developed during those times. Bužim was the center of trade in the region even after the Ottoman conquest.

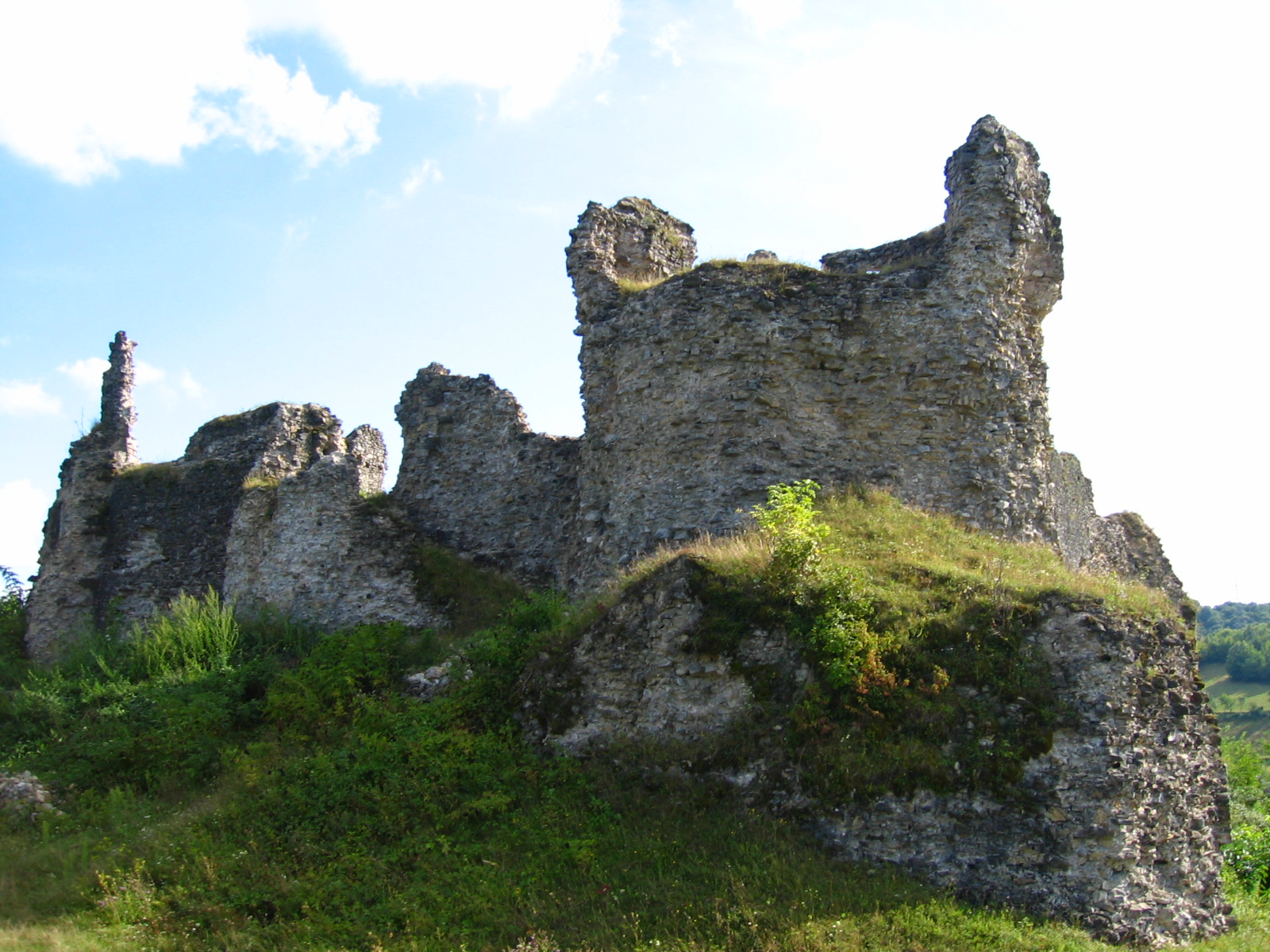
Bužim Castle

The town is dominated by the ruins of the medieval Croatian fortress and the old town. The older, inner part of the Bužim Castle was built no later than the first half of the 14th century and was first mentioned in 1334, along with the town itself. The fortress was expanded in 1484 and subsequently renovated several times. In 1494, King Vladislaus II of Hungary granted Bužim Castle and its associated lands to Johannes Keglewyth de Porichane, from the later Croatian-Hungarian comital Keglević family, which derived its name Keglevich de Buzin from this fortress. Croatia had been in a state union with Hungary since 1102. The castle played a crucial role in the defense of the Croatian border region against Ottoman attacks and was, for a time, the ancestral seat of the Croatian noble family Jelačić, whose most famous member – Josip Jelačić – is considered a national hero in Croatia. The Ottomans conquered it in 1576.

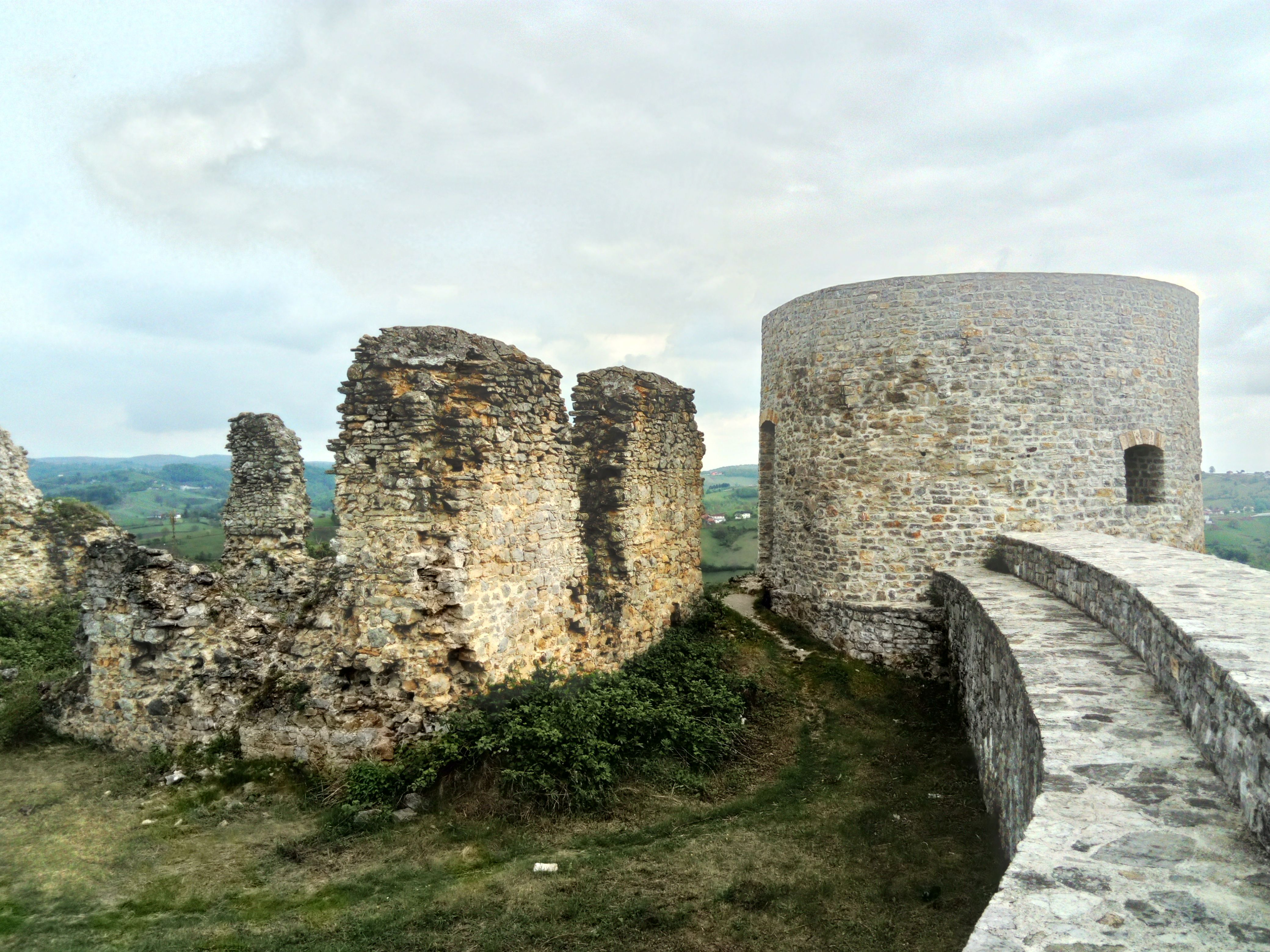
Bužim Castle

Before the Bosnian War, the town of Bužim was officially part of the Bosanska Krupa municipality. In 1996 Bužim became a municipality itself. The town was defended by the Army of the Republic of Bosnia and Herzegovina during the War in Bosnia and Herzegovina. One of the most elite and well known brigades of the Army of the Republic of Bosnia and Herzegovina, the 505th Brigade, was formed and based in Bužim.

Due to so many twins being born in Bužim, there is an effort to declare it the "Town of Twins".

== Demographics ==
=== Population ===
Population of settlements – Bužim municipality
	Settlement	1971.	1981.	1991.	2013.
	Total	12,579	15,413	16,940	19,340
1	Bag			644	571
2	Bužim	1,312	1,550	1,697	2,191
3	Dobro Selo			1,752	2,242
4	Konjodor			1,762	2,085
5	Lubarda			2,944	3,198
6	Mrazovac			3,149	3,653
7	Varoška Rijeka			4,992	5,400

=== Ethnic composition ===
Ethnic composition – Bužim town
	2013.	1991.	1981.	1971.
Total	2,191 (100,0%)	1,697 (100,0%)	1,550 (100,0%)	1,312 (100,0%)
Bosniaks	2,181 (99,54%)	1,643 (96,82%)	1,468 (94,71%)	1,275 (97,18%)
Unknown	4 (0,183%)			
Serbs	2 (0,091%)	20 (1,179%)	20 (1,290%)	29 (2,210%)
Unaffiliated	2 (0,091%)			
Croats	1 (0,046%)	3 (0,177%)	7 (0,452%)	2 (0,152%)
Slovenes	1 (0,046%)			
Others		21 (1,237%)	18 (1,161%)	6 (0,457%)
Yugoslavs		10 (0,589%)	37 (2,387%)	

Ethnic composition – Bužim municipality
	2013.	1991.	1981.	1971.
Total	20,298 (100,0%)	16,940 (100,0%)	15,413 (100,0%)	12,579 (100,0%)
Bosniaks	19,298 (99,78%)	16,680 (98,47%)	15,091 (97,91%)	12,280 (97,62%)
Unknown	22 (0,114%)			
Croats	8 (0,041%)	5 (0,030%)	16 (0,104%)	18 (0,143%)
Unaffiliated	6 (0,031%)			
Slovenes	4 (0,021%)			
Serbs	2 (0,010%)	91 (0,537%)	124 (0,805%)	229 (1,820%)
Others		141 (0,832%)	63 (0,409%)	50 (0,397%)
Yugoslavs		23 (0,136%)	119 (0,772%)	2 (0,016%)

== See also ==
- Una-Sana Canton
- Bosanska Krajina
