= Zgošća Column =

Stećak in Bosnia and Herzegovina

Coordinates: 43°51′16.8″N 18°24′10.8″E

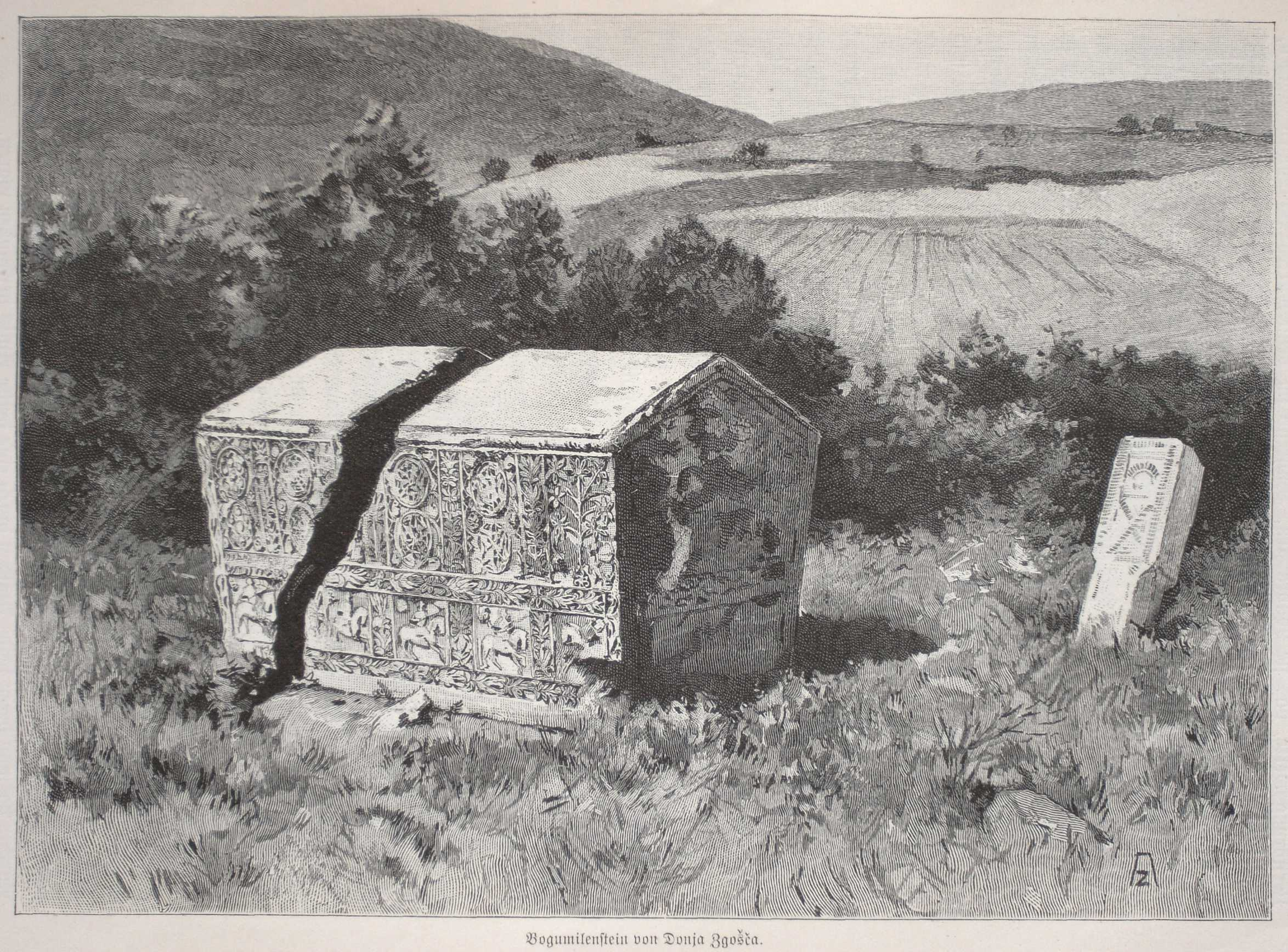
Crkvina Necropolis (Zgošća) 1901. On the right is the Column from Zgošća, partially sunken, on the left is the Zgošćan Stećak, then broken by vandals.

The Zgošća Column or Zgošćan Column, also Column from Zgošća (Serbo-Croatian: Zgošćanski uspravni stećak) is the only upright stećak tombstone from the medieval archaeological site of Crkvina Necropolis (Zgošća) in Donja Zgošća near Kakanj, Bosnia and Herzegovina.

This is a stećak (monumental medieval tombstone) discovered in a gorge of the Zgošća river, near Donja Zgošća village, not far from Kakanj in Bosnia and Herzegovina, on the site called Crkvina Necropolis, with several other stećaks of which most important one is called Zgošća Stećak. It is one of the most representative examples of stećak found in terms of its size, artistic processing and ornamentation. Both column and gable stećak dates back to the 15th century. The both stećaks are relocated from its original location to a botanical garden in the atrium of the National Museum of Bosnia and Herzegovina in Sarajevo, where it is kept and displayed for public view.

== Archaeology ==
The Zgošća necropolis was investigated by Đorđe Stratimirović, who first presented general information about the site in the 1891 Gazette of the National Museum. In addition to excavating the foundations of a small church on the plateau and the typological selection of the tombstones found, Stratimirović noted that five tombstones stand out in the necropolis:

- large gabled stećak;
- a column stećak, positioned in the central part of the necropolis, is the only upright stećak tombstone at this site that stands out for its height. Its facade (west side) faced the large gabled roof;
- two "twin" chest stećaks, closest to the church, in which, during later archaeological research by Irma Čremošnik and Lidija Fekeža-Martinović, remains of brocade fabric, two glass vessels, rings and silver buttons were found;
- distant gabled stećak.

Stratimirović also provided an analysis of two stećak tombstones – a large gabled one and a column. He dated the stećak tombstones to the second half of the 14th century, emphasizing that they were the work of a Dalmatian master. He attributed the column to a priest – a djed of the Bosnian Church, who was loyal during his lifetime to his lord, resting under the gabled one.

== Protection ==
Today, the pillar is located in the Botanical Garden of the National Museum of Bosnia and Herzegovina in Sarajevo, as part of a collection of 33 stone monuments from the Middle Ages. The Commission for the Preservation of National Monuments (KONS), at its session held on 26 June 2019, decided to declare the collection a National Monuments of Bosnia and Herzegovina.

== Description ==
The column is 246–247 cm high, and with its decoration at the top, which contains an epitaph, it stands out as a primary monument, the interpretation of which makes it possible to interpret the other monuments in the necropolis.

The lower part, the base and the “head” are in the shape of a four-sided prism, and the “body” is octagonal. This shape is original, and cannot be found in older finds. Đoko Mazalić linked it to nišan tombstones, supporting this with the fact that the shape of a four-sided prism and an octagonal body is typical of “Islamic architecture”, and that even more typical of this architecture is the way in which the transition from a square to an octagonal, or polygonal prism is made. This is the oblique cutting of the corners of a square, or a four-sided prism, where an octagonal or polygonal minaret is created by transitioning from its square base to a polygon.

=== Ornamentation ===
The column is richly decorated on all four sides in its lower part. On the north side, the decoration begins with a double spiral, continues with geometric shapes, a larger rosette, a single spiral, and a series of smaller rosettes – six examples. In the upper part, two parallel cross-springs turn into an arch, in the space between which are arranged four smaller and one larger rosette.

On the south side, in the upper part, there is a carved larger rosette on which a spring stands upright, while on the sides there are geometric motifs, the lower part is decorated with a twisted band that extends from the bottom to the top. The upper part of the eastern side of the pillar is decorated with a rosette, a circle and geometric motifs, with two fish, a table (table) and a chalice, while the lower part is without decoration.

The north side has a twisted band on the lower part, while a single spring and an arch are visible in the upper part. The bottom of the entire pillar is also richly decorated with geometric motifs, while the upper part is framed on all four sides by a twisted band.

=== Epitaph and its interpretations ===
The column, with its height and iconographic topographic setting in the form of a material "earthly" and spiritual "heavenly" sphere, at the top of which stands the "most important" epitaph, imposes itself as the primary monument that determines the hierarchical role of all the deceased.

The epitaph is located at the top of the column, on all four sides, written in Bosnian script. Over time, numerous authors have interpreted the text, starting with Ćiro Truhelka and Đorđe Stratimirović, but in different ways, with different interpretations of the content.

Šefik Bešlagić, based on the name Dragiša, connected the column with brother of Bosnian Grand Duke, Hrvoje Vukčić Hrvatinić, and a charter from 1392. That year, Hrvoje received a village in the župa of Trstivnica ("in the name of Kakanj"), so it is not impossible that he ceded that property to his brother Dragiša Vukčić, who lived and died there.

Đoko Mazalić connected the unusual and unique shape of the column with the nišan. He claimed, comparing it with the obelisks / nišan from Gornji Bakići near Olovo and Rogatica (the obelisks / nišan of Mahmut Branković and Radivoje Oprašić), that "the Zgošća 'obelisk' is also a nišan from the Turkish period", erected after 1463, i.e. at the turn of the 15th and 16th centuries. More precisely, "probably some chieftain of the Filurdžija (duke, prince, premićur)" who was a Christian was buried under the column.

Marian Wenzel, in her analysis of stećak tombstones, classifies the column from Zgošća as a group of stećak tombstones whose form changes under the influence of Islamic sepulchral art. In this sense, she assumes that the column was made somewhat earlier and that its contents are entirely Christian, and she associates the specific form with Islamic Mamluk stelae. Based on the shape of the letters of the remaining inscription (Dragiša), the monument dates to the time of King Ostoja, i.e. to 1401, and that it is the tombstone of Vuk or Vojislav Vukčić. That is the year in which the two of them appear for the last time in documentary diplomatic material.

The final analysis was provided by Ema Mazrak. Her transcript reads:

1st row) сʜє ʌ(єжʜ стѣпɑ)ɴ(ь) || (Бɑɴь Босьɴѣ) || ʜ Б(ρ)ɑть мɣ (Б)г(ом)д(ɑɴь) || ʜ дρɑгʜшɑ

2nd row) (κɴє)ʒ(ɑ) Бɑтɑʌɑ || (ʜ κɴє)ʒ(ɑ) ст(ɑɴьцɑ) || ʜ твρь(тκо)s || (с)дρɣжʜʌь

The top row of epitaphs refers to three deceased persons buried in this necropolis, the first two being brothers, and the third being Dragiša.

Mazrak was the first to read the names in the second row: Batalo, Stanko and Tvrtko,

Mazrak concludes that these monuments were erected posthumously by Tvrtko II to Ban Stjepan I Kotromanić and his brother Ban Prijezda II, his great-grandfather and his brother, as prominent figures of the Kotromanić dynasty, but in accordance with the taste and style that was present from the beginning of the 15th century. The witness was Batalo, a nobleman and a blacksmith from the royal court. It is not possible to determine the identity of Stanko.
