= Poljani =

Poljani may refer to:

- Poljani (Kakanj), a village in the municipality of Kakanj, Bosnia and Herzegovina
- Poljani, Kreševo, a village in the municipality of Kreševo, Bosnia and Herzegovina
- Poljani, Grubišno Polje, a village in the municipality of Grubišno Polje, Croatia
