= Kučići =

Kučići may refer to the following places in Bosnia and Herzegovina:

- Kučići (Kakanj)
- Kučići (Trebinje)
