= Danci =

Danci may refer to:

Places

- Danci, Bosnia and Herzegovina, a village near Kakanj
- Danci, Croatia, a village near Vižinada

People

- Cristian Danci (born 1988), Romanian footballer
