= Pavlovici =

Pavlovici is a Romanian surname that may refer to

- Cornel Pavlovici (1942–2013), Romanian football striker
- Dumitru Pavlovici (1912–1993), Romanian football goalkeeper
- Florin Pavlovici (1936–2021), Romanian writer and memoirist

== See also ==
- Pavlovići (Kakanj), a village in Bosnia and Herzegovina
