= Sopotnica =

Sopotnica may refer to:

In Bosnia and Herzegovina:

- Sopotnica (Novo Goražde), a village in the municipality of Novo Goražde
- Sopotnica (Kakanj), a village in the municipality of Kakanj

In North Macedonia:

- Sopotnica, Demir Hisar, a village in the municipality of Demir Hisar

In Serbia:

- Sopotnica (Gadžin Han), a village in the municipality of Gadžin Han
- Sopotnica (Prijepolje), a village in the municipality of Prijepolje

or:

- Sopotnica (river), a river near Prijepolje, a tributary of the Lim River

In Slovenia:

- Sopotnica, Škofja Loka, a settlement in the Municipality of Škofja Loka
