= Vukanovići (Kakanj) =

Village in Kakanj, Bosnia and Herzegovina

Vukanovići Вукановићи
- Village
- Location within Bosnia and Herzegovina
- Coordinates: 44°12′N 18°10′E
- Country: Bosnia and Herzegovina
- Entity: Federation of Bosnia and Herzegovina
- Canton: Zenica-Doboj
- Municipality: Kakanj

Area
  - Total: 13.32 sq mi (34.50 km^{2})

Population (2013)
  - Total: 218
  - Density: 16.4/sq mi (6.32/km^{2})
- Time zone: UTC+1 (CET)
  - Summer (DST): UTC+2 (CEST)

Vukanovići (Cyrillic: Вукановићи) is a village in the municipality of Kakanj, Bosnia and Herzegovina.

== Demographics ==
According to the 2013 census, its population was 218.

Ethnicity in 2013
| Ethnicity | Number | Percentage |
|---|---|---|
| Croats | 198 | 90.8% |
| Bosniaks | 13 | 6.0% |
| Serbs | 1 | 0.5% |
| other/undeclared | 6 | 2.8% |
| Total | 218 | 100% |
