= Zgošća Stećak =

Stećak in Bosnia and Herzegovina

Coordinates: 43.854659352063535°N 18.403043738882083°E

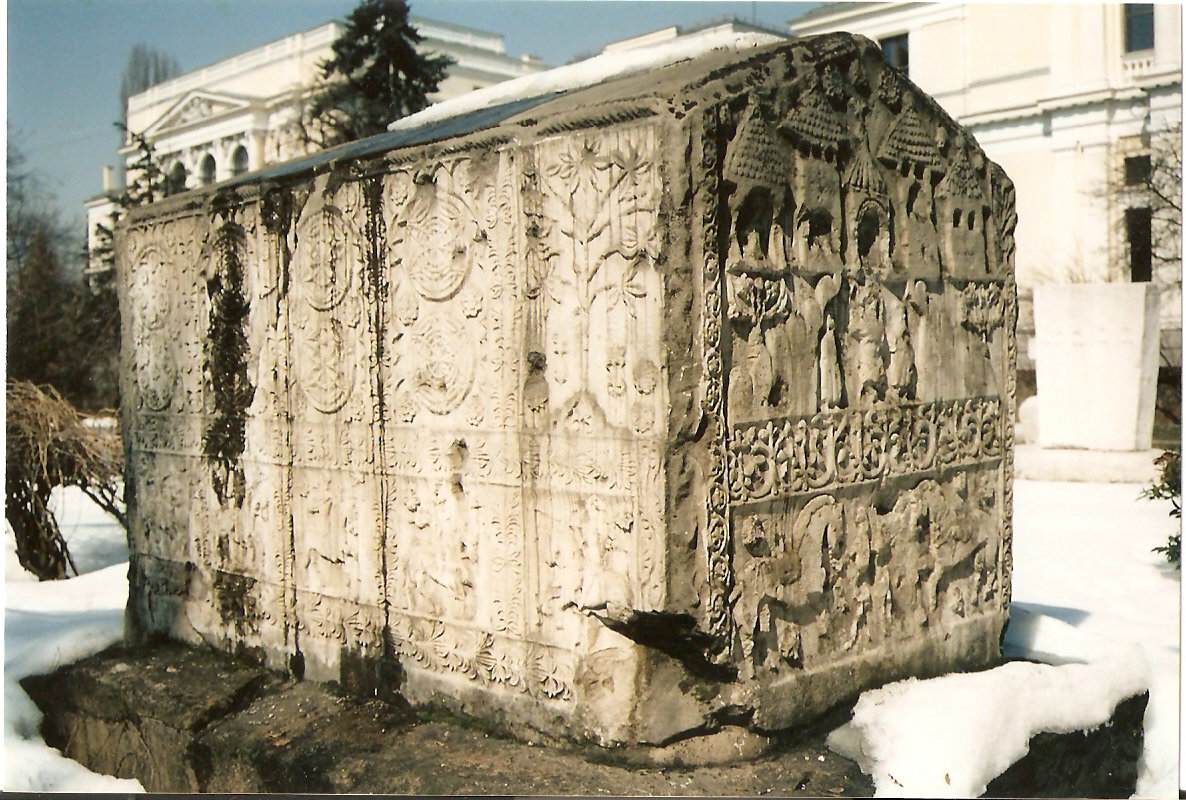
Zgošća Stećak on display in National Museum of Bosnia and Herzegovina, in Sarajevo, relocated from its original location in the Zgošća river gorge near Kakanj (front (east) and side (south) view)

Zgošća Stećak (Serbo-Croatian: Zgošćanski Stećak) is a stećak (monumental medieval tombstone) discovered in a gorge of the Zgošća river, near Donja Zgošća village, not far from Kakanj in Bosnia and Herzegovina. It is one of the most representative examples of stećak found in terms of its size, artistic processing and ornamentation. Along the Zgošća Stećak researchers found a stećak in the form of a column, colloquially known as Zgošća Column. Both column and gable stećak dates back to the 15th century. The stećak was relocated from its original location to a botanical garden in the atrium of the National Museum of Bosnia and Herzegovina in Sarajevo, where it is kept and displayed for public view.

== Background ==
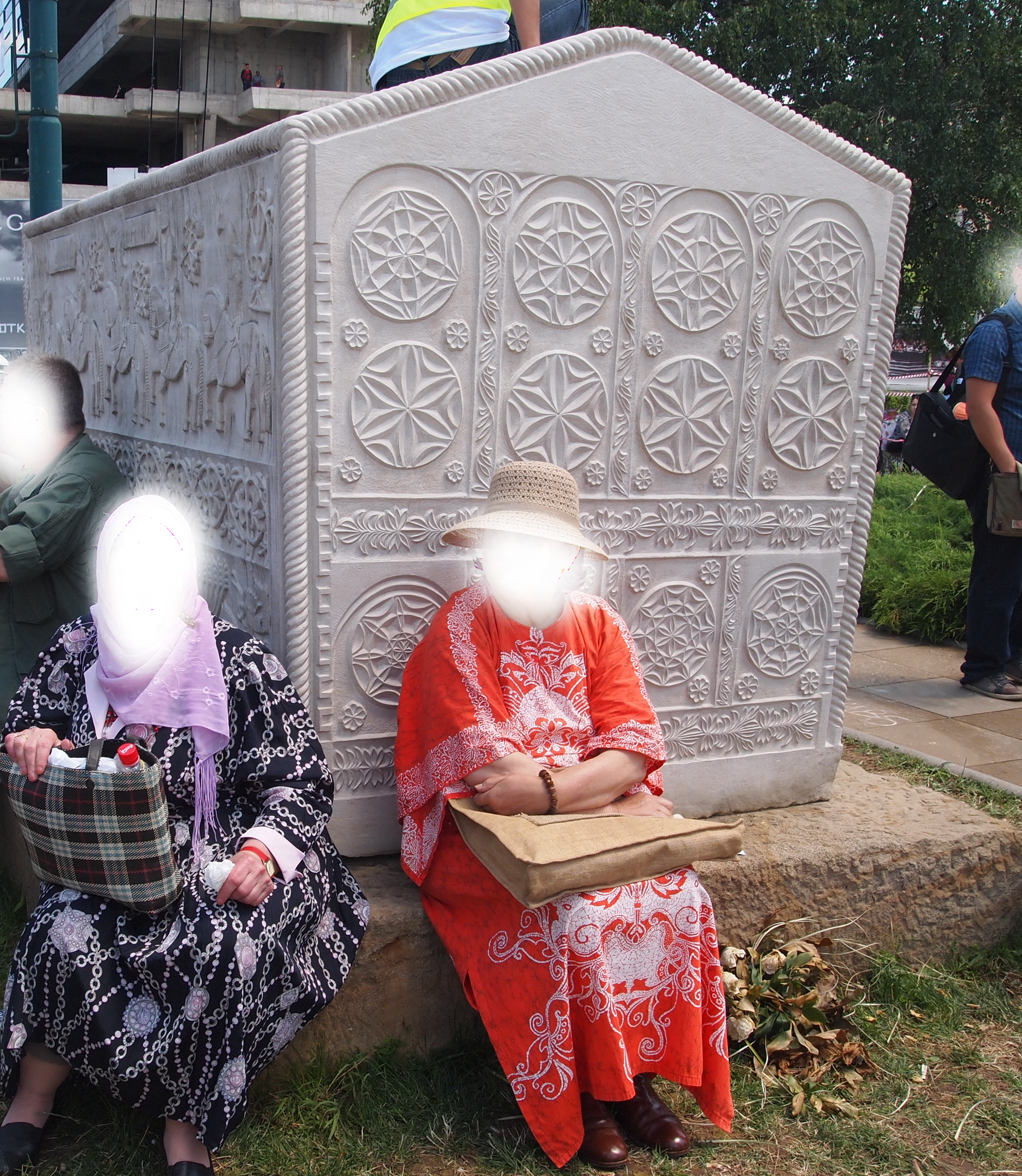
Zgošća Stećak replica placed on the Square of Bosnia and Herzegovina in front of the Parliamentary Assembly of Bosnia and Herzegovina.

It was found in the necropolis of Crkvina in Donja Zgošća near Kakanj, almost equidistant from the two royal residences, royal court in Sutjeska and royal fortress-town of Bobovac. The stećak was relocated to the National Museum of Bosnia and Herzegovina in 1913 together with a pillar from the same locality, after Ćiro Truhelka carried out an in-situ research.

Zgošća Stećak is one of the most representative examples of stećak found in terms of its size, artistic processing and ornamentation.

== Conservation ==
It is kept in a museum's botanical garden in the atrium of the building. Conservation works were carried out during the period of Austro-Hungarian administration in Bosnia and Herzegovina, then after the Second World War. The reconstruction of the damaged parts, as well as the assembly of the broken gable-shaped megalith, was done provisorily with ordinary cement mortar. For the last 15 to 20 years, the stećak was only maintained by washing. It is still unprotected and exposed to elements and constant decay.

A replica of the Zgošća Stećak was also made, which was placed on Square of Bosnia and Herzegovina in front of the building of the Parliamentary Assembly of BiH and the Council of Ministers of BiH, and a replica of the Zgošćan column, which was placed in the central city centre of Kakanj. Multidisciplinary research at the Donja Zgošća site was carried out in 2011 and at the beginning of 2012.

Today, the stećak is held in the Botanical Garden of the National Museum of Bosnia and Herzegovina in Sarajevo, as part of a collection of 33 stećaks, stone monuments from the Middle Ages. The Commission for the Preservation of National Monuments, at the session held on June 26, 2019, decided to declare the National Museum collection of stećaks a National Monument of Bosnia and Herzegovina.

== Description ==
The dimensions of the stećak with a slab are: the gable-shaped sarcophagus 248 cm x 136 cm x 142 cm, slab 310 cm x 204 cm x 34 cm. The weight is about 14 tons.

The richness of the decoration of the stećak is reflected on all four sides of the gable, ornamented with human and animal figures, plant and geometric ornamentation and architectural motifs.

Most decorated is the eastern front side of the monument, which is extremely artistically interesting. It is divided into three horizontal zones, and in between the first and second zone, which is lower to the ground, there is a strip with floral motifs that alternate rhythmically. Thus, the two upper zones are visually connected and separated from the lower zone by their content.

The upper zone shows a city with a gate on a steep rock, two high towers next to it, and two smaller towers at the corners. In front of the city sits a person on a throne, with two people standing to the left and right. On one of the towers, a person sits on an open balcony and looks out. In the lower zone, two grooms are shown, who have saddled their horses, ready for the gentlemen to mount them.

The northern side is in the form of plant stylization, divided into two parts by a wide horizontal band: in the upper part, five knights on horses are shown, riding one after the other towards the eastern front. The knights are in armour and have a helmet with a crown, and a spear in their right hand.

The western front side of the monument is in the form of plant stylization, divided into two parts by a horizontal narrow strip, as is the northern side. In the upper part, four arcades are shown, in which four reels are shown in two rows with six leaves in the reel. In the lower part, four reels are shown, and in the interior, a six-leaf is shown. The area around the reel is decorated with smaller flowers, 28 of them.

On the southern side, there is an identical division into two fields. In the upper field there are eight rosettes and the Tree of Life, and in the lower five horsemen with pointed spears. Four knights are facing the east side of the front, and the fifth is facing the west front side, i.e. towards the first four knights.

== Interpretations ==
Historian Đorđe Stratimirović (archaeologist) in the Gazette of the National Museum, XXXVIII from 1926, claimed that the stećak is a tombstone on the grave of Stjepan II Kotromanić who died in 1353. Stratimirović believed that the four human figures on the facade belong to ban Stjepan, his wife and daughter Elizabeth married to the Hungarian king Luis I, and ban's nephew and heir Tvrtko I. He based his claim on two plaques with an inscription. Today the tiles are not in the museum.

Ćiro Truhelka attributed it to Ban Prijezda.

The most accurate description of this stećak is given by Šefik Bešlagić in his monograph on the stećaks of central Bosnia (1967), but without any explanations or interpretations.

Marian Wenzel (1999) points out that Vuk Vukčić or Vojislav Hrvatinić could be buried under the column, both of whom disappear from written sources in 1401, and she based this on the ductus of letters from documents and carvings created around 1400 from the time of King Ostoja, which coincide with the inscription on the column. According to her interpretation, then it would be possible that the gabled stećak was the tombstone of no other than Grand Duke of Bosnia, Hrvoje Vukčić Hrvatinić.

Dubravko Lovrenović thought that there is no evidence for claims of belonging to any person but agrees that the four human figures represent members of one of the feudal families of medieval Bosnia.

Ema Mazrak looks back at all previous research and interpretations of the artistic repertoire of the stećak, and presents the interpretations of the iconographic and artistic analysis of the gables as a whole. The detailed analysis refers to the symbolism of the religious motifs of the book of Revelation and is based on the medieval manuscripts of Bosnia and the illuminations of the Hval manuscript, the Radosavljeva bosanska knjiga, the Nikoljskog evanđelja (Gospel of Nicholas) and the Apostle of Giljferding. Her conclusion is:

- the gable is dedicated to two high-ranking Bosnian lords, who are related by blood, with the fact that one of them was of a higher social rank.
- by analyzing the rosettes, which have six leaves, the gable stone could belong to someone from the Kotromanić dynasty or someone very close to them. The following facts support this:
  - certain issues of money of Ban Stjepan II. A six-leaved rosette appears in Kotromanić's shield as a coat of arms,
  - among the archaeological findings from the Church of Saint Nicholas of the "Little Brother" in Mile near Visoko (the tomb of Kotromanić) is a signet ring with a six-leaf rosette,
  - the six-leaf clover is found on some of the seals of King Tvrtko I and Tvrtko II.
- stećak is from the second half of the 14th and the beginning of the 15th century based on the types of weapons, clothing, helmets and the way of performance,
- the artistic presentation of the gable came from the bosoms of the Bosnian Church (Christ the Judge, Heavenly Jerusalem)
- the stećak is certainly the work of one artist

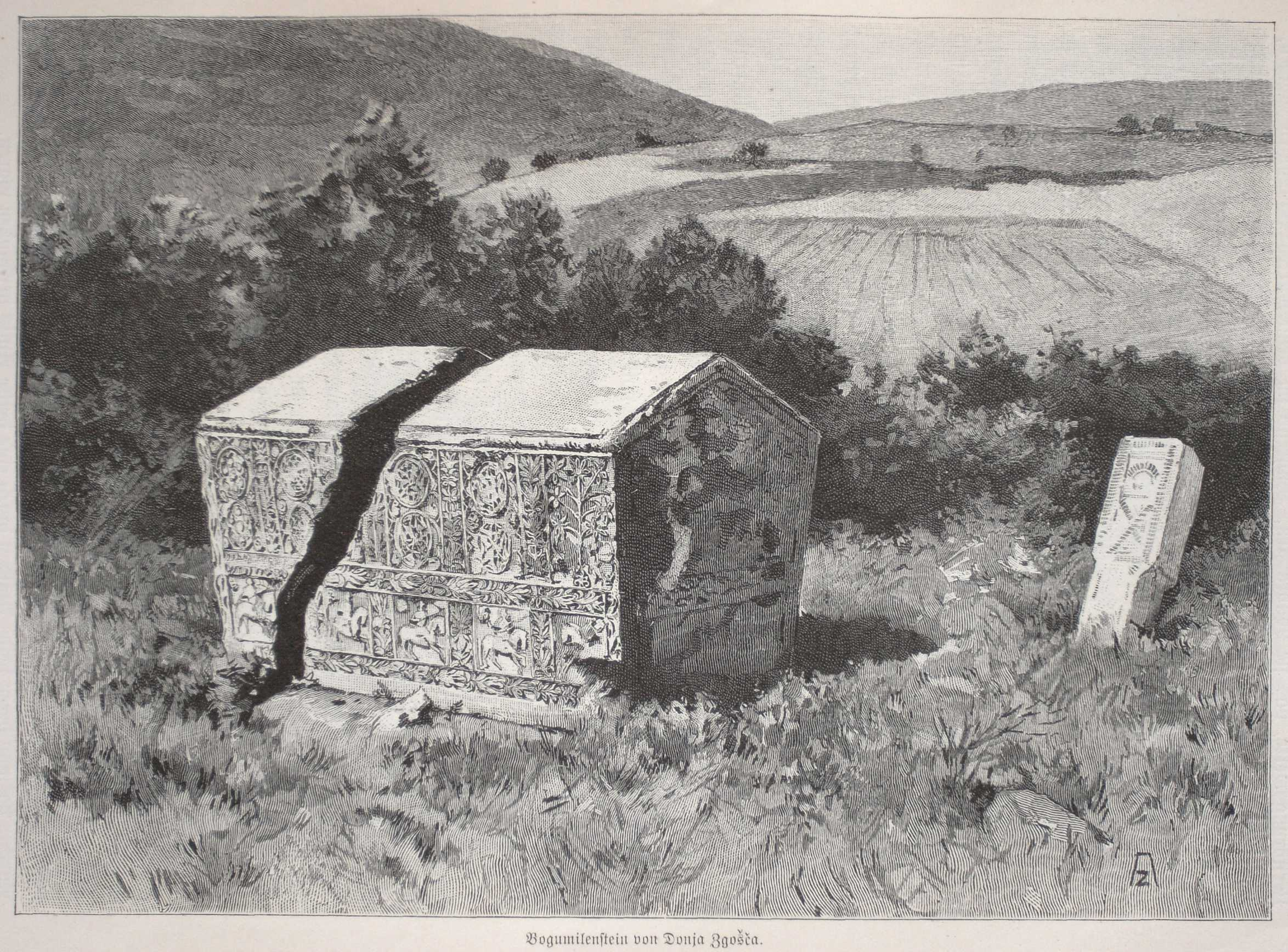
Necropolis of Crkvina (Zgošća) in 1901. To the right is the Zgošća Column, mostly sunk, to the left is the Zgošća Stećak, at the time broken by vandals in search of valuables.

=== Zgošća Stećak and Zgošća Pillar ===
The last comprehensive analysis of the Zgošća Stećak was done by Ema Mazrak in 2021. Her opinion is that a credible interpretation of this stećak must be based on the condition before they were moved to the National Museum and:

- how the stećaks were grouped in the Crkvini necropolis in relation to the church
- how they were oriented

In this sense, the author states that the column is positioned in the central part of the necropolis. This data is very important for further analysis for two reasons: 1. It is the only upright stećak in this locality that stands out due to its height; 2. In its top there is an epitaph on all four sides. The large gable (Zgošća Stećak) had its facade facing the church, and the column had its facade (west side) facing the gable. With its height and iconographic topographic setting in the form of a material "earthly" and a spiritual "heavenly" sphere, at the top of which stands the "most important" epitaph, the column imposes itself as a primary monument that determines the hierarchical role of all the deceased.

The transcript of Ema Mazrak for the epitaph on the column, based on the results of research by Ćiro Truhelka and Lejla Nakaš, reads as follows:

сʜє ʌ(єжʜ стѣпɑ)ɴ(ь) (Бɑɴь Босьɴѣ) ʜ Б(ρ)ɑть мɣ (Б)г(ом)д(ɑɴь) ʜ дρɑгʜшɑ

2nd row

(κɴє)ʒ(ɑ) Бɑтɑʌɑ (ʜ κɴє)ʒ(ɑ) ст(ɑɴьцɑ) ʜ твρь(тκо)s (с)дρɣжʜʌь

She concludes that these monuments were posthumously erected by Tvrtko II to ban Stjepan I. Kotromanić and his brother ban Prijezda II, his great-grandfather and his brother, as prominent figures of the Kotromanić dynasty, but in accordance weith th taste and style that was present from the beginning of the 15th century. The witness was Batalo, a lord and tepčija from the royal court. Stanko's identity cannot be determined.

== Bibliography ==
- Ema Mazrak - Stećak sljemenjak iz Donje Zgošće kod Kaknja – novo ikonografsko tumačenje - Katedra za historiju i teoriju umjetnosti, Akademija likovnih umjetnosti, Sarajevo [Stećak gable-shaped from Donja Zgošća near Kakanj - a new iconographic interpretation - Department of History and Theory of Art, Academy of Fine Arts, Sarajevo]
