= Groce =

Groce is a surname. Notable people with the surname include:

- Cari Groce, American tennis player and coach
- Cherry Groce, shot by London police, sparking the 1985 Brixton riot
- Clif Groce (born 1972), American football player
- DeJuan Groce (born 1980), American football player
- John Groce (born 1971), American college basketball coach
- Larry Groce (born 1948), American singer-songwriter and radio host
- Michael Groce (born 1963), reformed English poet and community worker
- Victoria Groce (born 1981), American quiz player and game show contestant

== See also ==
- Groce (Kakanj) is a village in the municipality of Kakanj, Bosnia and Herzegovina
- Gross (disambiguation)
