= Tršće =

Tršće may refer to:

- Tršće, Bosnia and Herzegovina, a village near Kakanj
- Tršće, Croatia, a village near Čabar
