= Hrastovac =

Hrastovac may refer to:

- Hrastovac, Bosnia and Herzegovina, village near Kakanj
- Hrastovac, Bjelovar-Bilogora County, village near Garešnica in Croatia
- Hrastovac, Osijek-Baranja County, village in the Vuka municipality in Croatia
