= Alagići (Kakanj) =

Village in Kakanj, Bosnia and Herzegovina

Alagići Алагићи
- Village
- Location within Bosnia and Herzegovina
- Coordinates: 44.1468°N 18.1232°E
- Country: Bosnia and Herzegovina
- Entity: Federation of Bosnia and Herzegovina
- Canton: Zenica-Doboj
- Municipality: Kakanj

Area
  - Total: 0.16 sq mi (0.41 km^{2})

Population (2013)
  - Total: 74
  - Density: 470/sq mi (180/km^{2})
- Time zone: UTC+1 (CET)
  - Summer (DST): UTC+2 (CEST)

Alagići (Cyrillic: Алагићи) is a village in the municipality of Kakanj, Bosnia and Herzegovina.

== Demographics ==
According to the 2013 census, its population was 74, all Bosniaks.
