= Turalići (Kakanj) =

Village in Kakanj, Bosnia and Herzegovina

Turalići Туралићи
- Village
- Location within Bosnia and Herzegovina
- Coordinates: 44°14′36″N 18°05′33″E
- Country: Bosnia and Herzegovina
- Entity: Federation of Bosnia and Herzegovina
- Canton: Zenica-Doboj
- Municipality: Kakanj

Area
  - Total: 0.64 sq mi (1.67 km^{2})

Population (2013)
  - Total: 222
  - Density: 344/sq mi (133/km^{2})
- Time zone: UTC+1 (CET)
  - Summer (DST): UTC+2 (CEST)

Turalići (Cyrillic: Туралићи) is a village in the municipality of Kakanj, Bosnia and Herzegovina.

== Demographics ==
According to the 2013 census, its population was 222, all Bosniaks.
