= Modrinje =

Village in Kakanj, Bosnia and Herzegovina

Modrinje Модриње
- Village
- Location within Bosnia and Herzegovina
- Coordinates: 44°08′N 18°01′E
- Country: Bosnia and Herzegovina
- Entity: Federation of Bosnia and Herzegovina
- Canton: Zenica-Doboj
- Municipality: Kakanj

Area
  - Total: 1.97 sq mi (5.11 km^{2})

Population (2013)
  - Total: 473
  - Density: 240/sq mi (92.6/km^{2})
- Time zone: UTC+1 (CET)
  - Summer (DST): UTC+2 (CEST)

Modrinje (Cyrillic: Модриње) is a village in the municipality of Kakanj, Bosnia and Herzegovina.

== Demographics ==
According to the 2013 census, its population was 473.

Ethnicity in 2013
Ethnicity	Number	Percentage
Bosniaks	466	98.5%
Serbs	6	1.3%
other/undeclared	1	0.2%
Total	473	100%
