= Subotinje =

Village in Kakanj, Bosnia and Herzegovina

Subotinje Суботиње
- Village
- Location within Bosnia and Herzegovina
- Coordinates: 44°10′N 18°04′E
- Country: Bosnia and Herzegovina
- Entity: Federation of Bosnia and Herzegovina
- Canton: Zenica-Doboj
- Municipality: Kakanj

Area
  - Total: 1.39 sq mi (3.61 km^{2})

Population (2013)
  - Total: 67
  - Density: 48/sq mi (19/km^{2})
- Time zone: UTC+1 (CET)
  - Summer (DST): UTC+2 (CEST)

Subotinje (Cyrillic: Суботиње) is a village in the municipality of Kakanj, Bosnia and Herzegovina.

== Demographics ==
According to the 2013 census, its population was 67, all Bosniaks.
