= Podbjelavići =

Village in Kakanj, Bosnia and Herzegovina

Podbjelavići Подбјелавићи
- Village
- Location within Bosnia and Herzegovina
- Coordinates: 44°06′36″N 18°09′00″E
- Country: Bosnia and Herzegovina
- Entity: Federation of Bosnia and Herzegovina
- Canton: Zenica-Doboj
- Municipality: Kakanj

Area
  - Total: 0.19 sq mi (0.48 km^{2})

Population (2013)
  - Total: 361
  - Density: 1,900/sq mi (750/km^{2})
- Time zone: UTC+1 (CET)
  - Summer (DST): UTC+2 (CEST)

Podbjelavići (Cyrillic: Подбјелавићи) is a village in the municipality of Kakanj, Bosnia and Herzegovina.

== Demographics ==
According to the 2013 census, its population was 361.

Ethnicity in 2013
Ethnicity	Number	Percentage
Bosniaks	264	73.1%
Croats	85	23.5%
other/undeclared	12	3.3%
Total	361	100%
