= Pope (Kakanj) =

Village in Kakanj, Bosnia and Herzegovina

Pope Попе
- Village
- Location within Bosnia and Herzegovina
- Coordinates: 44°06′16″N 18°07′00″E
- Country: Bosnia and Herzegovina
- Entity: Federation of Bosnia and Herzegovina
- Canton: Zenica-Doboj
- Municipality: Kakanj

Area
  - Total: 0.61 sq mi (1.57 km^{2})

Population (2013)
  - Total: 950
  - Density: 1,600/sq mi (610/km^{2})
- Time zone: UTC+1 (CET)
  - Summer (DST): UTC+2 (CEST)

Pope (Cyrillic: Попе) is a village in the municipality of Kakanj, Bosnia and Herzegovina.

== Demographics ==
According to the 2013 census, its population was 950.

Ethnicity in 2013
| Ethnicity | Number | Percentage |
|---|---|---|
| Bosniaks | 924 | 97.3% |
| Croats | 23 | 2.4% |
| other/undeclared | 3 | 0.3% |
| Total | 950 | 100% |
