= Zgošća =

Village in Kakanj, Bosnia and Herzegovina

Zgošća Згошћа
- Village
- Location within Bosnia and Herzegovina
- Coordinates: 44°09′N 18°08′E
- Country: Bosnia and Herzegovina
- Entity: Federation of Bosnia and Herzegovina
- Canton: Zenica-Doboj
- Municipality: Kakanj

Area
  - Total: 0.99 sq mi (2.56 km^{2})

Population (2013)
  - Total: 825
  - Density: 835/sq mi (322/km^{2})
- Time zone: UTC+1 (CET)
  - Summer (DST): UTC+2 (CEST)

Zgošća (Serbian Cyrillic: Згошћа) is a village in the municipality of Kakanj, Bosnia and Herzegovina. Zgošća river runs through the area, on whose banks the Zgošća Stećak was found.

== Demographics ==
According to the 2013 census, its population was 825.

Ethnicity in 2013
Ethnicity	Number	Percentage
Bosniaks	794	96.2%
Croats	13	1.6%
Serbs	8	1.0%
other/undeclared	10	1.2%
Total	825	100%

== Notable residents ==
- Rudi Čajavec
