= Gradac, Kakanj =

Village in Kakanj, Bosnia and Herzegovina

Gradac Градац
- Village
- Location within Bosnia and Herzegovina
- Country: Bosnia and Herzegovina
- Entity: Federation of Bosnia and Herzegovina
- Canton: Zenica-Doboj
- Municipality: Kakanj

Area
  - Total: 0.11 sq mi (0.29 km^{2})

Population (2013)
  - Total: 20
  - Density: 180/sq mi (69/km^{2})
- Time zone: UTC+1 (CET)
  - Summer (DST): UTC+2 (CEST)

Gradac (Cyrillic: Градац) is a village in the municipality of Kakanj, Bosnia and Herzegovina.

== Demographics ==
According to the 2013 census, its population was 20, all Bosniaks.
