= Slapnica =

Village in Kakanj, Bosnia and Herzegovina

Slapnica Слапница
- Village
- Location within Bosnia and Herzegovina
- Coordinates: 44°05′N 18°09′E
- Country: Bosnia and Herzegovina
- Entity: Federation of Bosnia and Herzegovina
- Canton: Zenica-Doboj
- Municipality: Kakanj

Area
  - Total: 1.88 sq mi (4.87 km^{2})

Population (2013)
  - Total: 226
  - Density: 120/sq mi (46.4/km^{2})
- Time zone: UTC+1 (CET)
  - Summer (DST): UTC+2 (CEST)

Slapnica (Cyrillic: Слапница) is a village in the municipality of Kakanj, Bosnia and Herzegovina.

== Demographics ==
According to the 2013 census, its population was 226.

Ethnicity in 2013
Ethnicity	Number	Percentage
Bosniaks	217	96.0%
Croats	8	3.5%
other/undeclared	1	0.4%
Total	226	100%
