= Karaula (Kakanj) =

Village in Kakanj, Bosnia and Herzegovina

Karaula Караула
- Village
- Location within Bosnia and Herzegovina
- Coordinates: 44°07′55″N 18°05′31″E
- Country: Bosnia and Herzegovina
- Entity: Federation of Bosnia and Herzegovina
- Canton: Zenica-Doboj
- Municipality: Kakanj

Area
  - Total: 0.65 sq mi (1.69 km^{2})

Population (2013)
  - Total: 3
  - Density: 4.6/sq mi (1.8/km^{2})
- Time zone: UTC+1 (CET)
  - Summer (DST): UTC+2 (CEST)

Karaula (Cyrillic: Караула) was a village in the municipality of Kakanj, Bosnia and Herzegovina. It was destroyed entirely during the Balkan Wars.

== Demographics ==
According to the 2013 census, its population was 3, all Bosniaks.
