= Pedići =

Village in Kakanj, Bosnia and Herzegovina

Pedići Педићи
- Village
- Motto: Za svoju guzicu
- Location within Bosnia and Herzegovina
- Coordinates: 44°14′09″N 18°07′03″E
- Country: Bosnia and Herzegovina
- Entity: Federation of Bosnia and Herzegovina
- Canton: Zenica-Doboj
- Municipality: Kakanj

Government
  - Mayor: Ferid Delić

Area
  - Total: 2.37 sq mi (6.13 km^{2})

Population (2013)
  - Total: 302
  - Density: 128/sq mi (49.3/km^{2})
- Time zone: UTC+1 (CET)
  - Summer (DST): UTC+2 (CEST)
- Postal code: 77243

Pedići (Cyrillic: Педићи) is a village in the municipality of Kakanj, Bosnia and Herzegovina.

== Demographics ==
According to the 2013 census, its population was 302.

Ethnicity in 2013
Ethnicity	Number	Percentage
Bosniaks	298	98.7%
other/undeclared	4	1.3%
Total	302	100%
