= Marijina Voda =

Village in Kakanj, Bosnia and Herzegovina

Marijina Voda Маријина Вода
- Village
- Location within Bosnia and Herzegovina
- Coordinates: 44°06′00″N 18°10′48″E
- Country: Bosnia and Herzegovina
- Entity: Federation of Bosnia and Herzegovina
- Canton: Zenica-Doboj
- Municipality: Kakanj

Area
  - Total: 0.19 sq mi (0.48 km^{2})

Population (2013)
  - Total: 354
  - Density: 1,900/sq mi (740/km^{2})
- Time zone: UTC+1 (CET)
  - Summer (DST): UTC+2 (CEST)

Marijina Voda (Cyrillic: Маријина Вода) is a village in the municipality of Kakanj, Bosnia and Herzegovina.

== Demographics ==
According to the 2013 census, its population was 354.

Ethnicity in 2013
Ethnicity	Number	Percentage
Bosniaks	272	76.8%
Croats	78	22.0%
other/undeclared	4	1.1%
Total	354	100%
