= Bašići (Kakanj) =

Village in Kakanj, Bosnia and Herzegovina

Bašići Башићи
- Village
- Location within Bosnia and Herzegovina
- Coordinates: 44°13′59″N 18°06′35″E
- Country: Bosnia and Herzegovina
- Entity: Federation of Bosnia and Herzegovina
- Canton: Zenica-Doboj
- Municipality: Kakanj

Area
  - Total: 0.23 sq mi (0.59 km^{2})

Population (2013)
  - Total: 39
  - Density: 170/sq mi (66/km^{2})
- Time zone: UTC+1 (CET)
  - Summer (DST): UTC+2 (CEST)

Bašići (Cyrillic: Башићи) is a village in the municipality of Kakanj, Bosnia and Herzegovina.

== Demographics ==
According to the 2013 census, its population was 39, all Bosniaks.
