= Tičići =

Village in Kakanj, Bosnia and Herzegovina

Tičići Тичићи
- Village
- Location within Bosnia and Herzegovina
- Coordinates: 44°08′19″N 18°01′59″E
- Country: Bosnia and Herzegovina
- Entity: Federation of Bosnia and Herzegovina
- Canton: Zenica-Doboj
- Municipality: Kakanj

Area
  - Total: 2.84 sq mi (7.35 km^{2})

Population (2013)
  - Total: 717
  - Density: 253/sq mi (97.6/km^{2})
- Time zone: UTC+1 (CET)
  - Summer (DST): UTC+2 (CEST)

Tičići (Cyrillic: Тичићи) is a village in the municipality of Kakanj, Bosnia and Herzegovina.

== Demographics ==
According to the 2013 census, its population was 717.

Ethnicity in 2013
Ethnicity	Number	Percentage
Bosniaks	703	98.0%
Serbs	2	0.3%
other/undeclared	12	1.7%
Total	717	100%
