= Lukovo Brdo =

Village in Kakanj, Bosnia and Herzegovina

Lukovo Brdo Луково Брдо
- Village
- Location within Bosnia and Herzegovina
- Coordinates: 44°05′N 18°12′E
- Country: Bosnia and Herzegovina
- Entity: Federation of Bosnia and Herzegovina
- Canton: Zenica-Doboj
- Municipality: Kakanj

Area
  - Total: 0.35 sq mi (0.91 km^{2})

Population (2013)
  - Total: 49
  - Density: 140/sq mi (54/km^{2})
- Time zone: UTC+1 (CET)
  - Summer (DST): UTC+2 (CEST)

Lukovo Brdo (Cyrillic: Луково Брдо) is a village in the municipality of Kakanj, Bosnia and Herzegovina.

== Demographics ==
According to the 2013 census, its population was 49.

Ethnicity in 2013
Ethnicity	Number	Percentage
Bosniaks	38	77.6%
Croats	11	22.4%
Total	49	100%
