= Ribnica (Kakanj) =

Village in Kakanj, Bosnia and Herzegovina

Ribnica Рибница
- Village
- Location within Bosnia and Herzegovina
- Coordinates: 44°08′52″N 18°04′19″E
- Country: Bosnia and Herzegovina
- Entity: Federation of Bosnia and Herzegovina
- Canton: Zenica-Doboj
- Municipality: Kakanj

Area
  - Total: 0.90 sq mi (2.32 km^{2})

Population (2013)
  - Total: 18
  - Density: 20/sq mi (7.8/km^{2})
- Time zone: UTC+1 (CET)
  - Summer (DST): UTC+2 (CEST)

Ribnica (Cyrillic: Рибница) is a village in the municipality of Kakanj, Bosnia and Herzegovina.

== Demographics ==
According to the 2013 census, its population was 18, all Bosniaks.
