= Seoce (Kakanj) =

Village in Kakanj, Bosnia and Herzegovina

Seoce Сеоце
- Village
- Location within Bosnia and Herzegovina
- Coordinates: 44°05′23″N 18°10′35″E
- Country: Bosnia and Herzegovina
- Entity: Federation of Bosnia and Herzegovina
- Canton: Zenica-Doboj
- Municipality: Kakanj

Area
  - Total: 0.71 sq mi (1.84 km^{2})

Population (2013)
  - Total: 216
  - Density: 304/sq mi (117/km^{2})
- Time zone: UTC+1 (CET)
  - Summer (DST): UTC+2 (CEST)

Seoce (Cyrillic: Сеоце) is a village in the municipality of Kakanj, Bosnia and Herzegovina.

== Demographics ==
According to the 2013 census, its population was 216.

Ethnicity in 2013
Ethnicity	Number	Percentage
Bosniaks	108	50.0%
Croats	91	42.1%
other/undeclared	17	7.9%
Total	216	100%
