= Bijelo Polje, Kakanj =

Village in Kakanj, Bosnia and Herzegovina

Bijelo Polje Бијело Поље
- Village
- Location within Bosnia and Herzegovina
- Coordinates: 44°05′19″N 18°11′09″E
- Country: Bosnia and Herzegovina
- Entity: Federation of Bosnia and Herzegovina
- Canton: Zenica-Doboj
- Municipality: Kakanj

Area
  - Total: 0.71 sq mi (1.84 km^{2})

Population (2013)
  - Total: 92
  - Density: 130/sq mi (50/km^{2})
- Time zone: UTC+1 (CET)
  - Summer (DST): UTC+2 (CEST)

Bijelo Polje (Cyrillic: Бијело Поље) is a village in the municipality of Kakanj, Bosnia and Herzegovina. It is a small, quiet village with few residents. It is surrounded by nature and nearby villages and shows the simple rural lifestyle of central Bosnia.

== Demographics ==
According to the 2013 census, its population was 92.

Ethnicity in 2013
Ethnicity	Number	Percentage
Croats	50	54.3%
Bosniaks	36	39.1%
other/undeclared	6	6.5%
Total	92	100%
