= Veliki Trnovci =

Village in Kakanj, Bosnia and Herzegovina

Veliki Trnovci Велики Трновци
- Village
- Location within Bosnia and Herzegovina
- Coordinates: 44°06′N 18°13′E
- Country: Bosnia and Herzegovina
- Entity: Federation of Bosnia and Herzegovina
- Canton: Zenica-Doboj
- Municipality: Kakanj

Area
  - Total: 0.76 sq mi (1.98 km^{2})

Population (2013)
  - Total: 250
  - Density: 330/sq mi (130/km^{2})
- Time zone: UTC+1 (CET)
  - Summer (DST): UTC+2 (CEST)

Veliki Trnovci (Cyrillic: Велики Трновци) is a village in the municipality of Kakanj, Bosnia and Herzegovina.

== Demographics ==
According to the 2013 census, its population was 250.

Ethnicity in 2013
| Ethnicity | Number | Percentage |
|---|---|---|
| Bosniaks | 214 | 85.6% |
| Croats | 28 | 11.2% |
| other/undeclared | 8 | 3.2% |
| Total | 250 | 100% |
