= Bukovlje, Kakanj =

Village in Kakanj, Bosnia and Herzegovina

Bukovlje Буковље
- Village
- Location within Bosnia and Herzegovina
- Coordinates: 44°08′15″N 18°08′16″E
- Country: Bosnia and Herzegovina
- Entity: Federation of Bosnia and Herzegovina
- Canton: Zenica-Doboj
- Municipality: Kakanj

Area
  - Total: 2.09 sq mi (5.42 km^{2})

Population (2013)
  - Total: 809
  - Density: 387/sq mi (149/km^{2})
- Time zone: UTC+1 (CET)
  - Summer (DST): UTC+2 (CEST)

Bukovlje (Cyrillic: Буковље) is a village in the municipality of Kakanj, Bosnia and Herzegovina.

== Demographics ==
According to the 2013 census, its population was 809.

Ethnicity in 2013
Ethnicity	Number	Percentage
Bosniaks	776	95.9%
Croats	19	2.3%
other/undeclared	14	1.7%
Total	809	100%
