= Gornji Lučani =

Village in Kakanj, Bosnia and Herzegovina

Gornji Lučani Горњи Лучани
- Village
- Location within Bosnia and Herzegovina
- Coordinates: 44°08′N 17°59′E
- Country: Bosnia and Herzegovina
- Entity: Federation of Bosnia and Herzegovina
- Canton: Zenica-Doboj
- Municipality: Kakanj

Area
  - Total: 1.03 sq mi (2.66 km^{2})

Population (2013)
  - Total: 369
  - Density: 359/sq mi (139/km^{2})
- Time zone: UTC+1 (CET)
  - Summer (DST): UTC+2 (CEST)

Gornji Lučani (Cyrillic: Горњи Лучани) is a village in the municipality of Kakanj, Bosnia and Herzegovina.

== Demographics ==
According to the 2013 census, its population was 369.

Ethnicity in 2013
Ethnicity	Number	Percentage
Bosniaks	368	99.7%
Croats	1	0.3%
Total	369	100%
