= Zlokuće (Kakanj) =

Village in Kakanj, Bosnia and Herzegovina

Zlokuće Злокуће
- Village
- Location within Bosnia and Herzegovina
- Coordinates: 44°12′00″N 18°10′27″E
- Country: Bosnia and Herzegovina
- Entity: Federation of Bosnia and Herzegovina
- Canton: Zenica-Doboj
- Municipality: Kakanj

Area
  - Total: 1.75 sq mi (4.53 km^{2})

Population (2013)
  - Total: 2
  - Density: 1.1/sq mi (0.44/km^{2})
- Time zone: UTC+1 (CET)
  - Summer (DST): UTC+2 (CEST)

Zlokuće (Cyrillic: Злокуће) is a village in the municipality of Kakanj, Bosnia and Herzegovina.

== Demographics ==
According to the 2013 census, its population was 2, both Bosniaks.
