= Bijele Vode (Kakanj) =

Village in Kakanj, Bosnia and Herzegovina

Bijele Vode Бијеле Воде
- Village
- Location within Bosnia and Herzegovina
- Country: Bosnia and Herzegovina
- Entity: Federation of Bosnia and Herzegovina
- Canton: Zenica-Doboj
- Municipality: Kakanj

Area
  - Total: 2.41 sq mi (6.23 km^{2})

Population (2013)
  - Total: 161
  - Density: 66.9/sq mi (25.8/km^{2})
- Time zone: UTC+1 (CET)
  - Summer (DST): UTC+2 (CEST)

Bijele Vode (Cyrillic: Бијеле Воде) is a village in the municipality of Kakanj, Bosnia and Herzegovina.

== Demographics ==
According to the 2013 census, its population was 161.

Ethnicity in 2013
Ethnicity	Number	Percentage
Bosniaks	160	99.4%
other/undeclared	1	0.6%
Total	161	100%
