= Varalići =

Village in Kakanj, Bosnia and Herzegovina

Varalići Варалићи
- Village
- Location within Bosnia and Herzegovina
- Coordinates: 44°15′N 18°06′E
- Country: Bosnia and Herzegovina
- Entity: Federation of Bosnia and Herzegovina
- Canton: Zenica-Doboj
- Municipality: Kakanj

Area
  - Total: 3.01 sq mi (7.80 km^{2})

Population (2013)
  - Total: 485
  - Density: 161/sq mi (62.2/km^{2})
- Time zone: UTC+1 (CET)
  - Summer (DST): UTC+2 (CEST)

Varalići (Cyrillic: Варалићи) is a village in the municipality of Kakanj, Bosnia and Herzegovina.

== Demographics ==
According to the 2013 census, its population was 485, all Bosniaks.
