= Gora (Kakanj) =

Village in Kakanj, Bosnia and Herzegovina

Gora Гора
- Village
- Location within Bosnia and Herzegovina
- Coordinates: 44.071791°N 18.120888°E
- Country: Bosnia and Herzegovina
- Entity: Federation of Bosnia and Herzegovina
- Canton: Zenica-Doboj
- Municipality: Kakanj

Area
  - Total: 1.47 sq mi (3.82 km^{2})

Population (2013)
  - Total: 248
  - Density: 168/sq mi (64.9/km^{2})
- Time zone: UTC+1 (CET)
  - Summer (DST): UTC+2 (CEST)

Gora (Cyrillic: Гора) is a village in the municipality of Kakanj, Bosnia and Herzegovina.

== Demographics ==
According to the 2013 census, its population was 248.

Ethnicity in 2013
Ethnicity	Number	Percentage
Bosniaks	236	95.2%
Croats	12	4.8%
Total	248	100%
