= Karaulsko Polje =

Village in Kakanj, Bosnia and Herzegovina

Karaulsko Polje Караулско Поље
- Village
- Location within Bosnia and Herzegovina
- Country: Bosnia and Herzegovina
- Entity: Federation of Bosnia and Herzegovina
- Canton: Zenica-Doboj
- Municipality: Kakanj

Area
  - Total: 0.42 sq mi (1.09 km^{2})

Population (2013)
  - Total: 404
  - Density: 960/sq mi (371/km^{2})
- Time zone: UTC+1 (CET)
  - Summer (DST): UTC+2 (CEST)

Karaulsko Polje (Cyrillic: Караулско Поље) is a village in the municipality of Kakanj, Bosnia and Herzegovina.

== Demographics ==
According to the 2013 census, its population was 404.

Ethnicity in 2013
Ethnicity	Number	Percentage
Bosniaks	397	98.3%
Serbs	1	0.2%
other/undeclared	6	1.5%
Total	404	100%
