= Hausovići =

Village in Kakanj, Bosnia and Herzegovina

Hausovići Хаусовићи
- Village
- Location within Bosnia and Herzegovina
- Coordinates: 44°10′N 18°07′E
- Country: Bosnia and Herzegovina
- Entity: Federation of Bosnia and Herzegovina
- Canton: Zenica-Doboj
- Municipality: Kakanj

Area
  - Total: 0.18 sq mi (0.47 km^{2})

Population (2013)
  - Total: 50
  - Density: 280/sq mi (110/km^{2})
- Time zone: UTC+1 (CET)
  - Summer (DST): UTC+2 (CEST)

Hausovići (Cyrillic: Хаусовићи) is a village in the municipality of Kakanj, Bosnia and Herzegovina.

== Demographics ==
According to the 2013 census, its population was 50.

Ethnicity in 2013
Ethnicity	Number	Percentage
Bosniaks	47	94.0%
other/undeclared	3	6.0%
Total	50	100%
