= Donji Banjevac =

Village in Kakanj, Bosnia and Herzegovina

Donji Banjevac Доњи Бањевац
- Village
- Location within Bosnia and Herzegovina
- Coordinates: 44°06′N 18°06′E
- Country: Bosnia and Herzegovina
- Entity: Federation of Bosnia and Herzegovina
- Canton: Zenica-Doboj
- Municipality: Kakanj

Area
  - Total: 0.30 sq mi (0.78 km^{2})

Population (2013)
  - Total: 65
  - Density: 220/sq mi (83/km^{2})
- Time zone: UTC+1 (CET)
  - Summer (DST): UTC+2 (CEST)

Donji Banjevac (Cyrillic: Доњи Бањевац) is a village in the municipality of Kakanj, Bosnia and Herzegovina.

== Demographics ==
According to the 2013 census, its population was 65.

Ethnicity in 2013
Ethnicity	Number	Percentage
Bosniaks	50	76.9%
Croats	15	23.1%
Total	65	100%
