= Gornja Papratnica =

Village in Kakanj, Bosnia and Herzegovina

Gornja Papratnica Горња Папратница
- Village
- Location within Bosnia and Herzegovina
- Coordinates: 44°05′N 18°04′E
- Country: Bosnia and Herzegovina
- Entity: Federation of Bosnia and Herzegovina
- Canton: Zenica-Doboj
- Municipality: Kakanj

Area
  - Total: 2.46 sq mi (6.38 km^{2})

Population (2013)
  - Total: 60
  - Density: 24/sq mi (9.4/km^{2})
- Time zone: UTC+1 (CET)
  - Summer (DST): UTC+2 (CEST)

Gornja Papratnica (Cyrillic: Горња Папратница) is a village in the municipality of Kakanj, Bosnia and Herzegovina.

== Demographics ==
According to the 2013 census, its population was 60, all Bosniaks.
