= Javor (Kakanj) =

Village in Kakanj, Bosnia and Herzegovina

Javor Јавор
- Village
- Location within Bosnia and Herzegovina
- Coordinates: 44°05′23″N 18°05′09″E
- Country: Bosnia and Herzegovina
- Entity: Federation of Bosnia and Herzegovina
- Canton: Zenica-Doboj
- Municipality: Kakanj

Area
  - Total: 0.70 sq mi (1.81 km^{2})

Population (2013)
  - Total: 125
  - Density: 179/sq mi (69.1/km^{2})
- Time zone: UTC+1 (CET)
  - Summer (DST): UTC+2 (CEST)

Javor (Cyrillic: Јавор) is a village in the municipality of Kakanj, Bosnia and Herzegovina.

== Demographics ==
According to the 2013 census, its population was 125, all Bosniaks.
