= Drijen (Kakanj) =

Village in Kakanj, Bosnia and Herzegovina

Drijen Дријен
- Village
- Location within Bosnia and Herzegovina
- Coordinates: 44°11′54″N 18°07′27″E
- Country: Bosnia and Herzegovina
- Entity: Federation of Bosnia and Herzegovina
- Canton: Zenica-Doboj
- Municipality: Kakanj

Area
  - Total: 1.65 sq mi (4.27 km^{2})

Population (2013)
  - Total: 93
  - Density: 56/sq mi (22/km^{2})
- Time zone: UTC+1 (CET)
  - Summer (DST): UTC+2 (CEST)

Drijen (Cyrillic: Дријен) is a village in the municipality of Kakanj, Bosnia and Herzegovina.

== Demographics ==
According to the 2013 census, its population was 93.

Ethnicity in 2013
Ethnicity	Number	Percentage
Bosniaks	91	97.8%
other/undeclared	2	2.2%
Total	93	100%
