= Brnj =

Village in Kakanj, Bosnia and Herzegovina

Brnj Брњ
- Village
- Location within Bosnia and Herzegovina
- Coordinates: 44°09′N 18°07′E
- Country: Bosnia and Herzegovina
- Entity: Federation of Bosnia and Herzegovina
- Canton: Zenica-Doboj
- Municipality: Kakanj

Area
  - Total: 1.11 sq mi (2.87 km^{2})

Population (2013)
  - Total: 483
  - Density: 436/sq mi (168/km^{2})
- Time zone: UTC+1 (CET)
  - Summer (DST): UTC+2 (CEST)

Brnj (Cyrillic: Брњ) is a village in the municipality of Kakanj, Bosnia and Herzegovina.

== Demographics ==
According to the 2013 census, its population was 483.

Ethnicity in 2013
Ethnicity	Number	Percentage
Bosniaks	451	93.4%
Croats	28	5.8%
other/undeclared	4	0.8%
Total	483	100%
