= Jehovina =

Village in Kakanj, Bosnia and Herzegovina

Jehovina Јеховина
- Village
- Interactive map of Jehovina
- Location within Bosnia and Herzegovina
- Coordinates: 44.127549°N 17.980463°E
- Country: Bosnia and Herzegovina
- Entity: Federation of Bosnia and Herzegovina
- Canton: Zenica-Doboj
- Municipality: Kakanj

Area
  - Total: 1.04 sq mi (2.69 km^{2})

Population (2013)
  - Total: 23
  - Density: 22/sq mi (8.6/km^{2})
- Time zone: UTC+1 (CET)
  - Summer (DST): UTC+2 (CEST)

Jehovina (Cyrillic: Јеховина) is a village in the municipality of Kakanj, Bosnia and Herzegovina.

== Demographics ==
According to the 2013 census, its population was 23, all Bosniaks.
