= Nažbilj =

Village in Kakanj, Bosnia and Herzegovina

Nažbilj Нажбиљ
- Village
- Location within Bosnia and Herzegovina
- Coordinates: 44°10′N 18°12′E
- Country: Bosnia and Herzegovina
- Entity: Federation of Bosnia and Herzegovina
- Canton: Zenica-Doboj
- Municipality: Kakanj

Area
  - Total: 1.54 sq mi (3.98 km^{2})

Population (2013)
  - Total: 176
  - Density: 115/sq mi (44.2/km^{2})
- Time zone: UTC+1 (CET)
  - Summer (DST): UTC+2 (CEST)

Nažbilj (Cyrillic: Нажбиљ) is a village in the municipality of Kakanj, Bosnia and Herzegovina.

== Demographics ==
According to the 2013 census, its population was 176.

Ethnicity in 2013
Ethnicity	Number	Percentage
Bosniaks	175	99.4%
other/undeclared	1	0.6%
Total	176	100%
