= Poljice, Kakanj =

Village in Kakanj, Bosnia and Herzegovina

Poljice Пољице
- Village
- Location within Bosnia and Herzegovina
- Coordinates: 44°04′36″N 18°06′47″E
- Country: Bosnia and Herzegovina
- Entity: Federation of Bosnia and Herzegovina
- Canton: Zenica-Doboj
- Municipality: Kakanj

Area
  - Total: 0.27 sq mi (0.70 km^{2})

Population (2013)
  - Total: 8
  - Density: 30/sq mi (11/km^{2})
- Time zone: UTC+1 (CET)
  - Summer (DST): UTC+2 (CEST)

Poljice is a village in the municipality of Kakanj, Bosnia and Herzegovina.

== Demographics ==
According to the 2013 census, its population was 8, all Croats.
