= Govedovići (Kakanj) =

Village in Kakanj, Bosnia and Herzegovina

Govedovići Говедовићи
- Village
- Location within Bosnia and Herzegovina
- Coordinates: 44°07′50″N 18°09′35″E
- Country: Bosnia and Herzegovina
- Entity: Federation of Bosnia and Herzegovina
- Canton: Zenica-Doboj
- Municipality: Kakanj

Area
  - Total: 0.46 sq mi (1.19 km^{2})

Population (2013)
  - Total: 0
  - Density: 0.0/sq mi (0.0/km^{2})
- Time zone: UTC+1 (CET)
  - Summer (DST): UTC+2 (CEST)

Govedovići (Cyrillic: Говедовићи) is a village in the municipality of Kakanj, Bosnia and Herzegovina.

== Demographics ==
According to the 2013 census, its population was nil, down from 217 in 1991.
