= Bičer =

Village in Kakanj, Bosnia and Herzegovina

Bičer Бичер
- Village
- Location within Bosnia and Herzegovina
- Coordinates: 44°07′0″N 18°05′05″E
- Country: Bosnia and Herzegovina
- Entity: Federation of Bosnia and Herzegovina
- Canton: Zenica-Doboj
- Municipality: Kakanj

Area
  - Total: 1.16 sq mi (3.01 km^{2})

Population (2013)
  - Total: 288
  - Density: 248/sq mi (95.7/km^{2})
- Time zone: UTC+1 (CET)
  - Summer (DST): UTC+2 (CEST)

Bičer (Cyrillic: Бичер) is a village in the municipality of Kakanj, Bosnia and Herzegovina.

== Demographics ==
=== Population Distribution (1991) ===
Nationality	Number	%
Bosniaks	315	83.11
Serbs	54	14.25
Yugoslavs	7	1.85
Unknown / other	3	0.79

In 1991, the local community of Bicer had 1,460 inhabitants, divided as follows :

Nationality	Number	%
Bosniaks	901	61.71
Serbs	333	22.81
Yugoslavs	85	5.82
Croats	49	3.36
Unknown / other	92	6.30

According to the 2013 census, its population was 288.

Ethnicity in 2013
Ethnicity	Number	Percentage
Bosniaks	279	96.9%
Serbs	8	2.8%
other/undeclared	1	0.3%
Total	288	100%
