= Kujavče =

Village in Kakanj, Bosnia and Herzegovina

Kujavče Кујавче
- Village
- Location within Bosnia and Herzegovina
- Coordinates: 44°05′N 18°06′E
- Country: Bosnia and Herzegovina
- Entity: Federation of Bosnia and Herzegovina
- Canton: Zenica-Doboj
- Municipality: Kakanj

Area
  - Total: 0.52 sq mi (1.34 km^{2})

Population (2013)
  - Total: 248
  - Density: 479/sq mi (185/km^{2})
- Time zone: UTC+1 (CET)
  - Summer (DST): UTC+2 (CEST)

Kujavče (Cyrillic: Кујавче) is a village in the municipality of Kakanj, Bosnia and Herzegovina.

== Demographics ==
According to the 2013 census, its population was 248.

Ethnicity in 2013
Ethnicity	Number	Percentage
Bosniaks	244	98.4%
other/undeclared	4	1.6%
Total	248	100%
