= Lučići =

Village in Kakanj, Bosnia and Herzegovina

Lučići Лучићи
- Village
- Location within Bosnia and Herzegovina
- Coordinates: 44°06′03″N 18°13′20″E
- Country: Bosnia and Herzegovina
- Entity: Federation of Bosnia and Herzegovina
- Canton: Zenica-Doboj
- Municipality: Kakanj

Area
  - Total: 0.69 sq mi (1.80 km^{2})

Population (2013)
  - Total: 29
  - Density: 42/sq mi (16/km^{2})
- Time zone: UTC+1 (CET)
  - Summer (DST): UTC+2 (CEST)

Lučići (Cyrillic: Лучићи) is a village in the municipality of Kakanj in Bosnia and Herzegovina.

== Demographics ==
According to the 2013 census, its population was 29.

Ethnicity in 2013
Ethnicity	Number	Percentage
Bosniaks	22	75.9%
Croats	5	17.2%
other/undeclared	2	6.9%
Total	29	100%
