= Popržena Gora =

Village in Kakanj, Bosnia and Herzegovina

Popržena Gora Попржена Гора
- Village
- Location within Bosnia and Herzegovina
- Country: Bosnia and Herzegovina
- Entity: Federation of Bosnia and Herzegovina
- Canton: Zenica-Doboj
- Municipality: Kakanj

Area
  - Total: 2.69 sq mi (6.96 km^{2})

Population (2013)
  - Total: 176
  - Density: 65.5/sq mi (25.3/km^{2})
- Time zone: UTC+1 (CET)
  - Summer (DST): UTC+2 (CEST)

Popržena Gora (Cyrillic: Попржена Гора) is a village in the municipality of Kakanj, Bosnia and Herzegovina.

== Demographics ==
According to the 2013 census, its population was 176, all Bosniaks.
