= Mioči =

Village in Kakanj, Bosnia and Herzegovina

Mioči Миочи
- Village
- Location within Bosnia and Herzegovina
- Coordinates: 44°09′03″N 18°01′43″E
- Country: Bosnia and Herzegovina
- Entity: Federation of Bosnia and Herzegovina
- Canton: Zenica-Doboj
- Municipality: Kakanj

Area
  - Total: 1.76 sq mi (4.55 km^{2})

Population (2013)
  - Total: 31
  - Density: 18/sq mi (6.8/km^{2})
- Time zone: UTC+1 (CET)
  - Summer (DST): UTC+2 (CEST)

Mioči (Cyrillic: Миочи) is a village in the municipality of Kakanj, Bosnia and Herzegovina.Mioci is 62.9 km away from Sarajevo.

== Demographics ==
According to the 2013 census, its population was 31.

Ethnicity in 2013
Ethnicity	Number	Percentage
Bosniaks	30	96.8%
Serbs	1	3.2%
Total	31	100%
