= Hrasno (Kakanj) =

Village in Kakanj, Bosnia and Herzegovina

Hrasno Храсно
- Village
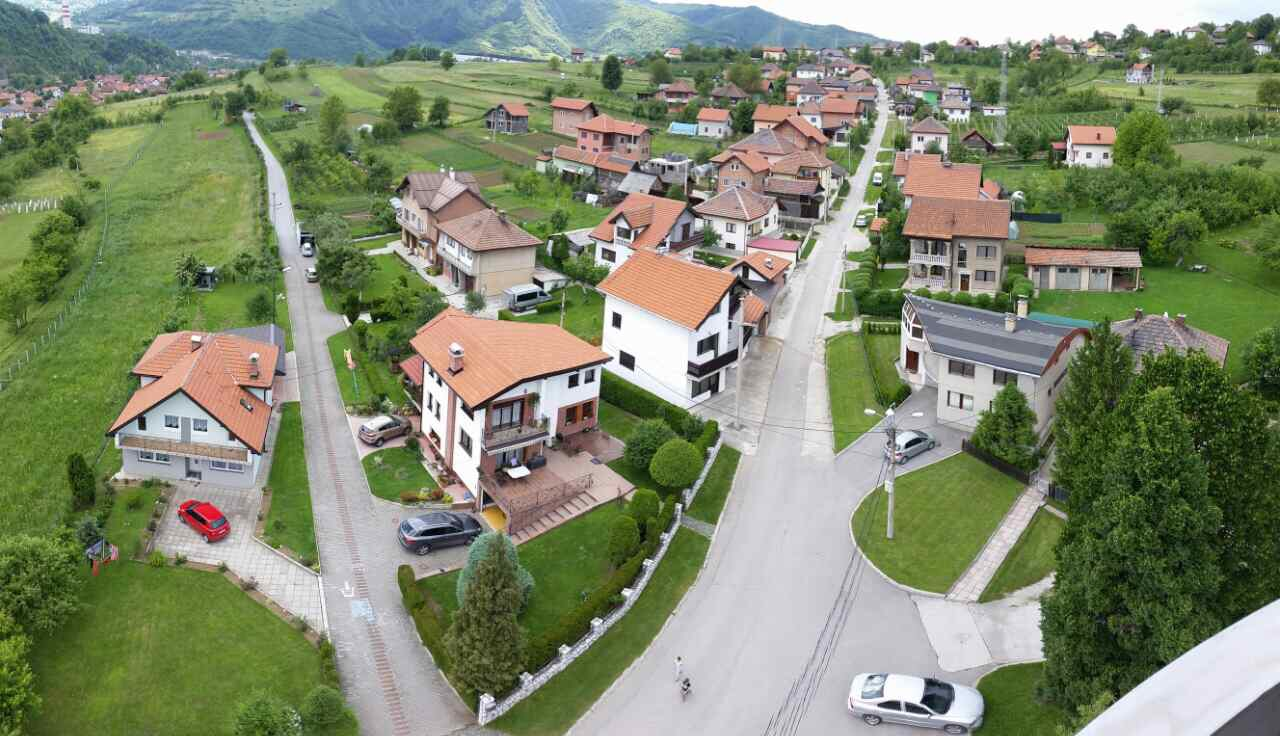

- Location within Bosnia and Herzegovina
- Coordinates: 44°06′19″N 18°07′27″E
- Country: Bosnia and Herzegovina
- Entity: Federation of Bosnia and Herzegovina
- Canton: Zenica-Doboj
- Municipality: Kakanj

Area
  - Total: 0.32 sq mi (0.82 km^{2})

Population (2013)
  - Total: 410
  - Density: 1,300/sq mi (500/km^{2})
- Time zone: UTC+1 (CET)
  - Summer (DST): UTC+2 (CEST)

Hrasno (Cyrillic: Храсно) is a village in the municipality of Kakanj, Bosnia and Herzegovina.

== Demographics ==
According to the 2013 census, its population was 410.

Ethnicity in 2013
Ethnicity	Number	Percentage
Bosniaks	400	97.6%
other/undeclared	10	2.4%
Total	410	100%
