= Mramor (Kakanj) =

Village in Kakanj, Bosnia and Herzegovina

Mramor Мрамор
- Village
- Location within Bosnia and Herzegovina
- Country: Bosnia and Herzegovina
- Entity: Federation of Bosnia and Herzegovina
- Canton: Zenica-Doboj
- Municipality: Kakanj

Area
  - Total: 1.30 sq mi (3.36 km^{2})

Population (2013)
  - Total: 163
  - Density: 126/sq mi (48.5/km^{2})
- Time zone: UTC+1 (CET)
  - Summer (DST): UTC+2 (CEST)

Mramor (Cyrillic: Мрамор) is a village in the municipality of Kakanj, Bosnia and Herzegovina.

== Demographics ==
According to the 2013 census, its population was 163.

Ethnicity in 2013
Ethnicity	Number	Percentage
Bosniaks	160	98.2%
other/undeclared	3	1.8%
Total	163	100%
