= Obre =

Village in Kakanj, Bosnia and Herzegovina

Obre Обре
- Village
- Location within Bosnia and Herzegovina
- Coordinates: 44°06′12″N 18°08′15″E
- Country: Bosnia and Herzegovina
- Entity: Federation of Bosnia and Herzegovina
- Canton: Zenica-Doboj
- Municipality: Kakanj

Area
  - Total: 0.32 sq mi (0.82 km^{2})

Population (2013)
  - Total: 466
  - Density: 1,500/sq mi (570/km^{2})
- Time zone: UTC+1 (CET)
  - Summer (DST): UTC+2 (CEST)

Obre (Cyrillic: Обре) is a village in the municipality of Kakanj, Bosnia and Herzegovina.

== Demographics ==
According to the 2013 census, its population was 466.

Ethnicity in 2013
Ethnicity	Number	Percentage
Bosniaks	453	97.2%
Croats	6	1.3%
other/undeclared	7	1.5%
Total	466	100%
