= Crnač =

Village in Kakanj, Bosnia and Herzegovina

Crnač Црнач
- Village
- Location within Bosnia and Herzegovina
- Coordinates: 44°09′29″N 18°08′09″E
- Country: Bosnia and Herzegovina
- Entity: Federation of Bosnia and Herzegovina
- Canton: Zenica-Doboj
- Municipality: Kakanj

Area
  - Total: 0.97 sq mi (2.52 km^{2})

Population (2013)
  - Total: 398
  - Density: 409/sq mi (158/km^{2})
- Time zone: UTC+1 (CET)
  - Summer (DST): UTC+2 (CEST)

Crnač (Cyrillic: Црнач) is a village in the municipality of Kakanj, Bosnia and Herzegovina.

== Demographics ==
According to the 2013 census, its population was 398.

Ethnicity in 2013
Ethnicity	Number	Percentage
Bosniaks	317	79.6%
Croats	67	16.8%
Serbs	1	0.3%
other/undeclared	13	3.3%
Total	398	100%
