= Jerevice =

Village in Kakanj, Bosnia and Herzegovina

Jerevice Јеревице
- Village
- Location within Bosnia and Herzegovina
- Country: Bosnia and Herzegovina
- Entity: Federation of Bosnia and Herzegovina
- Canton: Zenica-Doboj
- Municipality: Kakanj

Area
  - Total: 2.19 sq mi (5.68 km^{2})

Population (2013)
  - Total: 110
  - Density: 50/sq mi (19/km^{2})
- Time zone: UTC+1 (CET)
  - Summer (DST): UTC+2 (CEST)

Jerevice (Cyrillic: Јеревице) is a village in the municipality of Kakanj, Bosnia and Herzegovina.

== Demographics ==
According to the 2013 census, its population was 110.

Ethnicity in 2013
Ethnicity	Number	Percentage
Bosniaks	108	98.2%
other/undeclared	2	1.8%
Total	110	100%
