= Viduša =

Village in Kakanj, Bosnia and Herzegovina

Viduša Видуша
- Village
- Location within Bosnia and Herzegovina
- Coordinates: 44°06′39″N 18°02′00″E
- Country: Bosnia and Herzegovina
- Entity: Federation of Bosnia and Herzegovina
- Canton: Zenica-Doboj
- Municipality: Kakanj

Area
  - Total: 1.98 sq mi (5.12 km^{2})

Population (2013)
  - Total: 9
  - Density: 4.6/sq mi (1.8/km^{2})
- Time zone: UTC+1 (CET)
  - Summer (DST): UTC+2 (CEST)

Viduša (Cyrillic: Видуша) is a village in the municipality of Kakanj, Bosnia and Herzegovina.

== Demographics ==
According to the 2013 census, its population was 9, all Bosniaks.
