= Halinovići =

Village in Kakanj, Bosnia and Herzegovina

Halinovići Халиновићи
- Village
- Location within Bosnia and Herzegovina
- Coordinates: 44°10′N 18°11′E
- Country: Bosnia and Herzegovina
- Entity: Federation of Bosnia and Herzegovina
- Canton: Zenica-Doboj
- Municipality: Kakanj

Area
  - Total: 0.42 sq mi (1.09 km^{2})

Population (2013)
  - Total: 70
  - Density: 170/sq mi (64/km^{2})
- Time zone: UTC+1 (CET)
  - Summer (DST): UTC+2 (CEST)

Halinovići (Cyrillic: Халиновићи) is a village in the municipality of Kakanj, Bosnia and Herzegovina.

== Demographics ==
According to the 2013 census, its population was 70, all Bosniaks.
