= Ričica =

Village in Kakanj, Bosnia and Herzegovina

Ričica Ричица
- Village
- Location within Bosnia and Herzegovina
- Coordinates: 44°07′N 18°11′E
- Country: Bosnia and Herzegovina
- Entity: Federation of Bosnia and Herzegovina
- Canton: Zenica-Doboj
- Municipality: Kakanj

Area
  - Total: 1.41 sq mi (3.65 km^{2})

Population (2013)
  - Total: 400
  - Density: 280/sq mi (110/km^{2})
- Time zone: UTC+1 (CET)
  - Summer (DST): UTC+2 (CEST)

Ričica (Cyrillic: Ричица) is a village in the municipality of Kakanj, Bosnia and Herzegovina.

== Demographics ==
According to the 2013 census, its population was 400.

Ethnicity in 2013
Ethnicity	Number	Percentage
Bosniaks	384	96.0%
Croats	6	1.5%
other/undeclared	10	2.5%
Total	400	100%
