= Kondžilo (Kakanj) =

Village in Kakanj, Bosnia and Herzegovina

Kondžilo Конџило
- Village
- Location within Bosnia and Herzegovina
- Coordinates: 44°11′47″N 18°05′33″E
- Country: Bosnia and Herzegovina
- Entity: Federation of Bosnia and Herzegovina
- Canton: Zenica-Doboj
- Municipality: Kakanj

Area
  - Total: 0.69 sq mi (1.78 km^{2})

Population (2013)
  - Total: 0
  - Density: 0.0/sq mi (0.0/km^{2})
- Time zone: UTC+1 (CET)
  - Summer (DST): UTC+2 (CEST)

Kondžilo (Cyrillic: Конџило) is a village in the municipality of Kakanj, Bosnia and Herzegovina.

== Demographics ==
According to the 2013 census, its population was nil, down from 42 in 1991.
