= Željeznička Stanica Kakanj =

Village in Kakanj, Bosnia and Herzegovina

Željeznička Stanica Kakanj Жељезничка Станица Какањ
- Village
- Location within Bosnia and Herzegovina
- Coordinates: 44°07′48″N 18°06′36″E
- Country: Bosnia and Herzegovina
- Entity: Federation of Bosnia and Herzegovina
- Canton: Zenica-Doboj
- Municipality: Kakanj

Area
  - Total: 0.12 sq mi (0.31 km^{2})

Population (2013)
  - Total: 529
  - Density: 4,400/sq mi (1,700/km^{2})
- Time zone: UTC+1 (CET)
  - Summer (DST): UTC+2 (CEST)

Željeznička Stanica Kakanj (Cyrillic: Жељезничка Станица Какањ) is a village in the municipality of Kakanj, Bosnia and Herzegovina. The name means "Kakanj railway station".

== Demographics ==
According to the 2013 census, its population was 529.

Ethnicity in 2013
| Ethnicity | Number | Percentage |
|---|---|---|
| Bosniaks | 341 | 64.5% |
| Croats | 11 | 2.1% |
| Serbs | 10 | 1.9% |
| other/undeclared | 167 | 31.6% |
| Total | 529 | 100% |
