= Dubovo Brdo =

Village in Kakanj, Bosnia and Herzegovina

Dubovo Brdo Дубово Брдо
- Village
- Location within Bosnia and Herzegovina
- Coordinates: 44°12′N 18°06′E
- Country: Bosnia and Herzegovina
- Entity: Federation of Bosnia and Herzegovina
- Canton: Zenica-Doboj
- Municipality: Kakanj

Area
  - Total: 0.80 sq mi (2.08 km^{2})

Population (2013)
  - Total: 177
  - Density: 220/sq mi (85.1/km^{2})
- Time zone: UTC+1 (CET)
  - Summer (DST): UTC+2 (CEST)

Dubovo Brdo (Cyrillic: Дубово Брдо) is a village in the municipality of Kakanj, Bosnia and Herzegovina.

== Demographics ==
According to the 2013 census, its population was 177, all Bosniaks.
