= Donja Papratnica =

Village in Kakanj, Bosnia and Herzegovina

Donja Papratnica Доња Папратница
- Village
- Location within Bosnia and Herzegovina
- Coordinates: 44°05′N 18°06′E
- Country: Bosnia and Herzegovina
- Entity: Federation of Bosnia and Herzegovina
- Canton: Zenica-Doboj
- Municipality: Kakanj

Area
  - Total: 1.34 sq mi (3.46 km^{2})

Population (2013)
  - Total: 570
  - Density: 430/sq mi (160/km^{2})
- Time zone: UTC+1 (CET)
  - Summer (DST): UTC+2 (CEST)

Donja Papratnica (Cyrillic: Доња Папратница) is a village in the municipality of Kakanj, Bosnia and Herzegovina.

== Demographics ==
According to the 2013 census, its population was 570.

Ethnicity in 2013
Ethnicity	Number	Percentage
Bosniaks	569	99.8%
other/undeclared	1	0.2%
Total	570	100%
