= Termoelektrana =

Village in Kakanj, Bosnia and Herzegovina

Termoelektrana Термоелектрана
- Village
- Location within Bosnia and Herzegovina
- Country: Bosnia and Herzegovina
- Entity: Federation of Bosnia and Herzegovina
- Canton: Zenica-Doboj
- Municipality: Kakanj

Area
  - Total: 0.24 sq mi (0.63 km^{2})

Population (2013)
  - Total: 131
  - Density: 540/sq mi (210/km^{2})
- Time zone: UTC+1 (CET)
  - Summer (DST): UTC+2 (CEST)

Termoelektrana (Cyrillic: Термоелектрана) is a village in the municipality of Kakanj, Bosnia and Herzegovina. The name means "thermal power station", due to thermal power station located in the village.

== Demographics ==
According to the 2013 census, its population was 131.

Ethnicity in 2013
Ethnicity	Number	Percentage
Bosniaks	102	77.9%
Croats	13	9.9%
Serbs	8	6.1%
other/undeclared	8	6.1%
Total	131	100%
