= Miljačići =

Village in Kakanj, Bosnia and Herzegovina

Miljačići Миљачићи
- Village
- Location within Bosnia and Herzegovina
- Coordinates: 44°05′27″N 18°09′19″E
- Country: Bosnia and Herzegovina
- Entity: Federation of Bosnia and Herzegovina
- Canton: Zenica-Doboj
- Municipality: Kakanj

Area
  - Total: 1.26 sq mi (3.27 km^{2})

Population (2013)
  - Total: 64
  - Density: 51/sq mi (20/km^{2})
- Time zone: UTC+1 (CET)
  - Summer (DST): UTC+2 (CEST)

Miljačići (Cyrillic: Миљачићи) is a village in the municipality of Kakanj, Bosnia and Herzegovina.

== Demographics ==
According to the 2013 census, its population was 64.

Ethnicity in 2013
Ethnicity	Number	Percentage
Bosniaks	31	48.4%
Croats	29	45.3%
other/undeclared	4	6.3%
Total	64	100%
