= Donji Lučani =

Village in Kakanj, Bosnia and Herzegovina

Donji Lučani Доњи Лучани
- Village
- Location within Bosnia and Herzegovina
- Coordinates: 44°08′N 17°58′E
- Country: Bosnia and Herzegovina
- Entity: Federation of Bosnia and Herzegovina
- Canton: Zenica-Doboj
- Municipality: Kakanj

Area
  - Total: 0.87 sq mi (2.26 km^{2})

Population (2013)
  - Total: 0
  - Density: 0.0/sq mi (0.0/km^{2})
- Time zone: UTC+1 (CET)
  - Summer (DST): UTC+2 (CEST)

Donji Lučani (Cyrillic: Доњи Лучани) is a village in the municipality of Kakanj, Bosnia and Herzegovina.

== Demographics ==
According to the 2013 census, its population was nil, down from 114 in 1991.
