= Slivanj =

Village in Kakanj, Bosnia and Herzegovina

Slivanj Сливањ
- Village
- Location within Bosnia and Herzegovina
- Coordinates: 44°13′N 18°05′E
- Country: Bosnia and Herzegovina
- Entity: Federation of Bosnia and Herzegovina
- Canton: Zenica-Doboj
- Municipality: Kakanj

Area
  - Total: 1.19 sq mi (3.09 km^{2})

Population (2013)
  - Total: 67
  - Density: 56/sq mi (22/km^{2})
- Time zone: UTC+1 (CET)
  - Summer (DST): UTC+2 (CEST)

Slivanj (Cyrillic: Сливањ) is a village in the municipality of Kakanj, Bosnia and Herzegovina.

== Demographics ==
According to the 2013 census, its population was 67, all Bosniaks.
