= Bištrani =

Village in Kakanj, Bosnia and Herzegovina

Bištrani Биштрани
- Village
- Location within Bosnia and Herzegovina
- Coordinates: 44°04′11″N 18°10′49″E
- Country: Bosnia and Herzegovina
- Entity: Federation of Bosnia and Herzegovina
- Canton: Zenica-Doboj
- Municipality: Kakanj

Area
  - Total: 1.97 sq mi (5.11 km^{2})

Population (2013)
  - Total: 341
  - Density: 173/sq mi (66.7/km^{2})
- Time zone: UTC+1 (CET)
  - Summer (DST): UTC+2 (CEST)

Bištrani (Cyrillic: Биштрани) is a village in the municipality of Kakanj, Bosnia and Herzegovina.

== Demographics ==
According to the 2013 census, its population was 341.

Ethnicity in 2013
Ethnicity	Number	Percentage
Bosniaks	325	95.3%
Croats	12	3.5%
other/undeclared	4	1.2%
Total	341	100%
