= Bjelavići =

Village in Kakanj, Bosnia and Herzegovina

Bjelavići Бјелавићи
- Village
- Location within Bosnia and Herzegovina
- Coordinates: 44°06′33″N 18°08′40″E
- Country: Bosnia and Herzegovina
- Entity: Federation of Bosnia and Herzegovina
- Canton: Zenica-Doboj
- Municipality: Kakanj

Area
  - Total: 0.75 sq mi (1.93 km^{2})

Population (2013)
  - Total: 101
  - Density: 136/sq mi (52.3/km^{2})
- Time zone: UTC+1 (CET)
  - Summer (DST): UTC+2 (CEST)

Bjelavići (Cyrillic: Бјелавићи) is a village in the municipality of Kakanj, Bosnia and Herzegovina.

== Demographics ==
According to the 2013 census, its population was 101.

Ethnicity in 2013
Ethnicity	Number	Percentage
Croats	92	91.1%
Bosniaks	3	3.0%
other/undeclared	6	5.9%
Total	101	100%
