= Dumanac =

Village in Kakanj, Bosnia and Herzegovina

Dumanac Думанац
- Village
- Location within Bosnia and Herzegovina
- Coordinates: 44°06′36″N 18°04′12″E
- Country: Bosnia and Herzegovina
- Entity: Federation of Bosnia and Herzegovina
- Canton: Zenica-Doboj
- Municipality: Kakanj

Area
  - Total: 1.25 sq mi (3.25 km^{2})

Population (2013)
  - Total: 582
  - Density: 464/sq mi (179/km^{2})
- Time zone: UTC+1 (CET)
  - Summer (DST): UTC+2 (CEST)

Dumanac (Cyrillic: Думанац) is a village in the municipality of Kakanj, Bosnia and Herzegovina.

== Demographics ==
According to the 2013 census, its population was 582.

Ethnicity in 2013
Ethnicity	Number	Percentage
Bosniaks	568	97.6%
Croats	1	0.2%
other/undeclared	13	2.2%
Total	582	100%
