= Turbići =

Village in Kakanj, Bosnia and Herzegovina

Turbići Турбићи
- Village
- Location within Bosnia and Herzegovina
- Coordinates: 44°05′N 18°07′E
- Country: Bosnia and Herzegovina
- Entity: Federation of Bosnia and Herzegovina
- Canton: Zenica-Doboj
- Municipality: Kakanj

Area
  - Total: 0.54 sq mi (1.4 km^{2})

Population (2013)
  - Total: 43
  - Density: 80/sq mi (31/km^{2})
- Time zone: UTC+1 (CET)
  - Summer (DST): UTC+2 (CEST)
- Area code: (+387) 32

Turbići (Cyrillic: Турбићи) is a village in the municipality of Kakanj, Bosnia and Herzegovina, counting 46 inhabitants as of 2013.

== Demographics ==
According to the 2013 census, its population was 43.

Ethnicity in 2013
Ethnicity	Number	Percentage
Croats	23	53.5%
Bosniaks	14	32.6%
other/undeclared	6	14.0%
Total	43	100%
