= Desetnik =

Village in Kakanj, Bosnia and Herzegovina

Desetnik Досетник
- Village
- Location within Bosnia and Herzegovina
- Coordinates: 44°07′12″N 18°03′36″E
- Country: Bosnia and Herzegovina
- Entity: Federation of Bosnia and Herzegovina
- Canton: Zenica-Doboj
- Municipality: Kakanj

Area
  - Total: 2.79 sq mi (7.22 km^{2})

Population (2013)
  - Total: 126
  - Density: 45.2/sq mi (17.5/km^{2})
- Time zone: UTC+1 (CET)
  - Summer (DST): UTC+2 (CEST)

Desetnik (Cyrillic: Досетник) is a village in the municipality of Kakanj, Bosnia and Herzegovina.

== Demographics ==
According to the 2013 census, its population was 126.

Ethnicity in 2013
Ethnicity	Number	Percentage
Bosniaks	123	97.6%
other/undeclared	3	2.4%
Total	126	100%
