= Krševac =

Village in Kakanj, Bosnia and Herzegovina

Krševac Кршевац
- Village
- Location within Bosnia and Herzegovina
- Coordinates: 44°15′24″N 18°05′51″E
- Country: Bosnia and Herzegovina
- Entity: Federation of Bosnia and Herzegovina
- Canton: Zenica-Doboj
- Municipality: Kakanj

Area
  - Total: 1.47 sq mi (3.81 km^{2})

Population (2013)
  - Total: 369
  - Density: 251/sq mi (96.9/km^{2})
- Time zone: UTC+1 (CET)
  - Summer (DST): UTC+2 (CEST)

Krševac (Cyrillic: Кршевац) is a village in the municipality of Kakanj, Bosnia and Herzegovina.

== Demographics ==
According to the 2013 census, its population was 369.

Ethnicity in 2013
Ethnicity	Number	Percentage
Bosniaks	368	99.7%
other/undeclared	1	0.3%
Total	369	100%
