= Podborje =

Village in Kakanj, Bosnia and Herzegovina

Podborje Подборје
- Village
- Location within Bosnia and Herzegovina
- Coordinates: 44°16′N 18°07′E
- Country: Bosnia and Herzegovina
- Entity: Federation of Bosnia and Herzegovina
- Canton: Zenica-Doboj
- Municipality: Kakanj

Area
  - Total: 6.13 sq mi (15.87 km^{2})

Population (2013)
  - Total: 217
  - Density: 35.4/sq mi (13.7/km^{2})
- Time zone: UTC+1 (CET)
  - Summer (DST): UTC+2 (CEST)

Podborje (Cyrillic: Подборје) is a village in the municipality of Kakanj, Bosnia and Herzegovina.

== Demographics ==
According to the 2013 census, its population was 217.

Ethnicity in 2013
Ethnicity	Number	Percentage
Bosniaks	215	99.1%
Croats	1	0.5%
other/undeclared	1	0.5%
Total	217	100%
