= Lipnica (Kakanj) =

Village in Kakanj, Bosnia and Herzegovina

Lipnica Липница
- Village
- Location within Bosnia and Herzegovina
- Coordinates: 44°11′26″N 18°10′56″E
- Country: Bosnia and Herzegovina
- Entity: Federation of Bosnia and Herzegovina
- Canton: Zenica-Doboj
- Municipality: Kakanj

Area
  - Total: 8.45 sq mi (21.89 km^{2})

Population (2013)
  - Total: 58
  - Density: 6.9/sq mi (2.6/km^{2})
- Time zone: UTC+1 (CET)
  - Summer (DST): UTC+2 (CEST)

Lipnica (Cyrillic: Липница) is a village in the municipality of Kakanj, Bosnia and Herzegovina.

== Demographics ==
According to the 2013 census, its population was 58.

Ethnicity in 2013
Ethnicity	Number	Percentage
Bosniaks	53	91.4%
Croats	5	8.6%
Total	58	100%
