= Brnjic =

Village in Kakanj, Bosnia and Herzegovina

- Village
- Location within Bosnia and Herzegovina
- Coordinates: 44°14′N 18°07′E
- Country: Bosnia and Herzegovina
- Entity: Federation of Bosnia and Herzegovina
- Canton: Zenica-Doboj
- Municipality: Kakanj

Area
  - Total: 4.97 sq mi (12.88 km^{2})

Population (2013)
  - Total: 321
  - Density: 64.5/sq mi (24.9/km^{2})
- Time zone: UTC+1 (CET)
  - Summer (DST): UTC+2 (CEST)

Brnjic (Cyrillic: Брњиц) is a village in the municipality of Kakanj, Bosnia and Herzegovina.

== Demographics ==
According to the 2013 census, its population was 321, all Bosniaks.
