= Sebinje =

Village in Kakanj, Bosnia and Herzegovina

Sebinje Себиње
- Village
- Location within Bosnia and Herzegovina
- Coordinates: 44°05′N 18°01′E
- Country: Bosnia and Herzegovina
- Entity: Federation of Bosnia and Herzegovina
- Canton: Zenica-Doboj
- Municipality: Kakanj

Area
  - Total: 1.24 sq mi (3.21 km^{2})

Population (2013)
  - Total: 27
  - Density: 22/sq mi (8.4/km^{2})
- Time zone: UTC+1 (CET)
  - Summer (DST): UTC+2 (CEST)

Sebinje (Cyrillic: Себиње) is a village in the municipality of Kakanj, Bosnia and Herzegovina.

== Demographics ==
According to the 2013 census, its population was 27, all Bosniaks.
