= Slivnice =

Village in Kakanj, Bosnia and Herzegovina

Slivnice Сливнице
- Village
- Location within Bosnia and Herzegovina
- Coordinates: 44°07′N 18°06′E
- Country: Bosnia and Herzegovina
- Entity: Federation of Bosnia and Herzegovina
- Canton: Zenica-Doboj
- Municipality: Kakanj

Area
  - Total: 0.26 sq mi (0.67 km^{2})

Population (2013)
  - Total: 386
  - Density: 1,500/sq mi (580/km^{2})
- Time zone: UTC+1 (CET)
  - Summer (DST): UTC+2 (CEST)

Slivnice (Cyrillic: Сливнице) is a village in the municipality of Kakanj, Bosnia and Herzegovina.

== Demographics ==
According to the 2013 census, its population was 386.

Ethnicity in 2013
Ethnicity	Number	Percentage
Bosniaks	381	98.7%
other/undeclared	5	1.3%
Total	386	100%
