= Zgošća (river) =

River in Kakanj, Bosnia and Herzegovina

- Location within Bosnia and Herzegovina

Location
- Country: Bosnia and Herzegovina

Physical characteristics
- Source: Ponijeri Mountain
  - location: Ponijeri
  - coordinates: 44°15′02″N 18°10′55″E
  - elevation: 1,115 m (3,658 ft)
- Mouth
  - location: Bosna in Kakanj
  - coordinates: 44°07′25″N 18°06′46″E
  - elevation: 685 m (2,247 ft)
- Length: 26 km (16 mi)

Basin features
- Progression: Bosna→ Sava→ Danube→ Black Sea

Zgošća is river near Kakanj in Bosnia and Herzegovina. The river is known for its canyon, which is protected natural monument.

The Zgošća is right tributary of the river Bosna, and it flows through Kakanj, which sits on the banks of the Zgošća and Bosna. It springs from Ponijeri at 1200 meters a.s.l. After the source and up to the village of Tršće, it cut a deep canyon, in the Vukanjsko brdo massif, which is made of dolomite and limestone. Many smaller streams that flow into Zgošća in that canyon have built numerous travertine barriers over which smaller waterfalls and rapids extend. After the canyon, the river spreads into the 3 kilometer long Tršće-Ivnica valley. In the village of Ivnica, it receives its first major tributary, the Vukanjska river. After passing through the village of Ivnica, Zgošća passes through another canyon, the Zgošća Gorge, over 300 meters deep and about 100 meters wide. The river cut its course in the massifs of Crnački Brdo, Gradina and Krevnik. The stream Zagradski Potok spills into Zgošća here. Further through the gorge, it cuts numerous limestone rocks up to 50 meters high, the most famous of which is Crvena Stijena rock in Gradina locality. The rocks are suitable for extreme sports such as mountaineering, and surrounding area for cycling. After the gorge, the river spreads into the Zgošća-Kakanj valley, where it receives the Crnački Potok stream on the right, and the Bukovljanski Potok stream on the left. It then passes through a narrow strait made of marl and reaches Kakanj where it passes through the town. Before it flows into the Bosnia, and due to the proximity of the Kakanj mine, the river is polluted in its lower course.

The Zgošća Stećak was found in the river's bed in the mid-20th century.
