= Papratno (Kakanj) =

Village in Kakanj, Bosnia and Herzegovina

Papratno Папратно
- Village
- Location within Bosnia and Herzegovina
- Coordinates: 44°06′25″N 18°12′39″E
- Country: Bosnia and Herzegovina
- Entity: Federation of Bosnia and Herzegovina
- Canton: Zenica-Doboj
- Municipality: Kakanj

Area
  - Total: 0.67 sq mi (1.74 km^{2})

Population (2013)
  - Total: 26
  - Density: 39/sq mi (15/km^{2})
- Time zone: UTC+1 (CET)
  - Summer (DST): UTC+2 (CEST)

Papratno (Cyrillic: Папратно) is a village in the municipality of Kakanj, Bosnia and Herzegovina. It contains one of the biggest production lines for compost.

== Demographics ==
According to the 2013 census, its population was 26.

Ethnicity in 2013
Ethnicity	Number	Percentage
Croats	25	96.2%
other/undeclared	1	3.8%
Total	26	100%
