= Jezero, Kakanj =

Village in Kakanj, Bosnia and Herzegovina

Jezero
- Village
- Location within Bosnia and Herzegovina
- Country: Bosnia and Herzegovina
- Entity: Federation of Bosnia and Herzegovina
- Canton: Zenica-Doboj
- Municipality: Kakanj

Area
  - Total: 0.21 sq mi (0.55 km^{2})

Population (2013)
  - Total: 216
  - Density: 1,000/sq mi (390/km^{2})
- Time zone: UTC+1 (CET)
  - Summer (DST): UTC+2 (CEST)

Jezero is a village in the municipality of Kakanj, Bosnia and Herzegovina.

== Demographics ==
According to the 2013 census, its population was 216.

Ethnicity in 2013
Ethnicity	Number	Percentage
Bosniaks	193	89.4%
Croats	2	0.9%
other/undeclared	21	9.7%
Total	216	100%
