= Zagrađe, Kakanj =

Village in Kakanj, Bosnia and Herzegovina

Zagrađe Заграђе
- Village
- Location within Bosnia and Herzegovina
- Coordinates: 44°09′41″N 18°09′40″E
- Country: Bosnia and Herzegovina
- Entity: Federation of Bosnia and Herzegovina
- Canton: Zenica-Doboj
- Municipality: Kakanj

Area
  - Total: 2.40 sq mi (6.21 km^{2})

Population (2013)
  - Total: 315
  - Density: 131/sq mi (50.7/km^{2})
- Time zone: UTC+1 (CET)
  - Summer (DST): UTC+2 (CEST)

Zagrađe (Cyrillic: Заграђе) is a village in the municipality of Kakanj, Bosnia and Herzegovina.

== Demographics ==
According to the 2013 census, its population was 315, all Bosniaks.
