= Semetiš =

Village in Kakanj, Bosnia and Herzegovina

Semetiš Семетиш
- Village
- Location within Bosnia and Herzegovina
- Coordinates: 44°10′N 18°09′E
- Country: Bosnia and Herzegovina
- Entity: Federation of Bosnia and Herzegovina
- Canton: Zenica-Doboj
- Municipality: Kakanj

Area
  - Total: 0.85 sq mi (2.19 km^{2})

Population (2013)
  - Total: 100
  - Density: 120/sq mi (46/km^{2})
- Time zone: UTC+1 (CET)
  - Summer (DST): UTC+2 (CEST)

Semetiš (Cyrillic: Семетиш) is a village in the municipality of Kakanj, Bosnia and Herzegovina.

== Demographics ==
According to the 2013 census, its population was 100.

Ethnicity in 2013
Ethnicity	Number	Percentage
Bosniaks	86	86.0%
other/undeclared	14	14.0%
Total	100	100%
