= Brežani (Kakanj) =

Village in Kakanj, Bosnia and Herzegovina

Brežani Брежани
- Village
- Location within Bosnia and Herzegovina
- Coordinates: 44°06′N 18°09′E
- Country: Bosnia and Herzegovina
- Entity: Federation of Bosnia and Herzegovina
- Canton: Zenica-Doboj
- Municipality: Kakanj

Area
  - Total: 0.71 sq mi (1.84 km^{2})

Population (2013)
  - Total: 531
  - Density: 747/sq mi (289/km^{2})
- Time zone: UTC+1 (CET)
  - Summer (DST): UTC+2 (CEST)

Brežani (Cyrillic: Брежани) is a village in the municipality of Kakanj, Bosnia and Herzegovina. The village had a population of 531 as per the 2013 census. The majority of residents identify as Bosniaks, with a few belonging to other ethnic groups, including Croats and Serbs.

Kakanj, the municipality to which Brežani belongs, is part of a coal-mining region, however, Brežani itself is a quieter rural settlement.

== Demographics ==
According to the 2013 census, its population was 531.

Ethnicity in 2013
Ethnicity	Number	Percentage
Bosniaks	516	97.2%
Croats	7	1.3%
Serbs	2	0.4%
other/undeclared	6	1.1%
Total	531	100%
