= Rojin Potok =

Village in Kakanj, Bosnia and Herzegovina

Rojin Potok Ројин Поток
- Village
- Location within Bosnia and Herzegovina
- Country: Bosnia and Herzegovina
- Entity: Federation of Bosnia and Herzegovina
- Canton: Zenica-Doboj
- Municipality: Kakanj

Area
  - Total: 0.63 sq mi (1.62 km^{2})

Population (2013)
  - Total: 162
  - Density: 259/sq mi (100/km^{2})
- Time zone: UTC+1 (CET)
  - Summer (DST): UTC+2 (CEST)

Rojin Potok (Cyrillic: Ројин Поток) is a village in the municipality of Kakanj, Bosnia and Herzegovina.

== Demographics ==
According to the 2013 census, its population was 162.

Ethnicity in 2013
Ethnicity	Number	Percentage
Bosniaks	159	98.1%
other/undeclared	3	1.9%
Total	162	100%
