= Gornji Banjevac =

Village in Kakanj, Bosnia and Herzegovina

Gornji Banjevac Горњи Бањевац
- Village
- Location within Bosnia and Herzegovina
- Coordinates: 44°10′N 18°07′E
- Country: Bosnia and Herzegovina
- Entity: Federation of Bosnia and Herzegovina
- Canton: Zenica-Doboj
- Municipality: Kakanj

Area
  - Total: 0.66 sq mi (1.70 km^{2})

Population (2013)
  - Total: 166
  - Density: 253/sq mi (97.6/km^{2})
- Time zone: UTC+1 (CET)
  - Summer (DST): UTC+2 (CEST)

Gornji Banjevac (Cyrillic: Горњи Бањевац) is a village in the municipality of Kakanj, Bosnia and Herzegovina.

== Demographics ==
According to the 2013 census, its population was 166.

Ethnicity in 2013
Ethnicity	Number	Percentage
Bosniaks	118	71.1%
Croats	48	28.9%
Total	166	100%
