= Koprivnica, Bosnia and Herzegovina =

Village in Kakanj, Bosnia and Herzegovina

Koprivnica Копривница
- Village
- Location within Bosnia and Herzegovina
- Coordinates: 44°06′10″N 18°05′29″E
- Country: Bosnia and Herzegovina
- Entity: Federation of Bosnia and Herzegovina
- Canton: Zenica-Doboj
- Municipality: Kakanj

Area
  - Total: 0.94 sq mi (2.43 km^{2})

Population (2013)
  - Total: 243
  - Density: 259/sq mi (100/km^{2})
- Time zone: UTC+1 (CET)
  - Summer (DST): UTC+2 (CEST)

Koprivnica (Cyrillic: Копривница) is a village in the municipality of Kakanj, Bosnia and Herzegovina.

== Demographics ==
According to the 2013 census, its population was 243.

Ethnicity in 2013
Ethnicity	Number	Percentage
Bosniaks	233	95.9%
other/undeclared	10	4.1%
Total	243	100%
