= Bastašići =

Village in Kakanj, Bosnia and Herzegovina

Bastašići Басташићи
- Village
- Location within Bosnia and Herzegovina
- Coordinates: 44°10′N 18°12′E
- Country: Bosnia and Herzegovina
- Entity: Federation of Bosnia and Herzegovina
- Canton: Zenica-Doboj
- Municipality: Kakanj

Area
  - Total: 0.98 sq mi (2.55 km^{2})

Population (2013)
  - Total: 122
  - Density: 124/sq mi (47.8/km^{2})
- Time zone: UTC+1 (CET)
  - Summer (DST): UTC+2 (CEST)

Bastašići (Serbian Cyrillic: Басташићи) is a village in the municipality of Kakanj, Bosnia and Herzegovina.

== Demographics ==
According to the 2013 census, its population was 122, all Bosniaks.
