= Kučići (Kakanj) =

Village in Kakanj, Bosnia and Herzegovina

Kučići Кучићи
- Village
- Location within Bosnia and Herzegovina
- Coordinates: 44°10′25″N 18°05′18″E
- Country: Bosnia and Herzegovina
- Entity: Federation of Bosnia and Herzegovina
- Canton: Zenica-Doboj
- Municipality: Kakanj

Area
  - Total: 1.22 sq mi (3.16 km^{2})

Population (2013)
  - Total: 380
  - Density: 310/sq mi (120/km^{2})
- Time zone: UTC+1 (CET)
  - Summer (DST): UTC+2 (CEST)

Kučići (Cyrillic: Кучићи) is a village in the municipality of Kakanj, Bosnia and Herzegovina.

== Demographics ==
According to the 2013 census, its population was 380.

Ethnicity in 2013
Ethnicity	Number	Percentage
Bosniaks	376	98.8%
other/undeclared	4	1.1%
Total	380	100%
