= Kučići (Trebinje) =

Kučići Кучићи
- Village
- Location within Bosnia and Herzegovina
- Coordinates: 42°45′35″N 18°11′37″E
- Country: Bosnia and Herzegovina
- Entity: Republika Srpska
- Municipality: Trebinje
- Time zone: UTC+1 (CET)
  - Summer (DST): UTC+2 (CEST)

Kučići (Serbian Cyrillic: Кучићи) is a village in the municipality of Trebinje, Bosnia and Herzegovina.
