= Pavlovići (Kakanj) =

Village in Kakanj, Bosnia and Herzegovina

Pavlovići Павловићи
- Village
- Location within Bosnia and Herzegovina
- Coordinates: 44°05′49″N 18°12′23″E
- Country: Bosnia and Herzegovina
- Entity: Federation of Bosnia and Herzegovina
- Canton: Zenica-Doboj
- Municipality: Kakanj

Area
  - Total: 0.62 sq mi (1.61 km^{2})

Population (2013)
  - Total: 12
  - Density: 19/sq mi (7.5/km^{2})
- Time zone: UTC+1 (CET)
  - Summer (DST): UTC+2 (CEST)

Pavlovići (Cyrillic: Павловићи) is a village in the municipality of Kakanj, Bosnia and Herzegovina.

== Demographics ==
According to the 2013 census, its population was 12, all Croats.
