= Sopotnica (Kakanj) =

Village in Kakanj, Bosnia and Herzegovina

Sopotnica Сопотница
- Village
- Location within Bosnia and Herzegovina
- Coordinates: 44°07′03″N 18°00′04″E
- Country: Bosnia and Herzegovina
- Entity: Federation of Bosnia and Herzegovina
- Canton: Zenica-Doboj
- Municipality: Kakanj

Area
  - Total: 2.84 sq mi (7.36 km^{2})

Population (2013)
  - Total: 616
  - Density: 217/sq mi (83.7/km^{2})
- Time zone: UTC+1 (CET)
  - Summer (DST): UTC+2 (CEST)

Sopotnica (Cyrillic: Сопотница) is a village in the municipality of Kakanj, Bosnia and Herzegovina.

== Demographics ==
According to the 2013 census, its population was 616.

Ethnicity in 2013
Ethnicity	Number	Percentage
Bosniaks	602	97.7%
Serbs	1	0.2%
other/undeclared	13	2.1%
Total	616	100%
