= Ivnica =

Village in Kakanj, Bosnia and Herzegovina

Ivnica Ивница
- Village
- Location within Bosnia and Herzegovina
- Coordinates: 44°11′N 18°09′E
- Country: Bosnia and Herzegovina
- Entity: Federation of Bosnia and Herzegovina
- Canton: Zenica-Doboj
- Municipality: Kakanj

Area
  - Total: 0.86 sq mi (2.23 km^{2})

Population (2013)
  - Total: 241
  - Density: 280/sq mi (108/km^{2})
- Time zone: UTC+1 (CET)
  - Summer (DST): UTC+2 (CEST)

Ivnica (Cyrillic: Ивница) is a village in the municipality of Kakanj, Bosnia and Herzegovina.

== Demographics ==
According to the 2013 census, its population was 241.

Ethnicity in 2013
Ethnicity	Number	Percentage
Bosniaks	237	98.3%
Serbs	3	1.2%
other/undeclared	1	0.4%
Total	241	100%
