= Poljani (Kakanj) =

Village in Kakanj, Bosnia and Herzegovina

Poljani Пољани
- Village
- Location within Bosnia and Herzegovina
- Coordinates: 44°06′48″N 18°13′17″E
- Country: Bosnia and Herzegovina
- Entity: Federation of Bosnia and Herzegovina
- Canton: Zenica-Doboj
- Municipality: Kakanj

Area
  - Total: 4.02 sq mi (10.42 km^{2})

Population (2013)
  - Total: 63
  - Density: 16/sq mi (6.0/km^{2})
- Time zone: UTC+1 (CET)
  - Summer (DST): UTC+2 (CEST)

Poljani (Cyrillic: Пољани) is a village in the municipality of Kakanj, Bosnia and Herzegovina.

== Demographics ==
According to the 2013 census, its population was 63.

Ethnicity in 2013
Ethnicity	Number	Percentage
Bosniaks	38	60.3%
Croats	20	31.7%
Serbs	1	1.6%
other/undeclared	4	6.3%
Total	63	100%
