= Poljani, Grubišno Polje =

Poljani
- Village
- Location within Croatia
- Coordinates: 45.6816873°N 17.1500185°E
- Country: Croatia
- County: Bjelovar-Bilogora County
- Municipality: Grubišno Polje

Area
  - Total: 2.5 sq mi (6.4 km^{2})

Population (2021)
  - Total: 211
  - Density: 85/sq mi (33/km^{2})
- Time zone: UTC+1 (CET)
  - Summer (DST): UTC+2 (CEST)

Poljani is a village in Croatia, Europe.

== Demographics ==
According to the 2021 census, its population was 211.
