= Poljani, Kreševo =

Village in Central Bosnia

Poljani
- Village
- Location within Bosnia and Herzegovina
- Coordinates: 43.8991176°N 18.0969318°E
- Country: Bosnia and Herzegovina
- Entity: Federation of Bosnia and Herzegovina
- Canton: Central Bosnia
- Municipality: Kreševo

Area
  - Total: 0.30 sq mi (0.78 km^{2})

Population (2013)
  - Total: 11
  - Density: 37/sq mi (14/km^{2})
- Time zone: UTC+1 (CET)
  - Summer (DST): UTC+2 (CEST)

Poljani is a village in the municipality of Kreševo, Bosnia and Herzegovina.

== Demographics ==
According to the 2013 census, its population was 11, all Croats.
