= Hrastovac, Bosnia and Herzegovina =

Village in Kakanj, Bosnia and Herzegovina

Hrastovac
- Village
- Location within Bosnia and Herzegovina
- Country: Bosnia and Herzegovina
- Entity: Federation of Bosnia and Herzegovina
- Canton: Zenica-Doboj
- Municipality: Kakanj

Area
  - Total: 1.90 sq mi (4.91 km^{2})

Population (2013)
  - Total: 205
  - Density: 108/sq mi (41.8/km^{2})
- Time zone: UTC+1 (CET)
  - Summer (DST): UTC+2 (CEST)

Hrastovac is a village in the municipality of Kakanj, Bosnia and Herzegovina.

== Demographics ==
According to the 2013 census, its population was 205.

Ethnicity in 2013
Ethnicity	Number	Percentage
Bosniaks	204	99.5%
other/undeclared	1	0.5%
Total	205	100%
