= Danci, Bosnia and Herzegovina =

Village in Kakanj, Bosnia and Herzegovina

Danci Данци
- Village
- Location within Bosnia and Herzegovina
- Coordinates: 44°11′36″N 18°06′42″E
- Country: Bosnia and Herzegovina
- Entity: Federation of Bosnia and Herzegovina
- Canton: Zenica-Doboj
- Municipality: Kakanj

Area
  - Total: 0.91 sq mi (2.35 km^{2})

Population (2013)
  - Total: 72
  - Density: 79/sq mi (31/km^{2})
- Time zone: UTC+1 (CET)
  - Summer (DST): UTC+2 (CEST)

Danci (Cyrillic: Данци) is a village in the municipality of Kakanj, Bosnia and Herzegovina.

== Demographics ==
According to the 2013 census, its population was 72.

Ethnicity in 2013
Ethnicity	Number	Percentage
Croats	58	80.6%
Bosniaks	13	18.1%
other/undeclared	1	1.4%
Total	72	100%
