= Tršće, Bosnia and Herzegovina =

Village in Kakanj, Bosnia and Herzegovina

Tršće
- Village
- Location within Bosnia and Herzegovina
- Coordinates: 44°11′N 18°08′E
- Country: Bosnia and Herzegovina
- Entity: Federation of Bosnia and Herzegovina
- Canton: Zenica-Doboj
- Municipality: Kakanj

Area
  - Total: 2.13 sq mi (5.52 km^{2})

Population (2013)
  - Total: 768
  - Density: 360/sq mi (139/km^{2})
- Time zone: UTC+1 (CET)
  - Summer (DST): UTC+2 (CEST)

Tršće is a village in the municipality of Kakanj, Bosnia and Herzegovina.

== Demographics ==
According to the 2013 census, its population was 768.

Ethnicity in 2013
Ethnicity	Number	Percentage
Bosniaks	741	96.5%
Croats	20	2.6%
other/undeclared	7	0.9%
Total	768	100%
