= Kakanj =

Town in Bosnia and Herzegovina

- Town and municipality
- Coat of arms

- Location of Kakanj within Bosnia and Herzegovina.
- Coordinates: 44°07′52″N 18°05′50″E
- Country: Bosnia and Herzegovina
- Entity: Federation of Bosnia and Herzegovina
- Canton: Zenica-Doboj

Government
  - Municipal mayor: Mirnes Bajtarević (SDA)

Area
  - Municipality: 376.98 km^{2} (145.55 sq mi)

Population (2013 census)
  - Municipality: 37,441
  - Density: 99.318/km^{2} (257.23/sq mi)
  - Urban: 11,796
- Time zone: UTC+1
  - Summer (DST): UTC+2 (CEST)
- Postal code: 72,240
- Area code: +387 32
- Website: www.kakanj.com.ba

Kakanj (Serbian Cyrillic: Какањ) is a town and municipality located in Zenica-Doboj Canton of the Federation of Bosnia and Herzegovina, an entity of Bosnia and Herzegovina.

As of 2013, the town has a population of 11,796 inhabitants, with 38,937 inhabitants in the municipality. It is situated in central Bosnia and Herzegovina, north of Visoko and southeast of Zenica. It was built along the slopes of wide hills on either side of the Zgošća river.

== History ==
Neolithic artifacts have been found in Obre, a nearby village. Thus, whole culture that covered central Bosnian river basins was named Kakanj culture. It is Europe's oldest continuously inhabited settlement, carbon dated to 6795 BC.

Settlements in the region are very ancient and contain historical landmarks of the early Bosnian state. Kraljeva Sutjeska, a Franciscan monastery, is of particular historical note. Near the monastery is Bobovac, scene of the last stand of Bosnian Queen Katarina Kosača and medieval residence of Bosnian kings. In Kraljeva Sutjeska is one of the oldest mosques in Bosnia, built by order of Sultan Mehmed II the Victorious during his expedition to Bosnia and conquest of Bobovac. The Kakanj area enjoyed a renaissance during the rule of the Kotromanić dynasty.

One of the most beautiful tombs ever found in Bosnia, with a carving of a hunting cavalier, was found in Kakanj; it is currently displayed in the botanic garden of The State Museum in Sarajevo.

Kakanj was mentioned in 1468 as a settlement with 90 houses. The Kakanj coal mine was founded in 1900 under Austro-Hungarian rule around a developing coal mine, which began production in 1902. In the next hundred years, Kakanj developed organically without any urban planning, initially around the coal mine, and later along the banks of the Zgošća and Bosna rivers.

The town was also home to Rudstroj, a manufacturer of mining and industrial equipment that was part of the Kakanj brown-coal mine until 1993; it was privatized in 2002 and entered bankruptcy in 2017.

=== Bosnian War (1992–95) ===
The situation in Kakanj at the beginning of the Bosnian War was rather quiet, confronted with the frontlines in the area of Zavidovići. The town was in the middle of the Bosnian government-controlled territory, along the communication path with Zenica. Most of the Serb minority soon left the town, while Bosniak refugees from Serb-controlled towns arrived.

Between March and June 1994, Croats and Bosniaks signed the Washington Agreement, forming the Federation of Bosnia-Herzegovina. The situation in Kakanj improved, but refugees did not came back. Health and sanitation conditions were poor; a hepatitis epidemic was recorded in 1994. Food Security was under control, thanks to humanitarian aid, even though the overall prices remained prohibitive and most of the families survived with company-organized distribution and kitchen gardens. Almost all productive activities were stopped.

=== Post-war ===
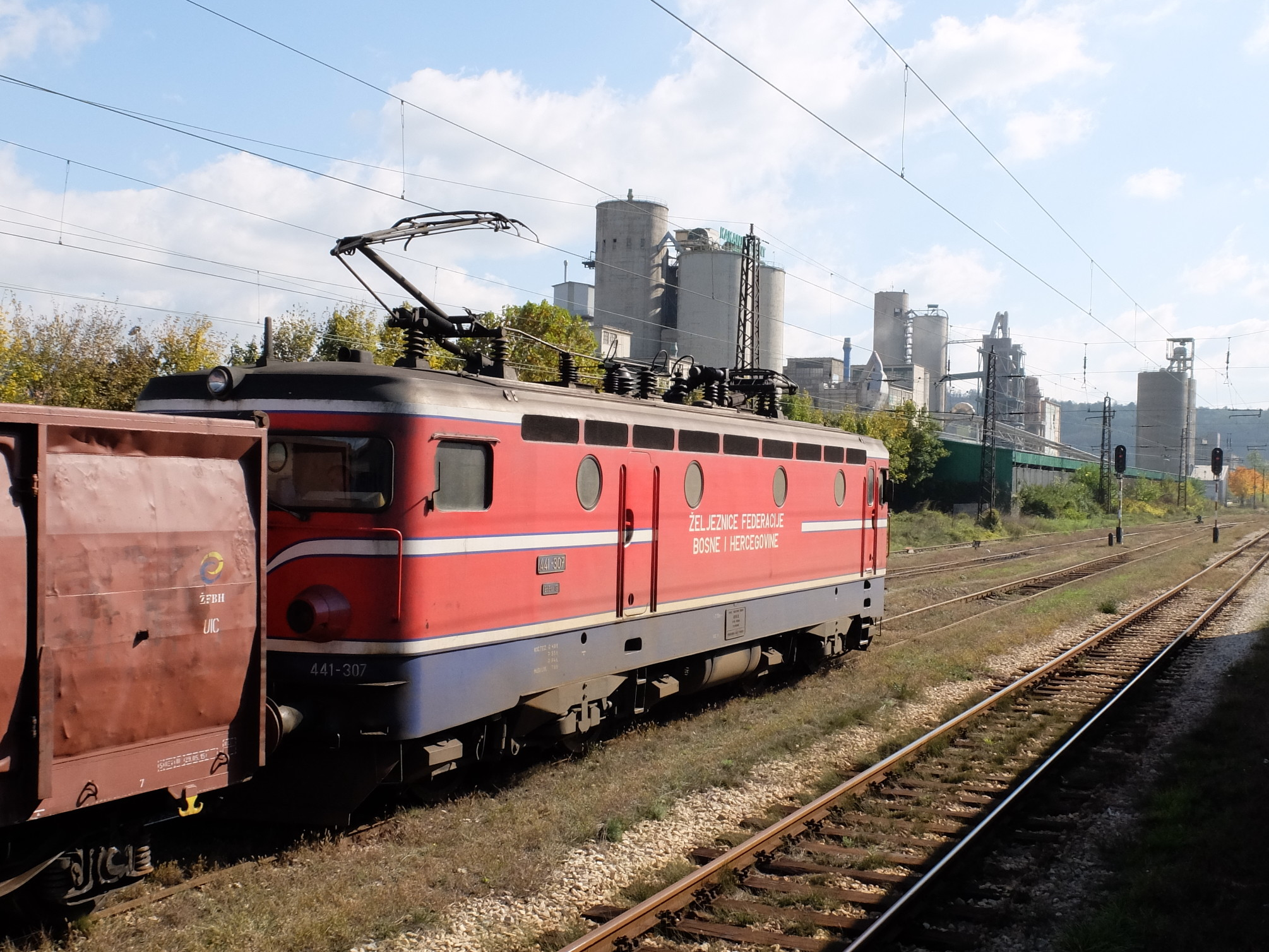
Cement factory

On 29 September 1999, the High Representative (OHR) Wolfgang Petrisch removed from office the mayor of Kakanj, Kemal Brodilija, for obstructing the implementation of the Dayton Agreements and pursuing an extra-legal agenda.

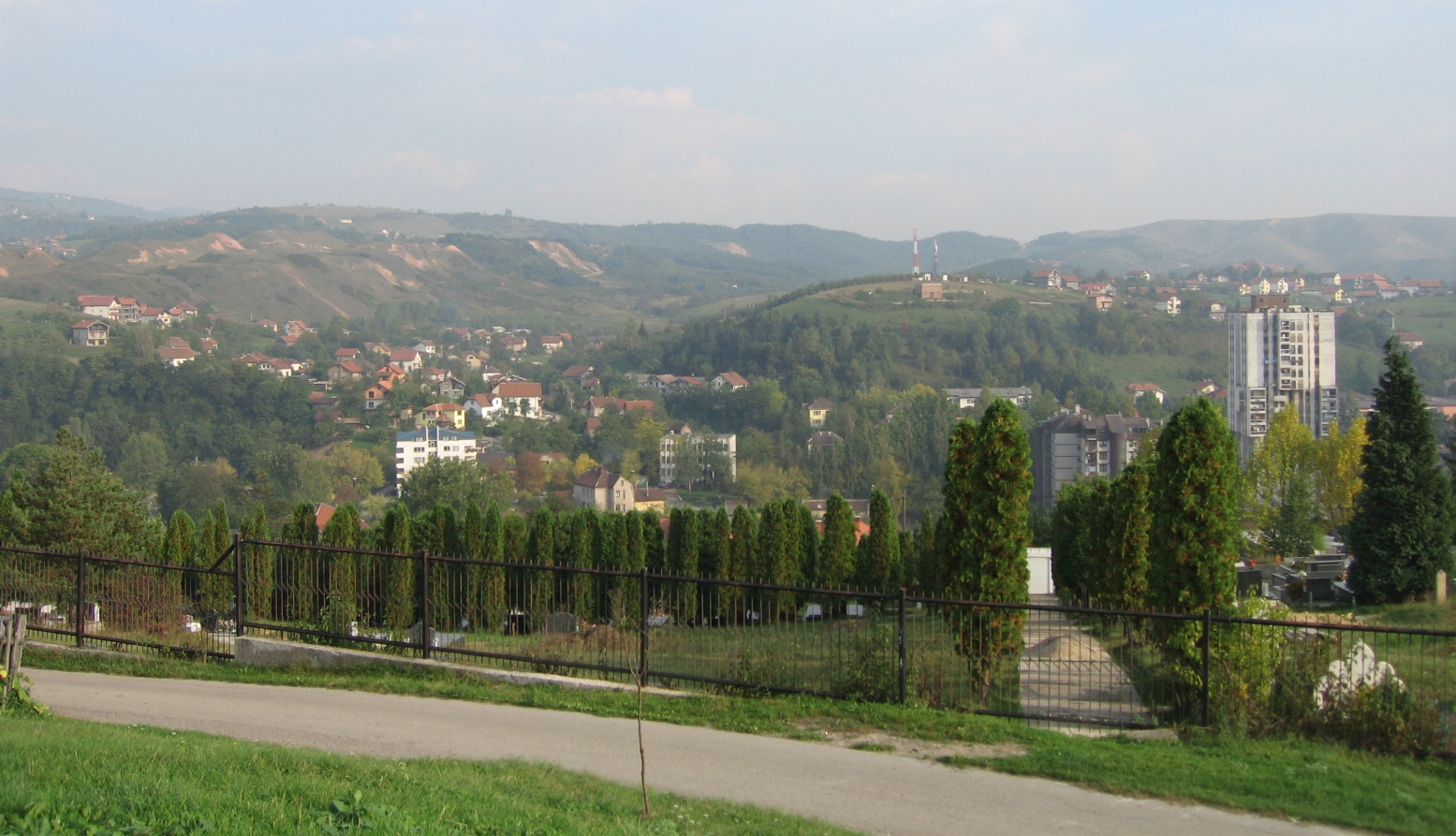
View of Kakanj

== Settlements ==
The municipality consists of following settlements: Alagići • Bastašići • Bašići • Bičer • Bijele Vode • Bijelo Polje • Bilješevo • Bistrik-Crkvenjak • Bištrani • Bjelavići • Bosna • Brežani • Brnj • Brnjic • Bukovlje • Crnač • Čatići • Danci • Desetnik • Doboj • Donja Papratnica • Donji Banjevac • Donji Kakanj • Donji Lučani • Dračići • Drijen • Dubovo Brdo • Dumanac • Gora • Gornja Papratnica • Gornji Banjevac • Gornji Lučani • Govedovići • Gradac • Groce • Halinovići • Haljinići • Hausovići • Hodžići • Hrasno • Hrastovac • Ivnica • Javor • Jehovina • Jerevice • Jezero • Kakanj • Karaula • Karaulsko Polje • Klanac • Kondžilo • Koprivnica • Kraljevska Sutjeska • Krševac • Kučići • Kujavče • Lipnica • Lučići • Lukovo Brdo • Marijina Voda • Miljačići • Mioči • Modrinje • Mramor • Nažbilj • Obre • Papratno • Pavlovići • Pedići • Podbjelavići • Podborje • Poljani • Poljice • Pope • Popržena Gora • Ratanj • Ribnica • Ričica • Rojin Potok • Saranovići • Sebinje • Semetiš • Seoce • Slagoščići • Slapnica • Slivanj • Slivnice • Sopotnica • Starposle • Subotinje • Termoelektrana • Teševo • Tičići • Tršće • Turalići • Turbići • Varalići • Veliki Trnovci • Viduša • Vrtlište • Vukanovići • Zagrađe • Zgošća • Zlokuće • Željeznička Stanica Kakanj • Živalji.

== Demographics ==
Town of Kakanj, 1991 census; total: 12,008
1. Muslims (Note: Today predominantly identified as ethnic Bosniaks) 4,977 (41.4%)
2. Croats 2,387 (19.9%)
3. Serbs 2,053 (17.1%)
4. Yugoslavs 1,841 (15.3%)
5. others 750 (6.24%)
Town of Kakanj, 2013 census; total:11,796
1. Bosniaks 9,408 (79.8%)
2. Croats 959 (8.10%)
3. Serbs 205 (1.70%)
4. others 1,224 (10.4%)

Population of Kakanj municipality
year of census	2013	1991.	1981.	1971.
Bosniaks	32,341 (86,4%)	30,528 (54,56%)	27,393 (52,55%)	25,142 (52,84%)
Croats	2,973 (7,9%)	16,556 (29,59%)	16,016 (30,72%)	15,479 (32,53%)
Serbs	281 (0,8%)	4,929 (8,80%)	5,182 (9,94%)	6,233 (13,10%)
Yugoslavs		2,554 (4,56%)	2,298 (4,40%)	301 (0,63%)
others and unknown	1,846 (4,9%)	1,383 (2,47%)	1,238 (2,37%)	425 (0,89%)
total	37,441	55,950	52,127	47,580

In the census of 1991, the town of Kakanj itself had 12,008 inhabitants.

=== Ethnic structure by settlements, 1991 census ===
Absolute ethnic majority:

Bosniaks
Croats
Serbs

Relative ethnic majority:

Bosniaks

Village	total	Bosniaks	Croats	Serbs	Yugoslavs	others
Alagići	94	61	23	9	1	0
Bastašići	74	67	7	0	0	0
Bašići	200	200	0	0	0	0
Bičer	379	315	0	54	7	3
Bijele Vode	288	216	0	67	3	2
Bijelo Polje	477	55	392	0	19	11
Bilješevo	239	1	1	233	0	4
Bistrik - Crkvenjak	404	59	340	0	4	1
Bištrani	574	339	229	1	3	2
Bjelavići	724	0	688	1	5	30
Bosna	63	0	0	63	0	0
Brežani	692	603	78	1	6	4
Brnj	710	490	209	0	8	3
Brnjic	820	820	0	0	0	0
Bukovlje	1,608	640	917	0	35	16
Crnač	599	332	266	1	0	0
Čatići	1,448	534	815	12	42	45
Danci	62	0	0	56	6	0
Desetnik	522	355	0	166	0	1
Doboj	2,516	1,973	154	171	131	87
Donja Papratnica	565	542	0	21	0	2
Donji Banjevac	145	0	133	8	1	3
Donji Kakanj	60	57	0	0	3	0
Donji Lučani	114	0	0	114	0	0
Dračići	33	0	0	33	0	0
Drijen	106	105	0	0	0	1
Dubovo Brdo	268	268	0	0	0	0
Dumanac	607	522	0	67	10	8
Gora	501	284	196	0	16	5
Gornja Papratnica	142	90	0	25	1	26
Gornji Banjevac	408	132	274	0	2	0
Gornji Lučani	400	315	1	81	3	0
Govedovići	217	3	212	2	0	0
Gradac	21	21	0	0	0	0
Groce	272	267	0	5	0	0
Halinovići	154	154	0	0	0	0
Haljinići	815	15	754	3	21	22
Hausovići	131	120	1	10	0	0
Hodžići	491	491	0	0	0	0
Hrasno	473	468	0	0	2	3
Hrastovac	299	299	0	0	0	0
Ivnica	257	246	0	10	0	1
Javor	149	131	0	18	0	0
Jehovina	171	4	0	164	1	2
Jerevice	272	265	0	1	6	0
Jezero	159	144	1	11	3	0
Kakanj	12,008	4,977	2,387	2,053	1,841	750
Karaula	173	136	1	35	1	0
Karaulsko Polje	292	179	7	91	9	6
Klanac	134	0	134	0	0	0
Kondžilo	42	0	0	39	3	0
Koprivnica	267	266	0	0	1	0
Kraljevska Sutjeska	852	45	752	2	29	24
Krševac	462	456	0	1	1	4
Kučići	472	470	2	0	0	0
Kujavče	268	267	0	0	1	0
Lipnica	274	173	98	0	3	0
Lučići	228	104	122	0	0	2
Lukovo Brdo	244	32	212	0	0	0
Marijina Voda	725	188	487	2	8	40
Miljačići	318	44	262	1	2	9
Mioči	182	57	0	122	1	2
Modrinje	635	506	0	122	6	1
Mramor	232	231	0	0	0	1
Nažbilj	299	284	12	0	3	0
Obre	507	464	7	1	5	30
Papratno	114	8	105	0	0	1
Pavlovići	334	1	327	1	0	5
Pedići	465	463	0	0	0	2
Podbjelavići	730	190	455	9	50	26
Podborje	202	192	1	1	2	6
Poljani	1,325	91	1,216	2	2	14
Poljice	139	0	135	4	0	0
Pope	715	604	88	1	17	5
Popržena Gora	343	261	0	80	0	2
Ratanj	350	0	324	0	16	10
Ribnica	119	116	0	0	0	3
Ričica	820	471	345	0	2	2
Rojin Potok	204	163	29	1	3	8
Saranovići	29	0	0	29	0	0
Sebinje	133	133	0	0	0	0
Semetiš	165	164	0	0	0	1
Seoce	878	93	753	1	20	11
Slagoščići	57	0	57	0	0	0
Slapnica	836	257	557	2	12	8
Slivanj	211	210	0	0	1	0
Slivnice	453	316	26	62	40	9
Sopotnica	720	673	0	47	0	0
Starposle	393	393	0	0	0	0
Subotinje	148	79	0	67	1	1
Termoelektrana	202	111	17	35	38	1
Teševo	351	0	351	0	0	0
Tičići	940	578	1	342	11	8
Tršće	799	698	68	32	0	1
Turalići	339	336	0	0	0	3
Turbići	226	0	217	0	5	4
Varalići	612	609	0	0	1	2
Veliki Trnovci	577	255	311	0	9	2
Viduša	90	31	0	59	0	0
Vrtlište	399	396	0	0	1	2
Vukanovići	642	0	637	0	1	4
Zagrađe	375	372	0	0	3	0
Zgošća	960	666	209	60	23	2
Zlokuće	263	255	0	0	0	8
Željeznička Stanica Kakanj	628	270	23	217	38	80
Živalji	327	191	130	0	5	1
total	55,950	30,528	16,556	4,929	2,554	1,383

== Sport ==
- Football club FK Rudar Kakanj
- Volleyball club OK Kakanj
- Basketball club KK Kakanj

== Notable people ==
- Aida Redžepagić, photographer
- Amar Jašarspahić, Bosnian singer
- Amel Tuka, middle-distance runner and World Championships silver medalist
- Denial Ahmetović, singer
- Kornelija Kvesić, basketball player
- Dženan Čišija, Swedish politician
- Mladen Bartulović, footballer
- Sasa Palamarevic, water polo player

== See also ==
- 1934 Kakanj mine disaster
- 1965 Kakanj mine disaster
