= Crnotina =

Crnotina is a geographical and historic region located in Sarajevo, Bosnia and Herzegovina. Most of it is located in the Sarajevan municipalities of Novi Grad Sarajevo, Ilijaš, Ilidža and Vogošča. it contains the towns of Ahatovići, Bojnik, Bioča Donja, Bioča Gornja, Dobroševići, Dvor, Mihaljevići, Reljevo, Rječica, Smiljevići and Zabrđe and partially include Rajlovac, Sokolje, Doglodi and Otes.

== History ==
Pre-Ottoman Crnotina was part of Vrhbosna and under the domain of the Bosnian duke Radoslav Pavlović, under whose service were Tvrtko Mihaljević and Stjepan Dobrošević (Where the towns of Mihaljevići and Dobroševići get their name). During Ottoman rule we find the first documentet mention of this place, Crnotina was mentioned as a village with military houses and barracks that belongs to Sarajevo, first time mentioned in the population census of the Sanjak of Bosnia from 1468 to 1469 and again in the census of 1604. During Ottoman rule several Sarajevan noble families had domains in this region, notably the families of Alajbegovići, Bakarevići, Filipovići, Memiševići, Mutevelići, Uzunići, Svrzo and others. During the early rule of the Ottomans in Sarajevo we trace the figure of Ahat-beg, who is believed to be the founder of Ahatovići.

== Geography ==
Crnotina is located North of Sarajevsko Polje (English:Sarajevo Field) above the Bosna river, it is characterised with its large hills, rich forests and fertile lands. The largest peaks are the hills Strahoč (782m) and Krstac (861m), both located in Ahatovići.

== Demographics ==
Population of the local communities located within the area of Crnotina, 2013 population census
Local Community (Mjesna Zajednica)	Towns included	Bosniaks	Serbs	Croats	Others/ Undeclared	Total
Dobroševići	Dobroševići, Ahatovići, Bojnik	5,411	73	83	106	5,673
Reljevo	Reljevo, Rječica	290	19	6	17	332
Naselje Heroja Sokolje	Zabrđe, Smiljevići, Sokolje	7,400	31	30	189	7,650
Bioča	Gornja Bioča, Donja Bioča	278	1	0	13	292
=== Total population ===		13,379 (95.93%)	124 (0.89%)	119 (0.85%)	325 (2.33%)	13,947
