= Ahatovići (Novi Grad Sarajevo) =

Neighbourhood in Sarajevo, Bosnia and Herzegovina

- Neighborhood
- Location within Bosnia and Herzegovina
- Coordinates: 43°53′06″N 18°16′51″E
- Country: Bosnia and Herzegovina
- Entity: Federation of Bosnia and Herzegovina
- Canton: Sarajevo
- Municipality: Novi Grad, Sarajevo
- Time zone: UTC+1 (CET)
  - Summer (DST): UTC+2 (CEST)

Ahatovići is a neighbourhood in Sarajevo, Bosnia and Herzegovina, located in the Novi Grad municipality.

The neighbourhood is located in the historical region of Crnotina near Saraj Polje at the harbors of the Bosna river. To the north of the Ahatovići are hills of Strahoč (782m) and Krstac (861m). Ahatovići borders the neighbourhoods of Dobroševići and Reljevo and the villages of Bojnik and Rečica.

== History ==
The settlement was founded by a Bosniak noble named Ahat-beg during the Ottoman rule in the country. The village of Ahatovići was the only Muslim majority village in Crnotina, where a mekteb existed. The construction of the Ahatovići mosque was completed in 1973, but was destroyed on June 4, 1992, after it was occupied by the Serbs during the Bosnian War. A successful reconstruction of the mosque took place in 2007.

In 1992, the Ahatovići massacre took place in this neighbourhood during the Siege of Sarajevo.

== Demographics ==
Since the 1991 census, Ahatovići has been incorporated into the inhabited urban area of Sarajevo. Ahatovići, alongside the villages of Dobroševići and Bojnik is a part of the Local Community "Dobroševići" (Mjesna zajednica Dobroševići) which has a population of 5,673 according to the 2013 census.

Demographics of Ahatovići 1948-2013
	1948	1953	1961	1971	1981	1991	2013
Total	278	347	680	656	621	*	*
