= Dolac =

Dolac may refer to:

In Bosnia and Herzegovina

- Dolac, Busovača, a village in the municipality of Busovača
- Dolac, Glamoč, a village in the municipality of Glamoč
- Dolac, Travnik, a village in the municipality of Travnik
- Dolac, Zavidovići, a village in the municipality of Zavidovići

In Croatia

- Dolac Market, a farmers' market in Zagreb, Croatia
- Dolac, Požega-Slavonia County, a village near Brestovac
- Primorski Dolac, a village in inland Dalmatia near Trogir
- Donji Dolac, a village in inland Dalmatia near Omiš
- Gornji Dolac, a village in inland Dalmatia near Omiš

In Montenegro

- Dolac, Berane, a town in the municipality of Berane
- Dolac, Bijelo Polje, a village in the municipality of Bijelo Polje

In Serbia

- Dolac (settlement), Bela Palanka, a village in the municipality of Bela Palanka
- Dolac (village), Bela Palanka, a village in the municipality of Bela Palanka
- Dolac, Kraljevo, a village in the municipality of Kraljevo
- Dolac (Novi Pazar), a village in the municipality of Novi Pazar

Surname

- Shaun Dolac (born 2001), American football player
