= Ars Aevi bridge =

Bridge over Miljacka in Sarajevo, Bosnia and Herzegovina

Ars Aevi bridge Ars Aevi most
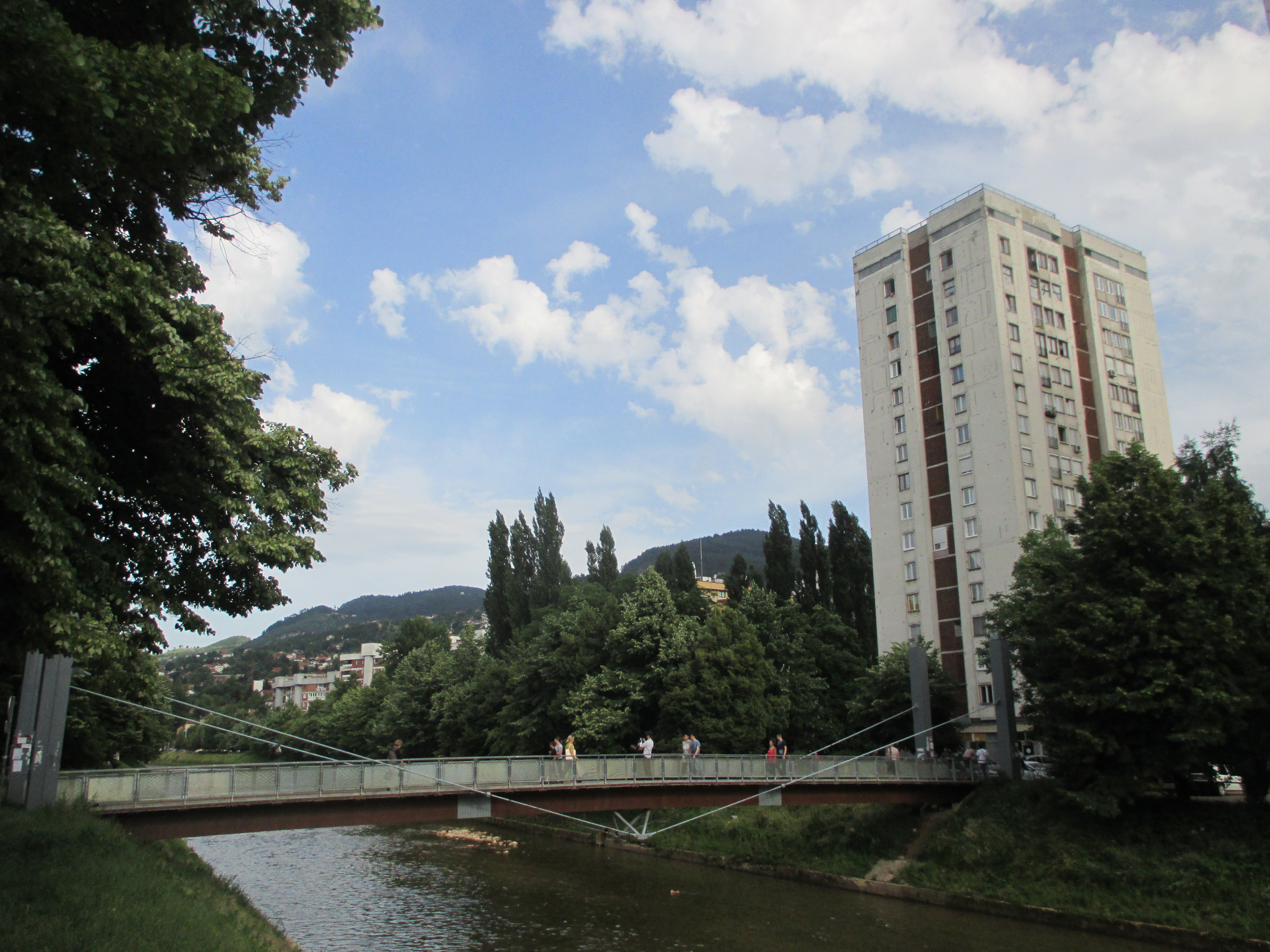
- Ars Aevi bridge
- Coordinates: 43°51′12″N 18°24′03″E
- Carries: Pedestrians and bicycles
- Crosses: Miljacka

Location
- Interactive map of Ars Aevi bridge

The Ars Aevi Bridge is located in Sarajevo, Bosnia and Herzegovina, and spans the Miljacka River. It connects the Grbavica neighborhood at the eastern bank with the Vilsonovo Šetalište (Wilson's Promenade). It was designed by Renzo Piano, in his capacity as a UNESCO Goodwill Ambassador. In 2002, the Ars Aevi Bridge by Renzo Piano was opened, leading citizens to the location of the Ars Aevi Museum/Center.

The bridge is a starting point and a "signpost" that should show where the Ars Aevi museum of contemporary art is located, where works by renowned artists from all over the world will be collected.

== Sources ==
- Katolički tjednik
- Informativni medij 1
- Informativni medij 2
