= Novo Sarajevo =

Coordinates: 43°52′8″N 18°24′31″E

Novo Sarajevo Ново Сарајево New Sarajevo
- Municipality
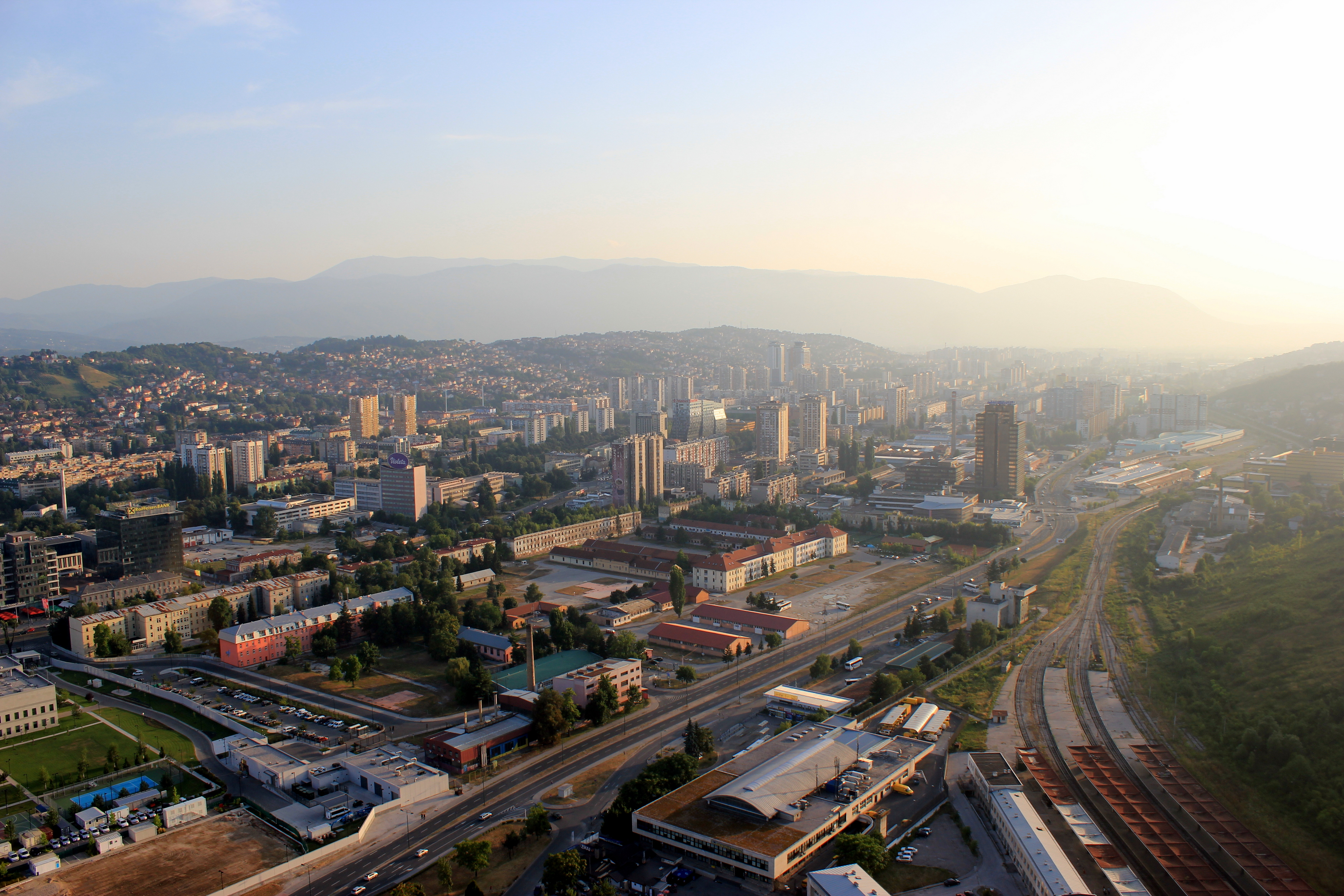
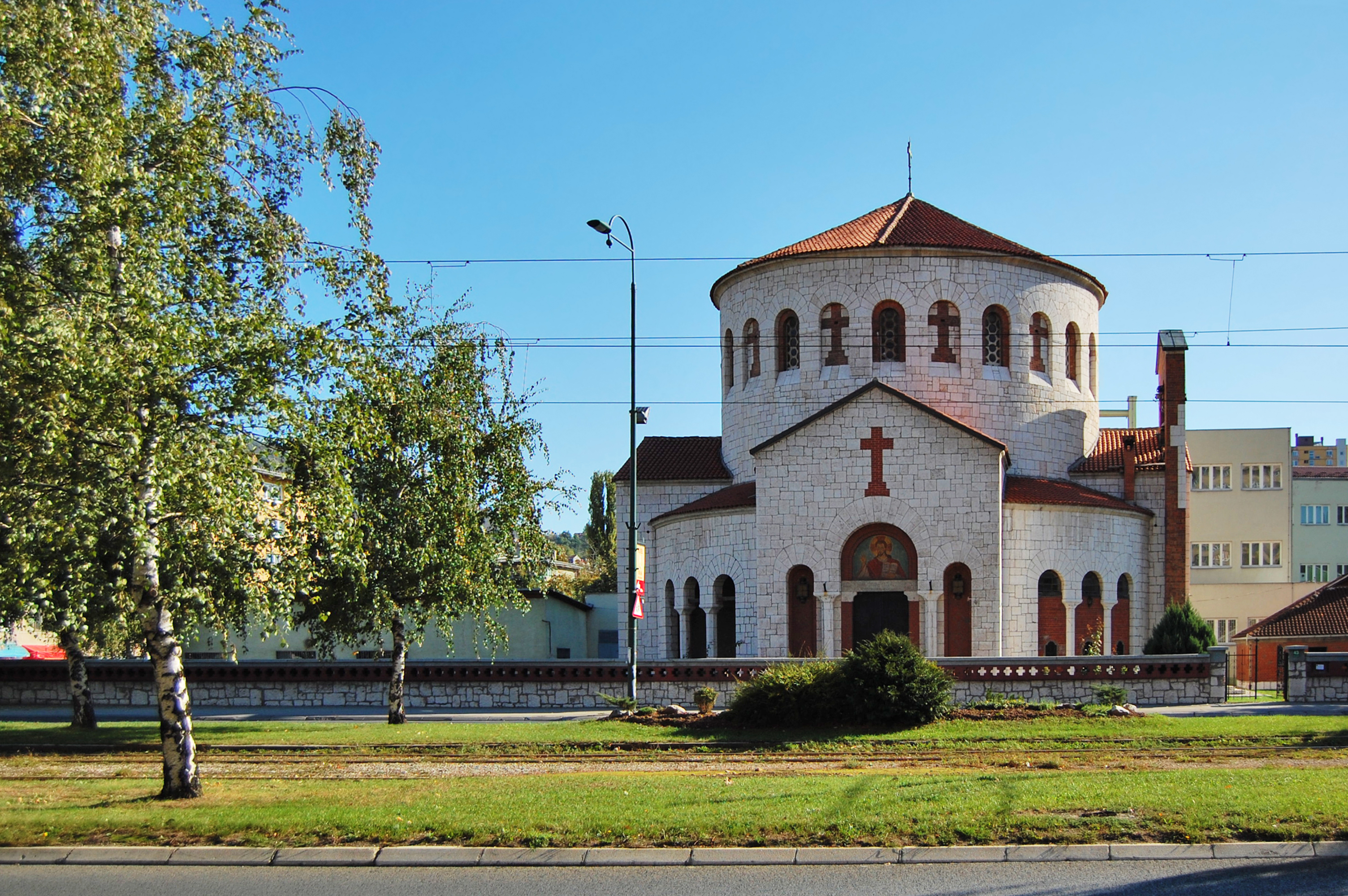
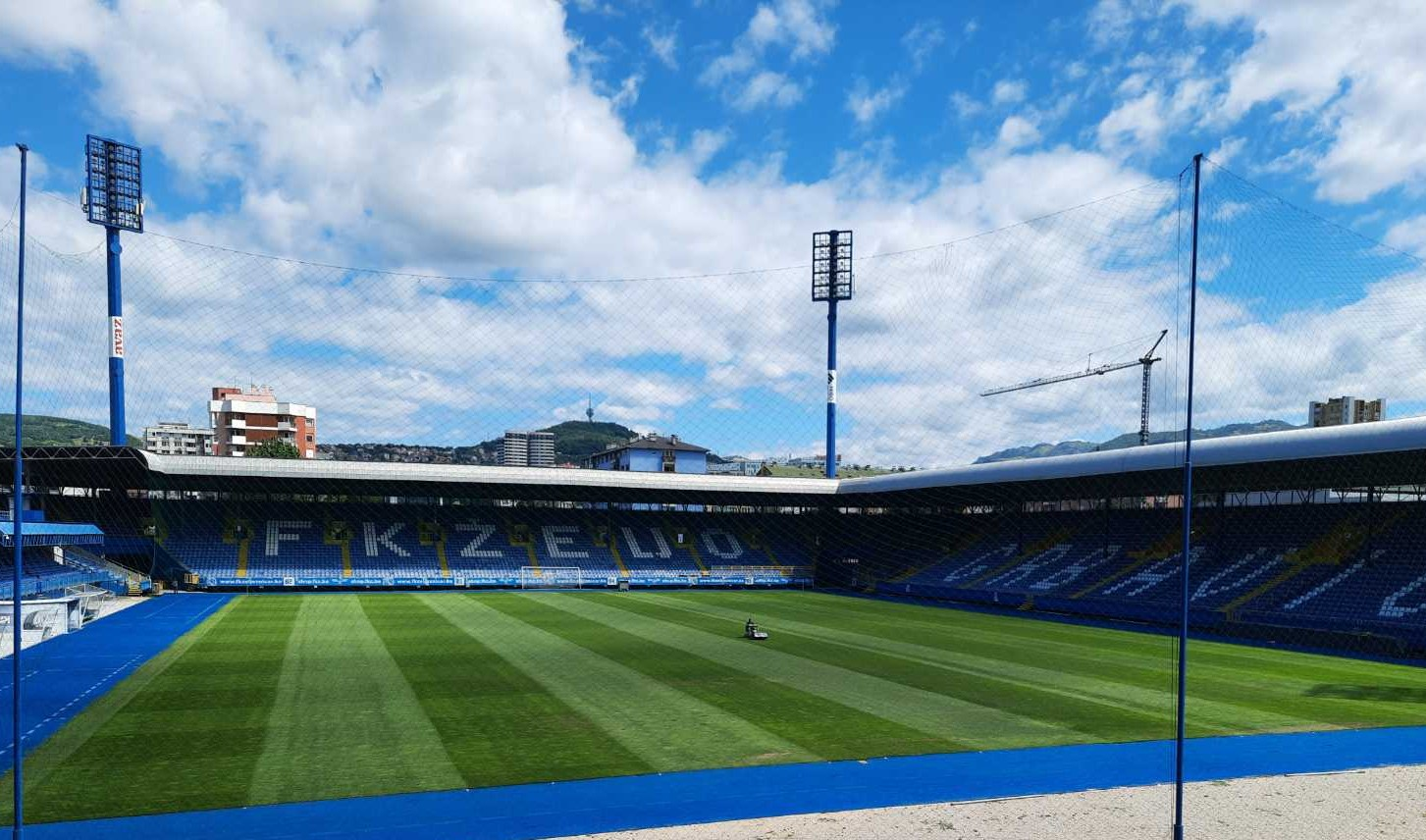
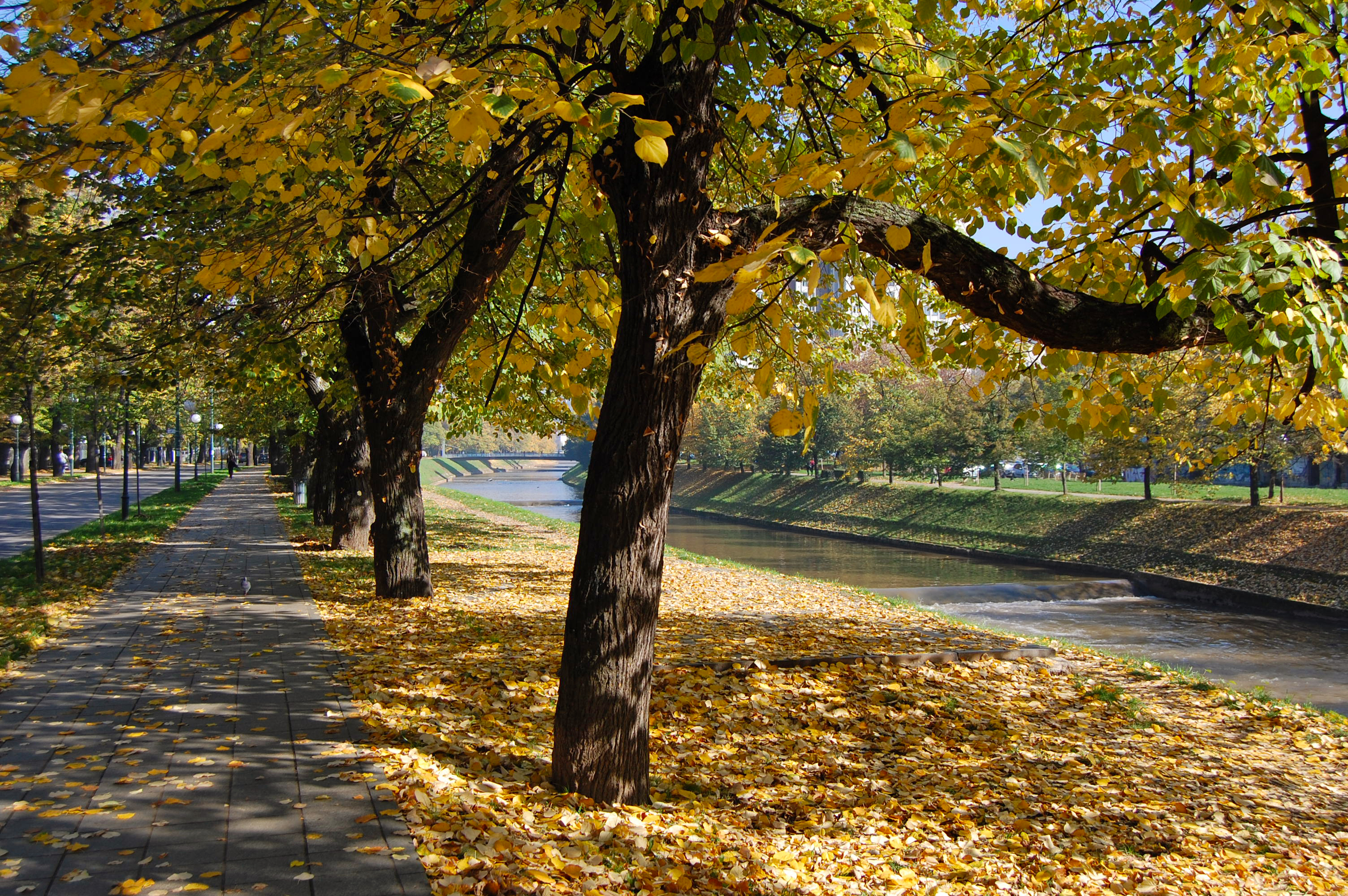
- Novo Sarajevo skyline Church of the Holy Transfiguration Municipality headquarters Grbavica Stadium Vilsonovo Šetalište

- Coat of arms

- Location of Novo Sarajevo within Bosnia and Herzegovina.
- Country: Bosnia and Herzegovina
- Entity: Federation of Bosnia and Herzegovina
- Canton: Sarajevo Canton
- City: Sarajevo
- Status: Urban
- Communities: 18

Government
  - Municipal mayor: Benjamina Karić (SDP BiH)

Area
  - Total: 9.9 km^{2} (3.8 sq mi)

Population (2013 census)
  - Total: 64,814
  - Density: 6,949.7/km^{2} (18,000/sq mi)
- Time zone: UTC+1 (CET)
  - Summer (DST): UTC+2 (CEST)
- Area code: +387 33
- Website: http://www.novosarajevo.ba

Novo Sarajevo (Ново Сарајево, pronounced [nôvoː sǎrajevo]; lit. 'New Sarajevo') is a municipality of the city of Sarajevo, Bosnia and Herzegovina.

== Local Communities ==
Novo Sarajevo consists of the following 18 local communities:

1. Dolac
2. Malta
3. Velešići
4. Gornji Velešići
5. Čengić Vila I
6. Čengić Vila II
7. Grbavica I
8. Grbavica II
9. Kovačići
10. Gornji Kovačići
11. Kvadrant
12. Trg Heroja
13. Željeznička
14. Vraca
15. Pofalići I
16. Pofalići II
17. Hrasno
18. Hrasno Brdo

== History ==
Like Novi Grad, Novo Sarajevo is a product of the city's massive growth and development in the 1960s and 1970s. It is located in the middle of the Sarajevo field, predominantly on the northern bank of the Miljacka, between Novi Grad and Centar.

Prior to the siege of Sarajevo, Novo Sarajevo had some 47.6 km^{2} (41.6% Forest, 17.5% Meadows, 13.5% Commercial/Building Land, 10.4% Grass-land, 8.4% Ploghland, 13.5% Gardens). Following the siege, 75% of the lesser populated urban area was transferred to Istočno Novo Sarajevo, leaving Novo Sarajevo municipality with 11.43 km^{2}. As a result, Novo Sarajevo has the highest number of people per km^{2}, some 7,524.

== Economy ==
Novo Sarajevo is known as something of the commercial and business center of Sarajevo, housing many of the city's major companies and corporations such as Elektroprivreda Bosne i Hercegovine, the University of Sarajevo, UN house Bosnia and Herzegovina and also the HQ of Sparkasse Bank and the Raiffeisen Bank in Bosnia and Herzegovina.

Novo Sarajevo is considered to be the second most developed municipality in the Federation of Bosnia and Herzegovina, boasting a per capita GDP of some US$11,000 (275.2% of FBiH average GDP), just behind the municipality of Centar, Sarajevo. These two municipalities combine for 60.9% of the Sarajevo Canton GDP, even though they account for merely 3.5% of the total area of Sarajevo Canton, and 27% of its population.

== Politics ==
The municipal mayor of Novo Sarajevo is Benjamina Karić from the Social Democratic Party.

The municipal council has 31 seats in total, which are allocated as follows:

1. Social Democratic Party - 6 seats
2. Party of Democratic Action - 6 seats
3. Our Party - 5 seats
4. People and Justice - 4 seats
5. Party for Bosnia and Herzegovina - 4 seats
6. Democratic Front - 2 seats
7. Independent - 2 seats
8. People's European Union - 1 seat
9. Forward - 1 seat

== Sites of interests ==
- Historical Museum of Bosnia and Herzegovina (Historijski Muzej Bosne i Hercegovine)
- Vilsonovo Šetalište – popular promenade and recreation area (Wilson's Promenade)
- Suada and Olga bridge – bridge is a monument to Suada Dilberović and Olga Sučić, the first victims shot at the beginning of the siege of Sarajevo.
- Church of the Holy Transfiguration
- Hum Tower – park and recreational zone
- Grbavica Stadium – (Stadium of FK Željezničar)
- University of Sarajevo Campus
- ROBOT Shopping Centar Novo Sarajevo
- Konzum Family Centar Sarajevo (ex. Mercator)
- Embassy of the United States, Sarajevo
- Old Jewish Cemetery, Sarajevo

== Demographics ==
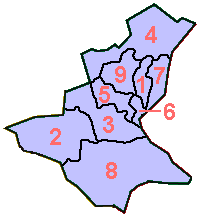
Novo Sarajevo is marked with number 6 on this map of the Sarajevo Canton.

=== 1971 ===
111,811 total

- Serbs – 45,806 (40.96%)
- Bosniaks – 37,147 (33.22%)
- Croats – 17,491 (15.64%)
- Yugoslavs – 5,798 (5.18%)
- Others – 5,569 (5.00%)

=== 1991 ===
95,089 total

- Bosniaks – 33,902 (35.7%)
- Serbs – 32,899 (34.6%)
- Yugoslavs – 15,580 (16.4%)
- Croats – 8,798 (9.3%)
- Others – 4,391 (4.6%)

=== 2013 ===
64,814 total

- Bosniaks – 48,188 (74.34%)
- Croats – 4,639 (7.15%)
- Serbs – 3,402 (5.24%)
- Others – 8,585 (13.24%)
