= King Fahd Mosque (Sarajevo) =

Mosque in Sarajevo, Bosnia and Herzegovina

- Džamija kralja Fahda
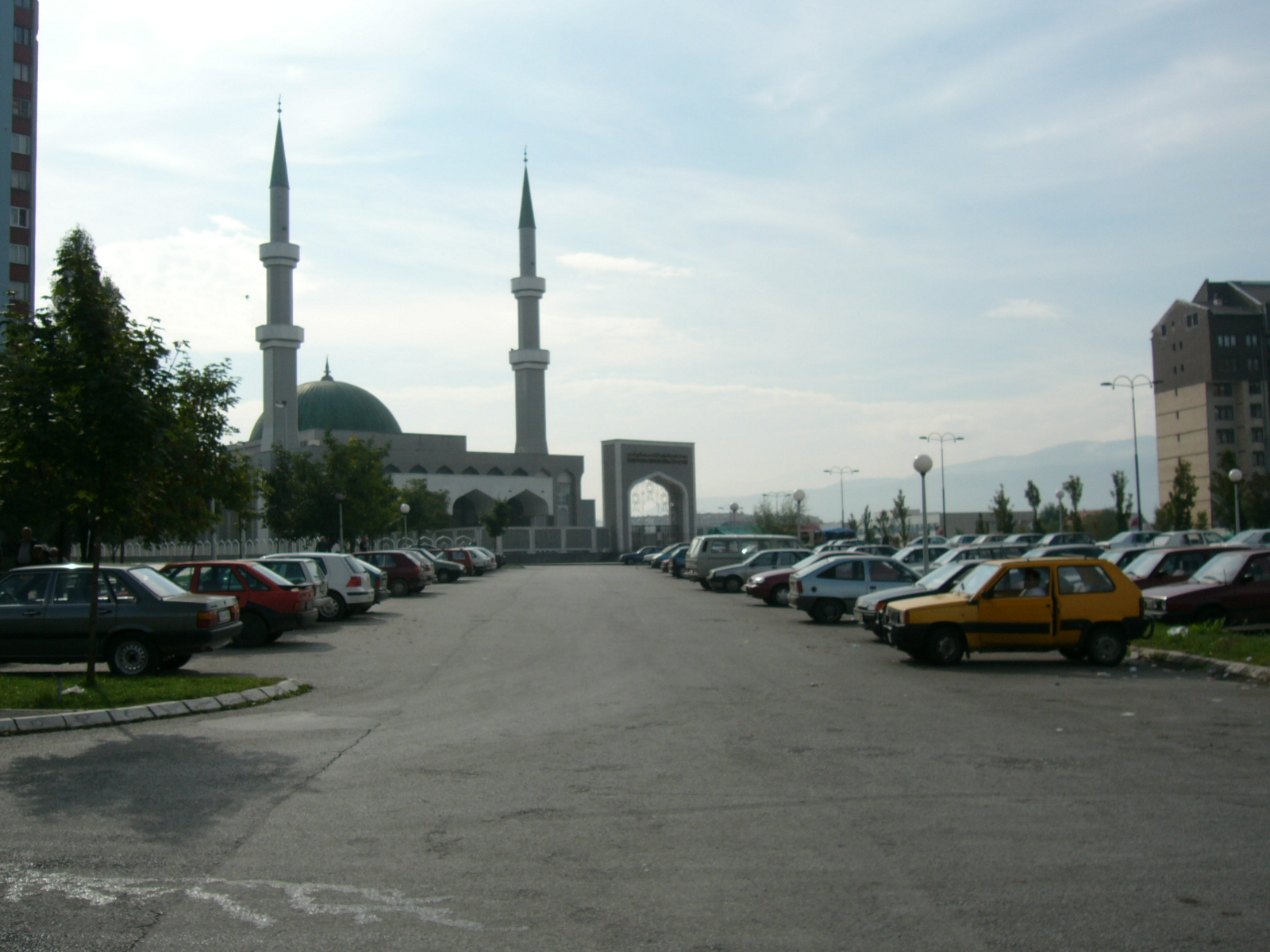
- The mosque, viewed from the parking lot

- Location of the mosque in Sarajevo

Religion
- Affiliation: Sunni Islam
- Ecclesiastical or organisational status: Mosque
- Status: Active

Location
- Location: Samira Fraste bb, Alipašino polje, Sarajevo
- Country: Bosnia and Herzegovina
- Interactive map of King Fahd Mosque
- Coordinates: 43°50′23″N 18°20′36″E

Architecture
- Type: Mosque
- Completed: 2000

Specifications
- Capacity: 1,500 worshipers
- Dome: 1
- Dome height (outer): 20 m (66 ft)
- Dome dia. (outer): 18 m (59 ft)
- Minaret: 2
- Minaret height: 46 m (151 ft)

The King Fahd Mosque (Bosnian: Džamija kralja Fahda), also known as King Fahd Bin Abdul Aziz Alsaud Mosque Bosnian: Džamija kralja Fahd Bin Abdul Aziz Alsauda), is a Sunni mosque, located in the Alipašino polje neighbourhood of Sarajevo, in Bosnia and Herzegovina. It was established and funded by Saudi Arabia, and is named in honour of Saudi King Fahd.

== Gallery ==
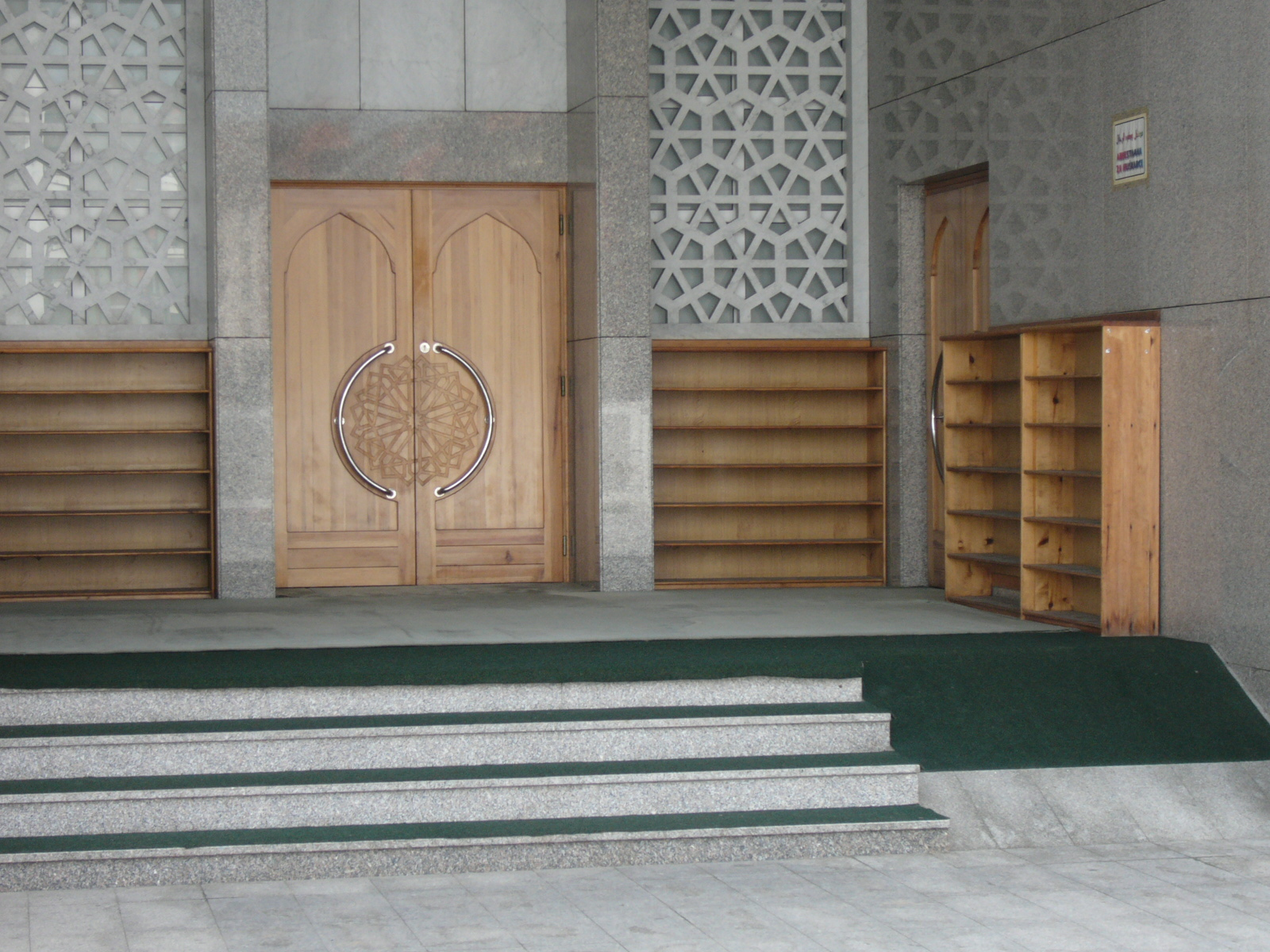
The front door of the mosque

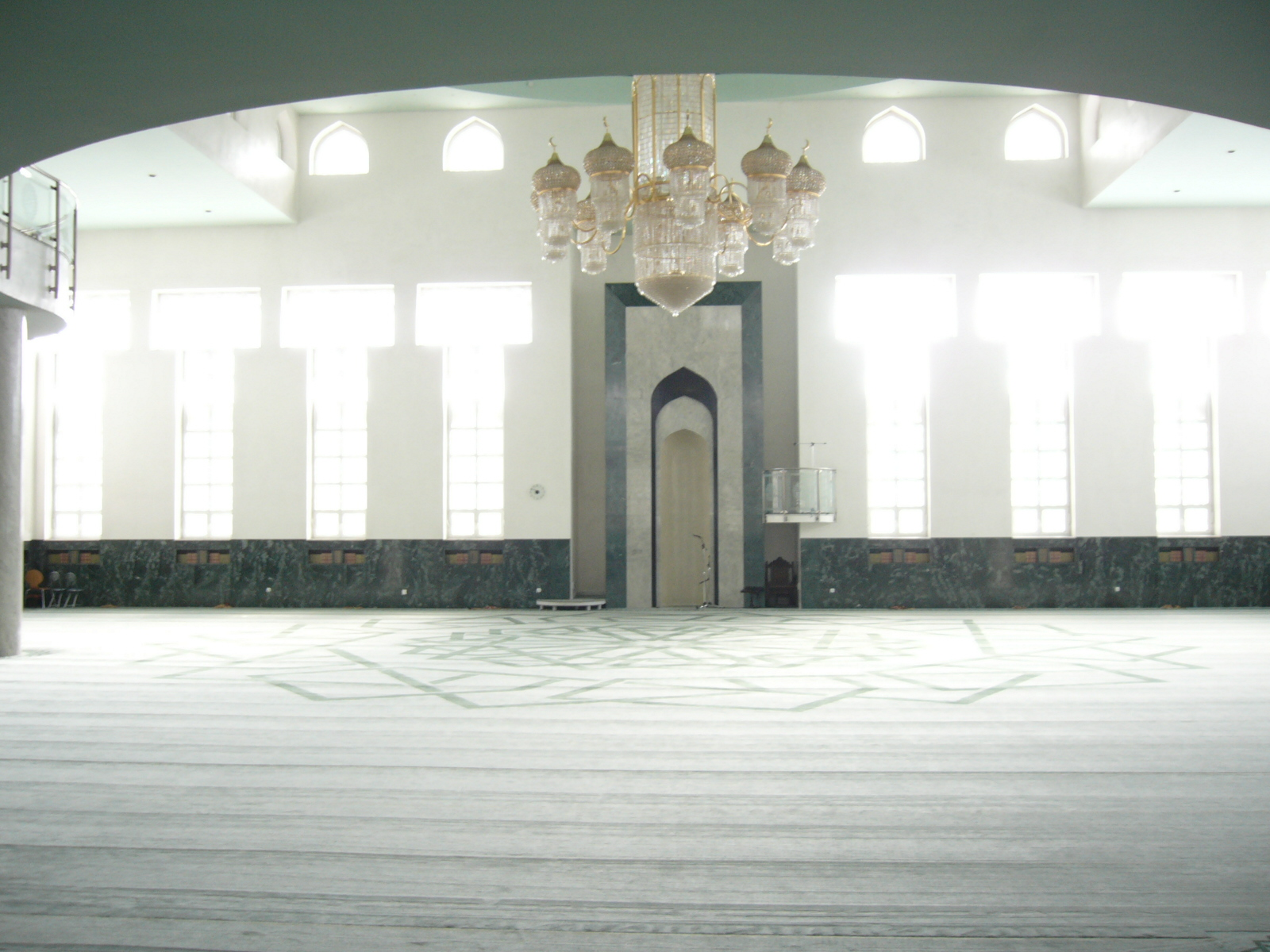
The mosque interior

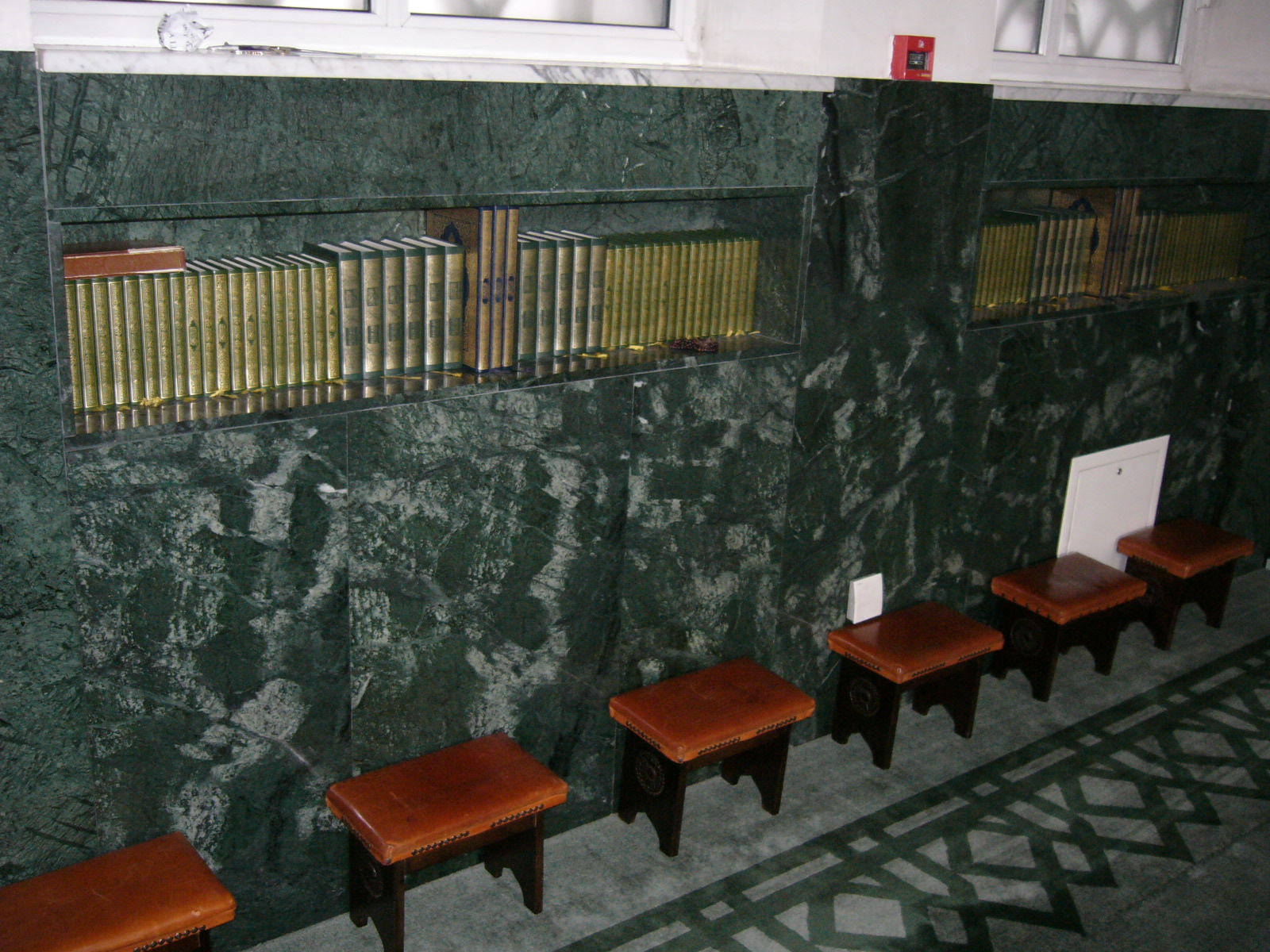
Religious books inside the mosque

== See also ==
- Islam in Bosnia and Herzegovina
- List of mosques in Bosnia and Herzegovina
- List of things named after Saudi King Fahd
- Bosnia and Herzegovina–Saudi Arabia relations
