= Novi Grad, Sarajevo =

Novi Grad Нови Град New Town
- Municipality
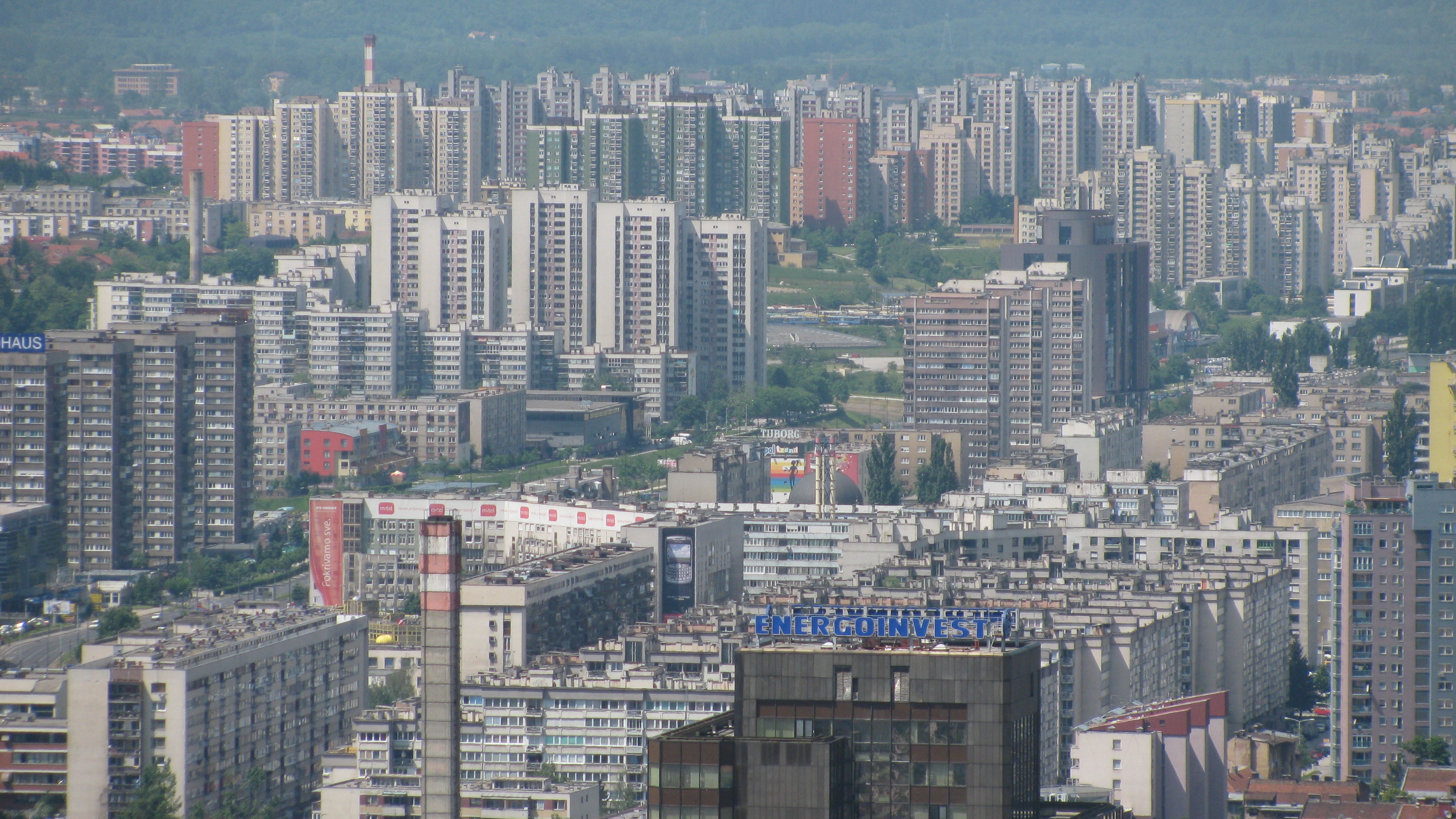
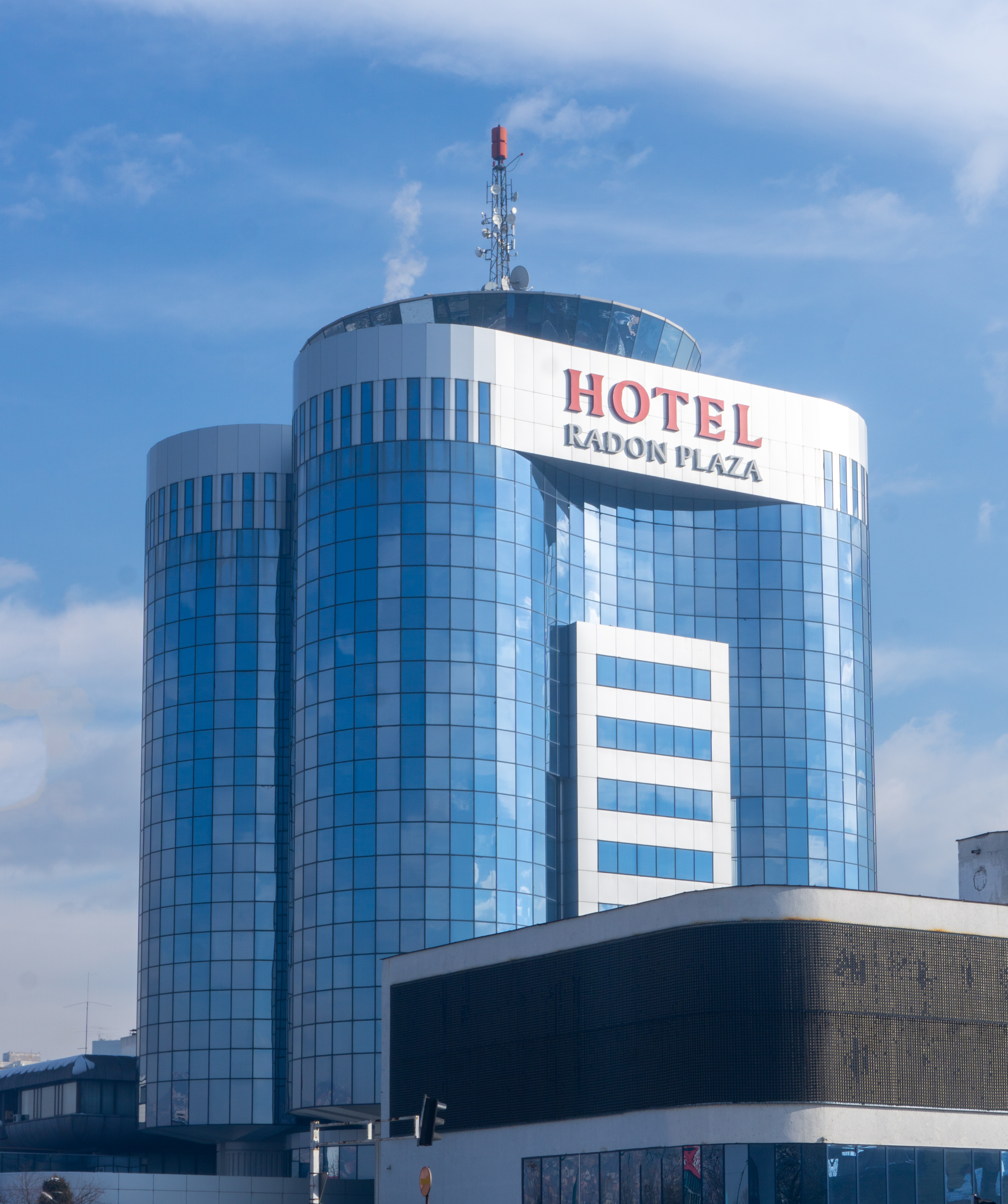
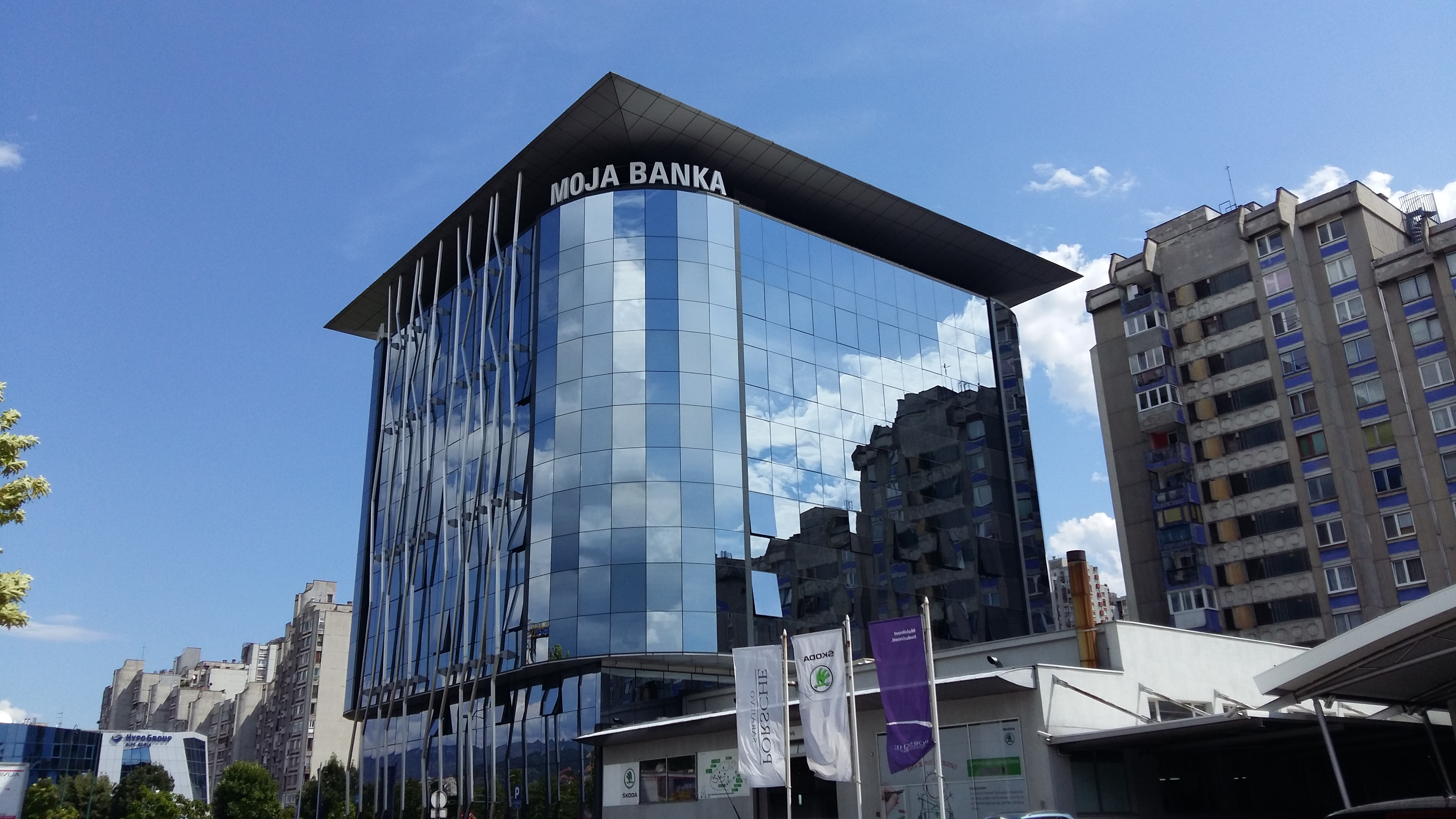
- Novi Grad skyline Hotel Radon Plaza Bosmal City Center Moja Banka Sarajevo

- Coat of arms

- Location of Novi Grad, Sarajevo within Bosnia and Herzegovina.
- Coordinates: 43°50′56″N 18°22′16″E
- Country: Bosnia and Herzegovina
- Entity: Federation of Bosnia and Herzegovina
- Canton: Sarajevo Canton
- City: Sarajevo
- Status: Urban
- Communities: 23

Government
  - Municipal mayor: Semir Efendić (SBiH)

Area
  - Total: 47.2 km^{2} (18.2 sq mi)

Population (2013 census)
  - Total: 118,553
  - Density: 2,637.1/km^{2} (6,830/sq mi)
- Time zone: UTC+1 (CET)
  - Summer (DST): UTC+2 (CEST)
- Area code: +387 33
- Website: www.novigradsarajevo.ba

Novi Grad (Serbian Cyrillic: Нови Град, pronounced [nôʋiː grâːd]; lit. "New Town") is a municipality of the city of Sarajevo, Bosnia and Herzegovina. It is the westernmost of the four municipalities that make up the city of Sarajevo. The municipality also consists of the villages Bojnik and Rečica.

== History ==
During the 1970s, Sarajevo was undergoing a rapid economic and cultural development, with great expansion focused on population and industry. Novi Grad was a direct result of this period of heavy growth, in which many acres of previously unused land were transformed into socialist urban centres filled with apartment buildings. By the time the Novi Grad municipality was formally recognized, it had some 60,000 citizens, in 18 neighbourhoods.

According to the 1991 census, the municipality of Novi Grad had 136,746 citizens. Four years of the Bosnian War brought that number down tremendously, as the Serb minority left the city. Of the municipality's 33,517 residential buildings, 92% were damaged during the Siege of Sarajevo.

Novi Grad has recovered since the Siege. Although many bullet holes and mortar shell impacts are visible throughout the municipality, it became overall a functioning city again. As the most modern part of Sarajevo, Novi Grad is also ground to many new developments, such as the Bosmal City Center.

== Politics ==
The municipal mayor of Novi Grad Sarajevo is Semir Efendić from Party for Bosnia and Herzegovina.

The municipal council has 31 seats in total, which are allocated as follows:

1. Party for Bosnia and Herzegovina - 11 seats
2. Party of Democratic Action - 7 seats
3. Social Democratic Party - 4 seats
4. Our Party - 3 seats
5. Bajro Biber - Aida Ožegović Councillors' Club - 2 seats
6. People and Justice - 2 seats
7. Democratic Front - 1 seat
8. Independent - 1 seat

== Demographics ==
=== 1971 ===
111,811 total

- Serbs - 45,806 (40.96%)
- Bosniaks - 37,147 (33.22%)
- Croats - 17,491 (15.64%)
- Yugoslavs - 5,798 (5.18%)
- Others - 5,569 (5.00%)

=== 1991 ===
136,616 total

- Bosniaks - 69,430 (50.82%)
- Serbs - 37,591 (27.51%)
- Croats - 8,889 (6.50%)
- Yugoslavs - 15,580 (11.40%)
- Others - 5,126 (3.77%)

=== 2002 ===
According to the 2002 estimate, today the municipality of Novi Grad has 122,636 citizens, of which around 94% are Bosniaks, 2% Serbs and 4% Croats.

=== 2005 ===
In 2005, 86% of the population of the municipality were ethnic Bosniaks.

=== 2013 ===
118,553 total

- Bosniaks - 99,773 (84.15%)
- Croats - 4,947 (4.17%)
- Serbs - 4,367 (3.68%)
- Others - 9,439 (7.96%)

== Local communities ==
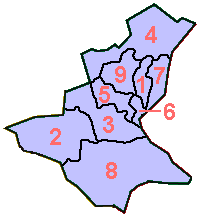
Novi Grad is marked with number 5 on this map of the Sarajevo Canton.

Novi Grad consists of the following 29 local communities:

1. Staro Hrasno
2. Čengić Vila
3. Otoka
4. Aneks
5. Švrakino Selo I
6. Švrakino Selo II
7. Švrakino Selo III
8. Alipašino Polje AI
9. Alipašino Polje AII
10. Alipašino Polje BI
11. Alipašino Polje BII
12. Alipašino Polje CI
13. Alipašino Polje CII
14. Olimpijsko Selo
15. Saraj Polje
16. Dobrinja A
17. Dobrinja B
18. Dobrinja C
19. Dobrinja D
20. Dolac
21. Buča Potok
22. Alipašin Most I
23. Alipašin Most II
24. Alipašin Most III
25. Briješće
26. Naselje heroja Sokolje
27. Dobroševići
28. Reljevo
29. Zabrđe
