= 1991 population census in Bosnia and Herzegovina =

Last census of the Socialist Republic

Population of Bosnia and Herzegovina in 1991 by nationality
1. ethnic Muslims (43.5%)
2. Serbs (31.2%)
3. Croats (17.4%)
4. Yugoslavs (5.54%)
5. Others (2.40%)

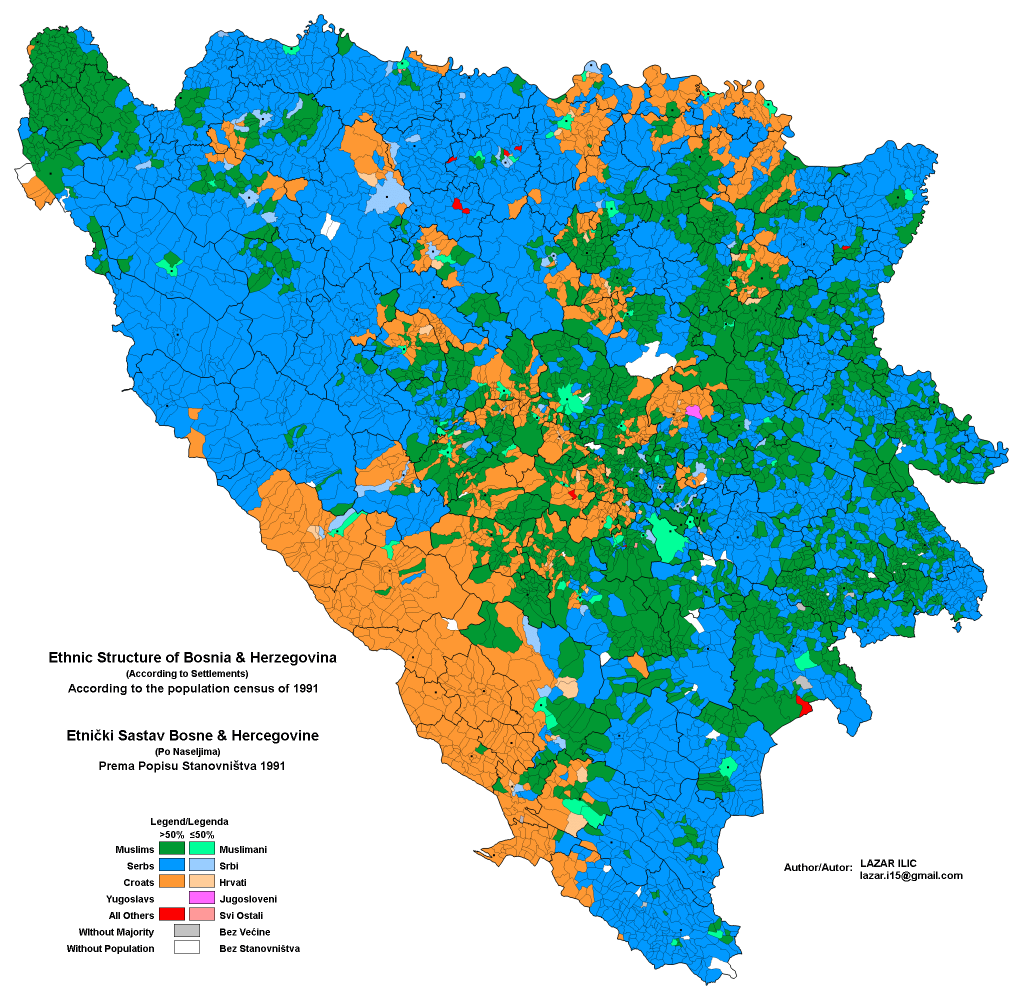
Ethnic composition by settlements

The 1991 population census in Bosnia and Herzegovina was the last census of the population undertaken in the Socialist Republic of Bosnia and Herzegovina before the Bosnian War. It was conducted during the final week of March 1991. For the 1991 census there were 109 municipalities of which ten were part of Sarajevo.

== Usage ==
As the next census of Bosnia and Herzegovina was not held until 2013, the 1991 census was used as the basis for institutionalized affirmative action practices in the country, which ensure equal or proportional representation of the country's "constituent peoples" (Bosniaks, Croats and Serbs) in public institutions. Due to the ethnic cleansing campaigns that took place during the 1992 to 1995 war, the data for ethnicity was expected to be highly inaccurate.

== Overall ==
Nationality	Size	Percent
Muslims (Note: The vast majority of ethnic Muslims today declare themselves Bosniaks.)	1.902.956	43.47%
Serbs	1.366.104	31.21%
Croats	760,852	17.38%
Yugoslavs	242,682	5.54%
Unknown	35,670	0.81%
Other	17,592	0.40%
Undecided	14,585	0.33%
Montenegrins	10,071	0.23%
Roma	8,864	0.20%
Albanians	4,295	0.10%
Ukrainians	3,929	0.09%
Slovenes	2,190	0.05%
Macedonians	1,596	0.03%
Italians	732	0.02%
Hungarians	893	0.02%
Czechs	590	0.01%
Jews	426	0.01%
Germans	470	0.01%
Poles	526	0.01%
Romanians	162	0.01%
Russians	297	0.01%
Ruthenians	133	0.01%
Slovaks	297	0.01%
Turks	267	0.01%
Regional	224	0.01%

== By municipality ==
Absolute ethnic majority

ethnic Muslims
Serbs
Croats

Relative ethnic majority

ethnic Muslims
Serbs
Croats

Municipality	Total	ethnic Muslims	Serbs	Croats	Yugoslavs	Other
Sarajevo	527,049	259,470	157,143	34,873	56,470	19,093
-Centar-	79,286	39,761	16,631	5,428	13,030	4,436
-Hadžići-	24,200	15,392	6,362	746	841	859
-Ilidža-	67,937	29,337	25,029	6,934	5,181	1,456
-Ilijaš-	25,184	10,585	11,325	1,736	1,167	371
-Novi Grad-	136,616	69,430	37,591	8,889	15,580	5,126
-Novo Sarajevo-	95,089	33,902	32,899	8,798	15,099	4,391
-Pale-	16,355	4,364	11,284	129	396	182
-Stari Grad-	50,744	39,410	5,150	1,126	3,374	1,684
-Trnovo-	6,991	4,790	2,059	16	72	54
-Vogošća-	24,647	12,499	8,813	1,071	1,730	534
Banovići	26,590	19,162	4,514	550	1,928	436
Banja Luka	195,692	28,558	106,826	29,026	23,656	7,626
Bihać	70,732	46,737	12,689	5,580	4,356	1,370
Bijeljina	96,988	30,229	57,389	492	4,426	4,452
Bileća	13,284	1,947	10,628	39	222	448
Bosanska Dubica	31,606	6,440	21,728	488	1,851	1,099
Bosanska Gradiška	59,974	15,851	35,753	3,417	3,311	1,642
Bosanska Krupa	58,320	43,104	13,841	139	708	528
Bosanski Brod	34,138	4,088	11,389	13,993	3,664	1,004
Bosanski Novi	41,665	14,040	25,101	403	1,557	564
Bosanski Petrovac	15,621	3,288	11,694	48	366	225
Bosanski Šamac	32,960	2,233	13,628	14,731	1,755	613
Bosansko Grahovo	8,311	12	7,888	226	135	50
Bratunac	33,619	21,535	11,475	40	223	346
Brčko	87,627	38,617	18,128	22,252	5,731	2,899
Breza	17,317	13,079	2,122	851	1,001	264
Bugojno	46,889	19,697	8,673	16,031	1,561	927
Busovača	18,879	8,451	623	9,093	510	202
Cazin	63,409	61,693	778	139	430	369
Čajniče	8,956	4,024	4,709	5	77	141
Čapljina	27,882	7,672	3,753	14,969	1,047	441
Čelinac	18,713	1,446	16,554	76	377	260
Čitluk	15,083	111	19	14,823	17	113
Derventa	56,489	7,086	22,952	21,938	3,348	1,165
Doboj	102,549	41,164	39,820	13,264	5,765	2,536
Donji Vakuf	24,544	13,509	9,533	682	593	227
Drvar	17,126	33	16,608	33	384	68
Foča	40,513	20,790	18,315	94	463	851
Fojnica	16,296	8,024	157	6,623	407	1,085
Gacko	10,788	3,858	6,661	29	84	156
Glamoč	12,593	2,257	9,951	184	118	83
Goražde	37,573	26,296	9,843	80	789	565
Gornji Vakuf	25,181	14,063	110	10,706	158	144
Gračanica	59,134	42,599	13,558	132	1,530	1,315
Gradačac	56,581	33,856	11,221	8,613	1,436	1,455
Grude	16,358	4	9	16,210	5	130
Han Pijesak	6,348	2,543	3,674	7	68	56
Jablanica	12,691	9,099	504	2,291	581	216
Jajce	45,007	17,380	8,663	15,811	2,496	657
Kakanj	55,950	30,528	4,929	16,556	2,554	1,383
Kalesija	41,809	33,137	7,659	35	275	703
Kalinovik	4,667	1,716	2,826	17	46	62
Kiseljak	24,164	9,778	740	12,550	600	496
Kladanj	16,070	11,621	3,952	36	277	184
Ključ	37,391	17,696	18,506	330	579	280
Konjic	43,878	23,815	6,620	11,513	1,358	572
Kotor Varoš	36,853	11,090	14,056	10,695	745	267
Kreševo	6,731	1,531	34	4,714	251	201
Kupres	9,618	802	4,864	3,813	67	72
Laktaši	29,832	408	24,176	2,565	1,530	1,153
Livno	40,600	5,793	3,913	29,324	1,125	445
Lopare	32,537	11,990	18,243	1,263	583	458
Lukavac	57,070	38,080	12,169	2,159	3,424	1,238
Ljubinje	4,172	332	3,748	39	19	34
Ljubuški	28,340	1,592	65	26,127	227	329
Maglaj	43,388	19,569	13,312	8,365	1,508	634
Modriča	35,613	10,375	12,534	9,805	1,851	1,048
Mostar	126,628	43,856	23,846	43,037	12,768	3,121
Mrkonjić Grad	27,395	3,272	21,057	2,139	593	334
Neum	4,325	190	207	3,792	90	46
Nevesinje	14,448	3,313	10,711	210	123	91
Novi Travnik	30,713	11,625	4,097	12,162	2,132	697
Odžak	30,056	6,220	5,667	16,338	1,147	684
Olovo	16,956	12,699	3,193	642	285	137
Orašje	28,367	1,893	4,235	21,308	626	305
Posušje	17,134	6	9	16,963	26	130
Prijedor	112,543	49,351	47,581	6,316	6,459	2,836
Prnjavor	47,055	7,143	33,508	1,721	1,757	2,926
Prozor	19,760	7,225	45	12,259	100	131
Rogatica	21,978	13,209	8,391	19	186	173
Rudo	11,571	3,130	8,150	5	106	180
Sanski Most	60,307	28,136	25,363	4,322	1,247	1,239
Skender Vakuf	19,418	1,071	13,263	4,770	169	145
Sokolac	14,883	4,493	10,195	19	83	93
Srbac	21,840	940	19,382	140	811	567
Srebrenica	36,666	27,572	8,315	38	380	361
Srebrenik	40,896	30,528	5,308	2,752	1,203	1,105
Stolac	18,681	8,101	3,917	6,188	307	168
Šekovići	9,629	326	9,030	10	129	134
Šipovo	15,579	2,965	12,333	31	155	95
Široki Brijeg	27,160	9	148	26,864	20	119
Teslić	59,854	12,802	32,962	9,525	3,465	1,100
Tešanj	48,480	34,941	3,071	8,929	1,047	492
Tomislavgrad	30,009	3,148	576	25,976	107	202
Travnik	70,747	31,813	7,777	26,118	3,743	1,296
Trebinje	30,996	5,571	21,349	1,246	1,642	1,188
Tuzla	131,618	62,669	20,271	20,398	21,995	6,285
Ugljevik	25,587	10,241	14,468	56	290	532
Vareš	22,203	6,714	3,644	9,016	2,071	758
Velika Kladuša	52,908	48,305	2,266	740	993	604
Visoko	46,160	34,373	7,471	1,872	1,464	980
Višegrad	21,199	13,471	6,743	32	319	634
Vitez	27,859	11,514	1,501	12,675	1,377	792
Vlasenica	33,942	18,727	14,359	39	340	477
Zavidovići	57,164	34,198	11,640	7,576	2,726	1,024
Zenica	145,517	80,359	22,433	22,510	15,654	4,561
Zvornik	81,295	48,102	30,863	122	1,248	960
Žepče	22,966	10,820	2,278	9,100	546	222
Živinice	54,783	44,017	3,525	3,976	2,130	1,135
Total	4,377,033	1,902,956 (43.47%)	1,365,104 (31.21%)	760,852 (17.38%)	242,682 (5.54%)	104,439 (2.38%)

== See also ==
- Bosniaks
- Serbs of Bosnia and Herzegovina
- Croats of Bosnia and Herzegovina
- 1953 population census in Bosnia and Herzegovina
