= Hrasno =

Coordinates: 43°50′38″N 18°22′55″E

Hrasno Храсно
- Neighborhood
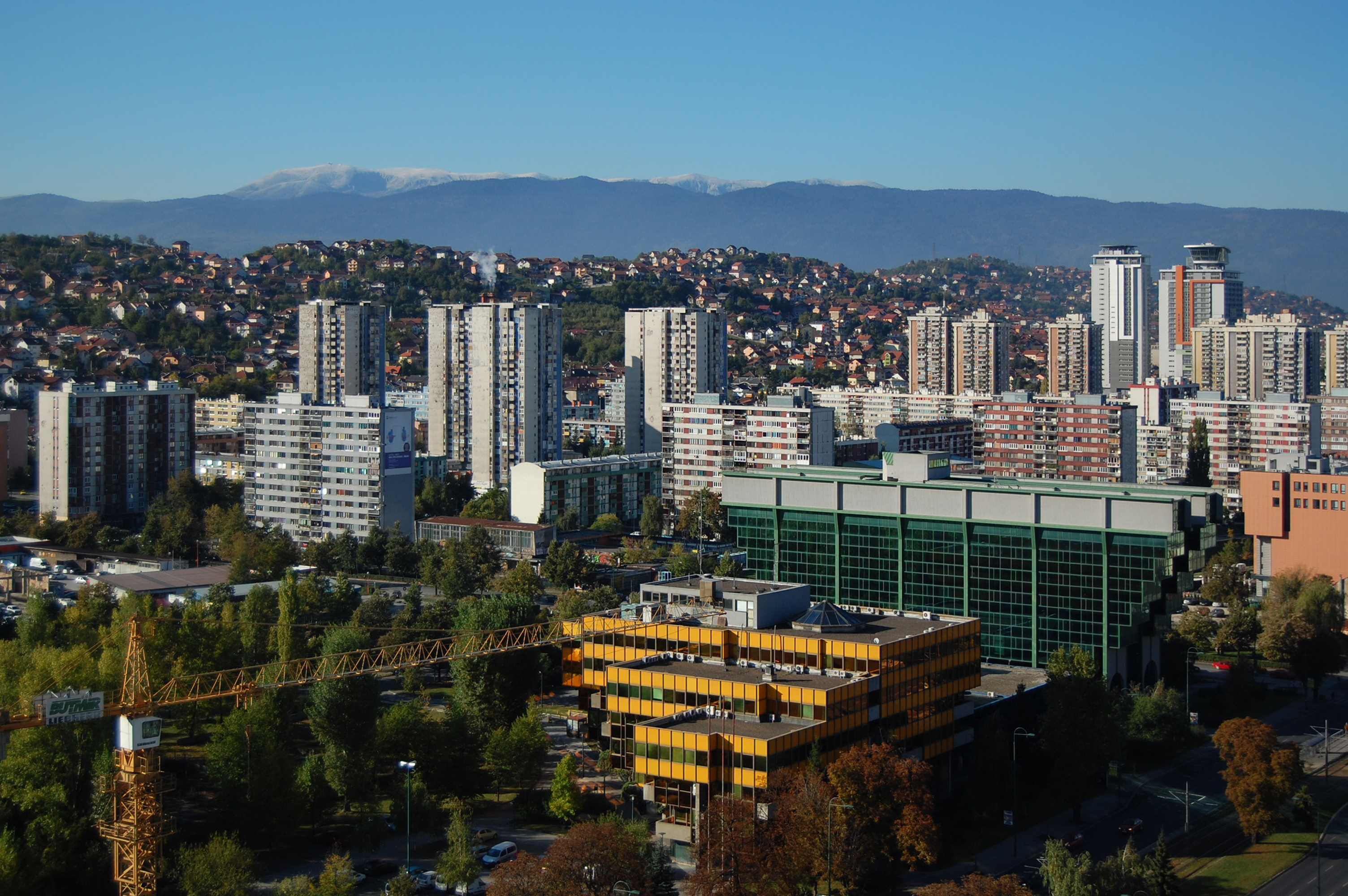
- Elektroprivreda, Bosmal City Center and their surroundings
- Interactive map of Hrasno
- Country: Bosnia and Herzegovina
- Entity: Federation of Bosnia and Herzegovina
- Time zone: UTC+1 (CET)
  - Summer (DST): UTC+2 (CEST)

Hrasno (Cyrillic: Храсно) is a neighbourhood in Sarajevo, Bosnia and Herzegovina. It is divided into four local communities: Hrasno, Staro Hrasno, Hrasno Brdo and Trg Heroja. Staro Hrasno is located in the municipality of Novi Grad, while the other three local communities are parts of the Novo Sarajevo municipality. Before the Bosnian War, Hrasno, Staro Hrasno and Trg Heroja were considered part of a single local community.

It is home of the fourth tallest skyscraper in the Balkans, known as the Bosmal City Center, which is located in Staro Hrasno.
