= 1953 population census in Bosnia and Herzegovina =

Population of Bosnia and Herzegovina in 1953 by nationality
1. Serbs (44.4%)
2. Yugoslavs, ethnically undeclared (mostly Yugoslav Muslims and Serbs ) (31.3%)
3. Croats (23.0%)
4. Others (1.34%)

The 1953 population census in Bosnia and Herzegovina was the second population census of the Socialist Federal Republic of Yugoslavia took place on March 31, 1953. The administrative organization of Bosnia and Herzegovina (51.221 km^{2}) was identical to the first census in the socialist Yugoslavia (1948), apart from the fact that the Odžak district had been abolished and merged with the district of Modriča.

== Results ==
- The number of inhabitants: 2,847,459
- Population density: 55.6 per km^{2}

== Overall ==
Nationality	Number	Percentage	Number change	Percentage change
Serbs	1,264,372	44.40%	▲128,256	▲0.11%
Yugoslavs, ethnically undeclared (mostly Yugoslav Muslims)	891,800	31.32%	unknown	unknown
Croats	654,229	22.97%	▲40,106	▼0.97%
Others	39,398	1.34%	▲12,763	▲0.30%

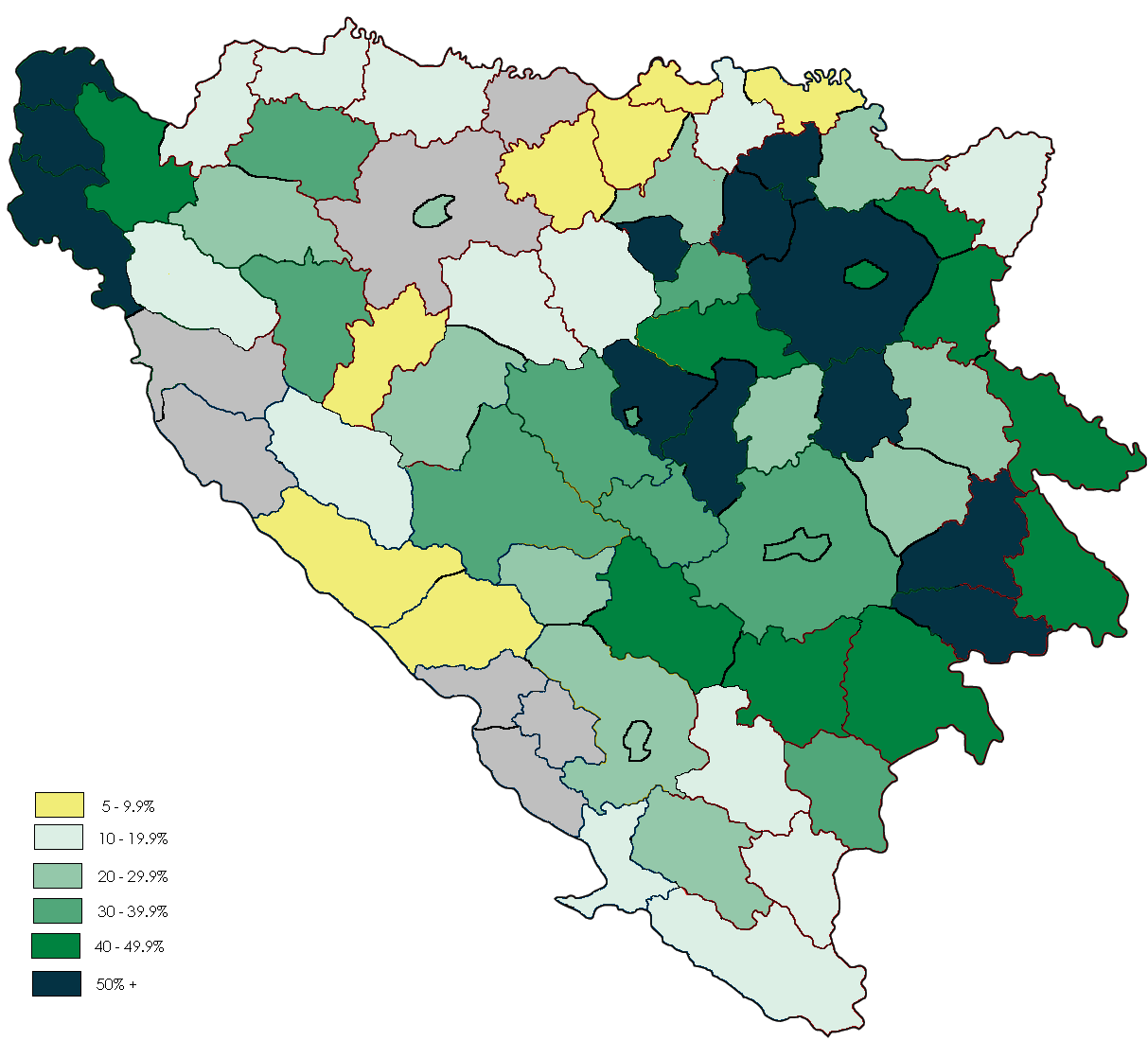
Percentage of Yugoslavs per districts, 1953

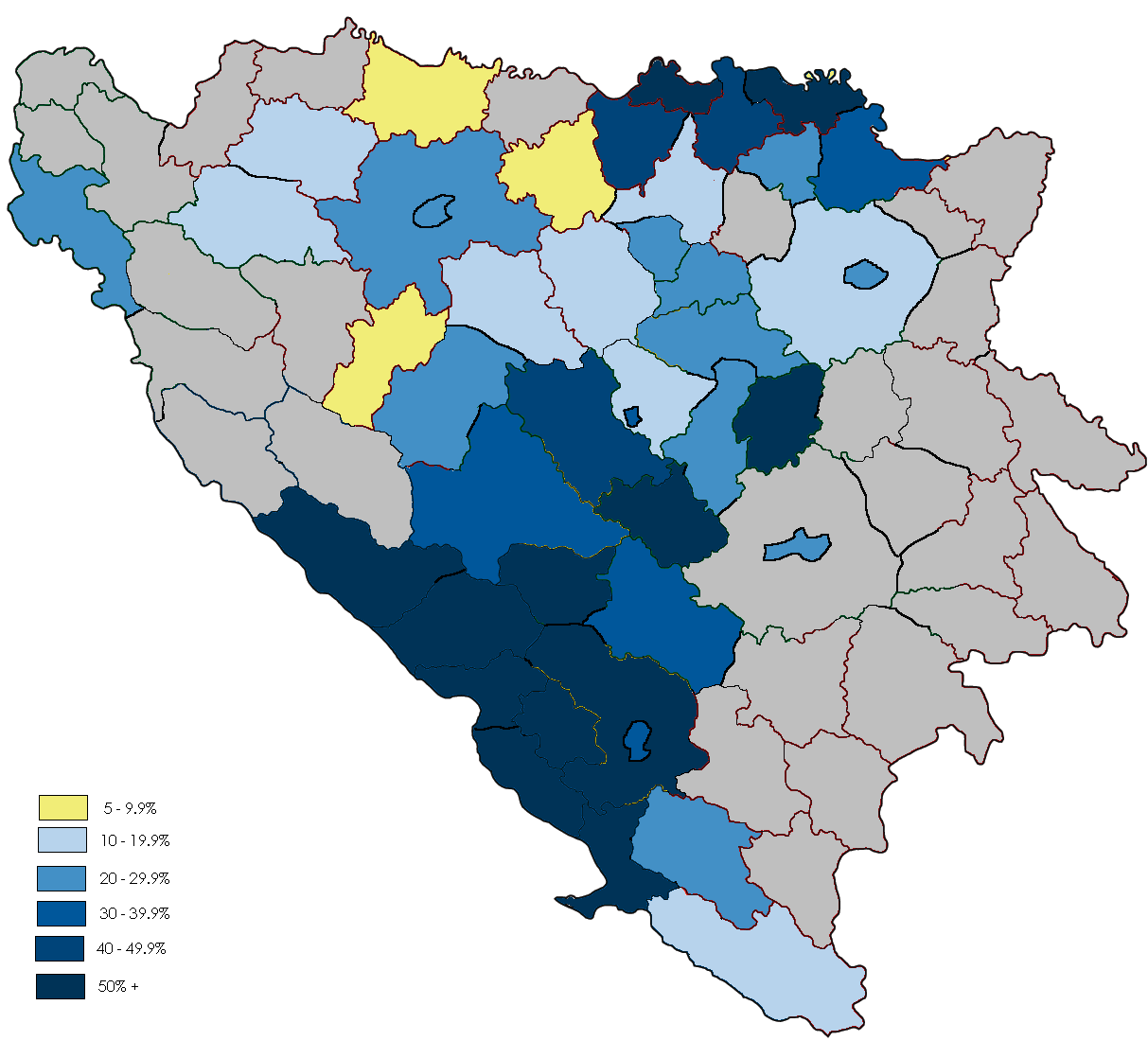
Percentage of Croats per districts, 1953

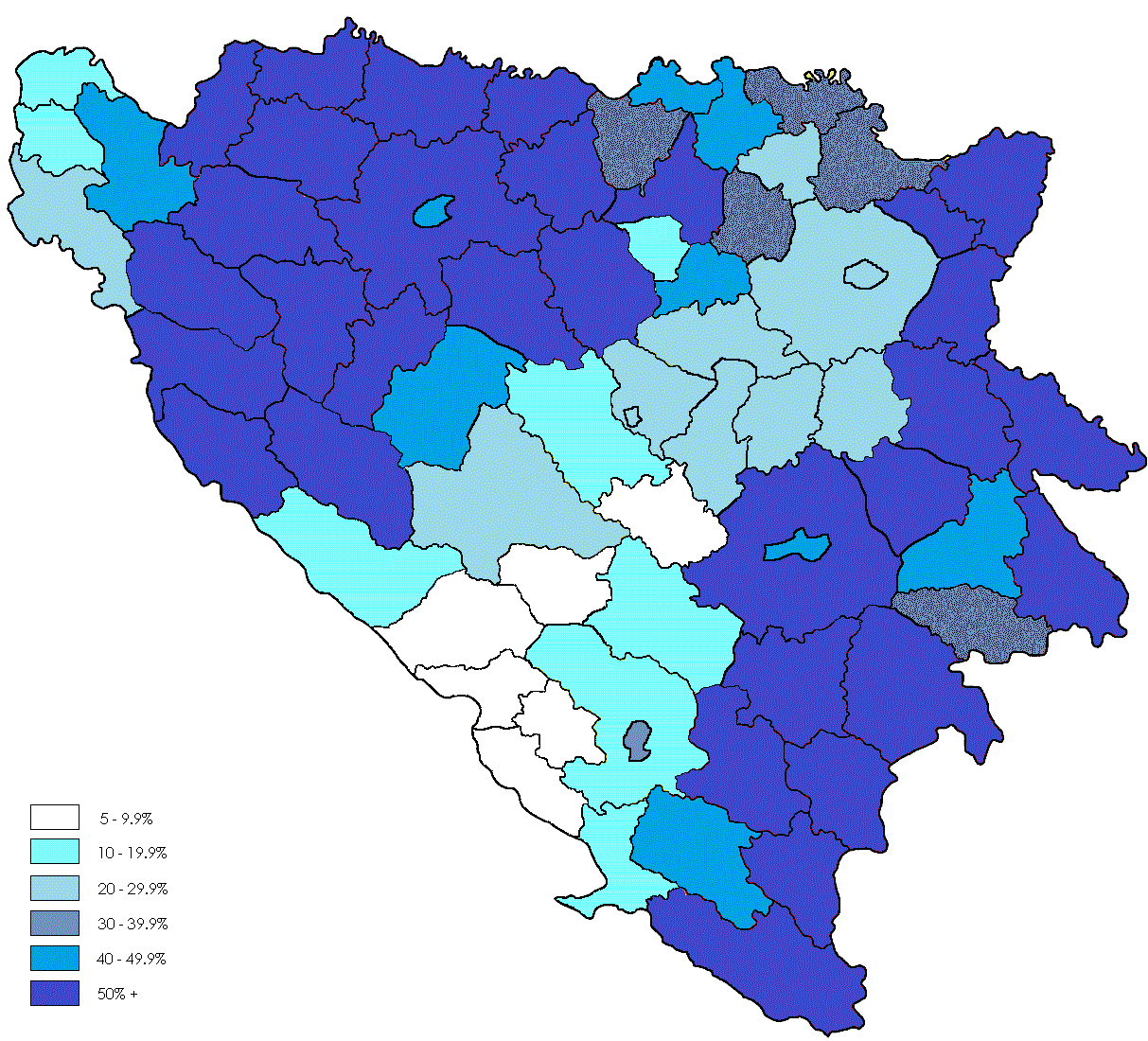
Percentage of Serbs per districts, 1953

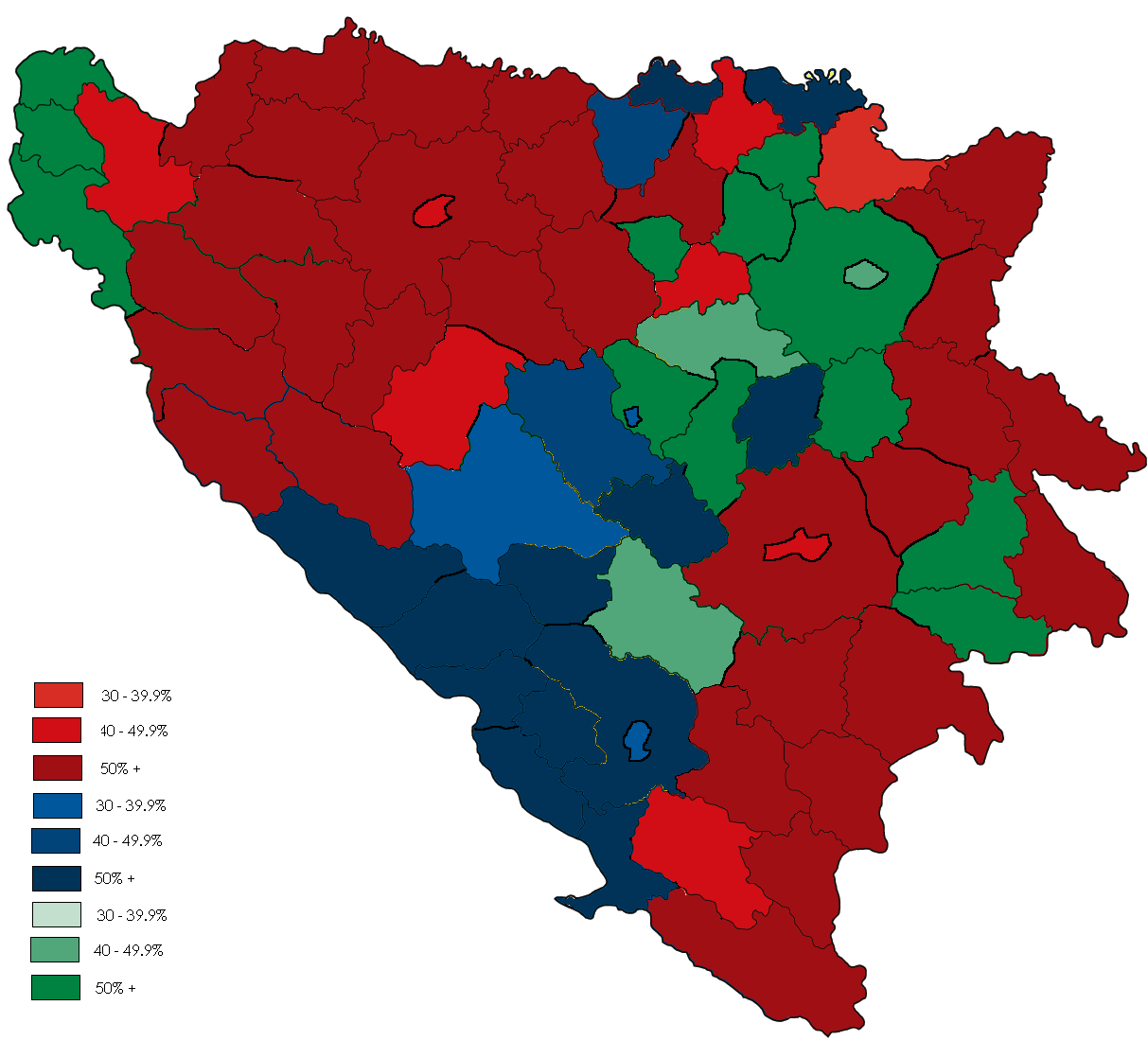
Majority nationality per districts, 1953

== See also ==
- 1991 population census in Bosnia and Herzegovina
