= Bosnia and Herzegovina–Saudi Arabia relations =

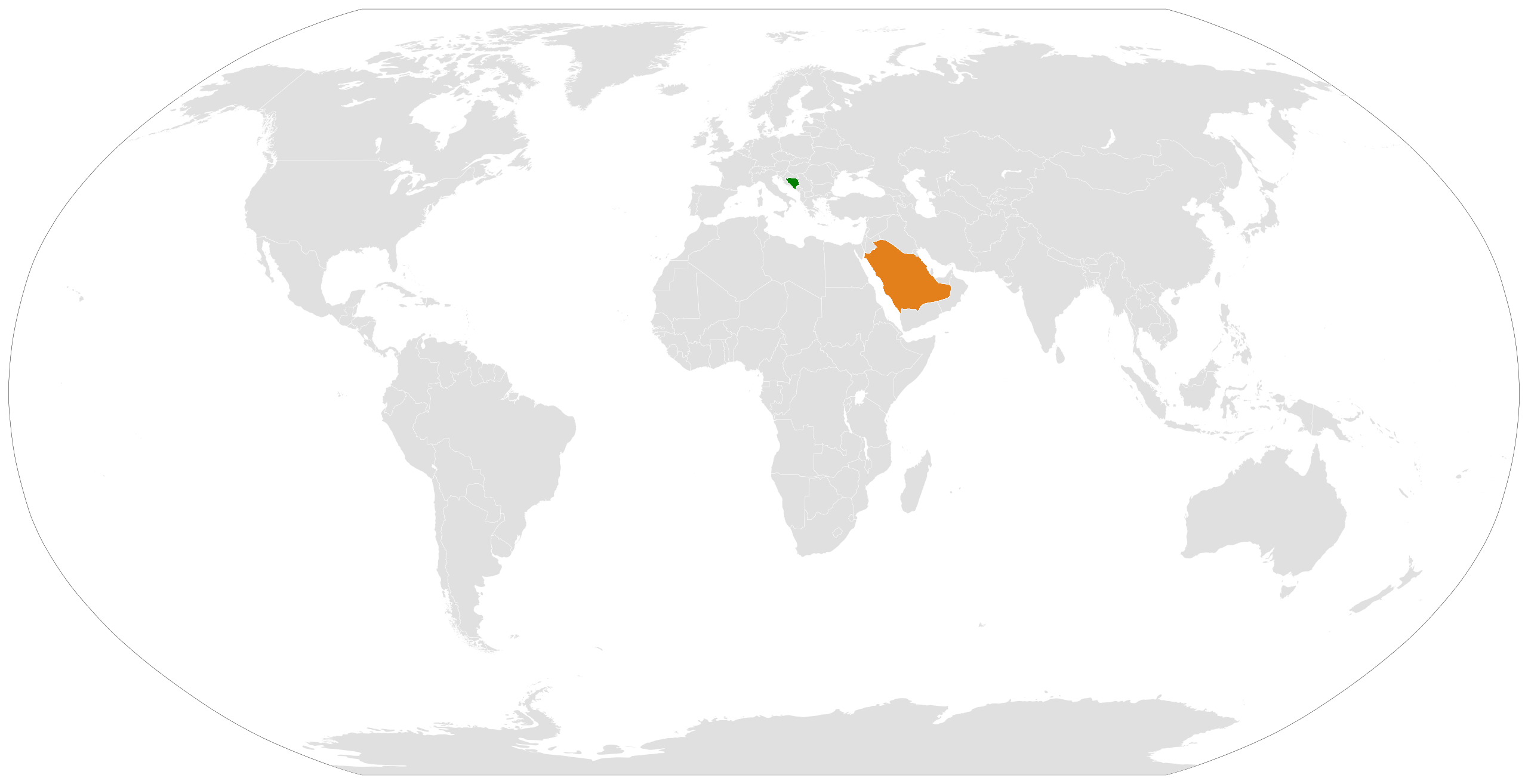

- Bosnia and Herzegovina: Saudi Arabia

Bosnia and Herzegovina maintains an embassy in Riyadh and Saudi Arabia maintains an embassy in Sarajevo. Saudi Arabia has provided enormous financial assistance, cultural and humanitarian support to Bosnia since its independence in 1992. The King Fahd Mosque, the largest mosque in Sarajevo, was funded by the Saudi government and is named after its former king, Fahd of Saudi Arabia.

== Resident diplomatic missions ==
- Bosnia and Herzegovina has an embassy in Riyadh.
- Saudi Arabia has an embassy in Sarajevo.

== See also ==
- Foreign relations of Bosnia and Herzegovina
- Foreign relations of Saudi Arabia
- Yugoslavia and the Non-Aligned Movement
