= Zabrđe =

Zabrđe may refer to:

== Bosnia and Herzegovina ==
- Zabrđe (Ugljevik)
- Zabrđe, Kiseljak
- Zabrđe, Konjic
- Zabrđe, Kotor Varoš
- Zabrđe, Milići, a village in Milići, Republika Srpska

== Croatia ==
- Zabrđe, Croatia

== Montenegro ==
- Zabrđe, Andrijevica
- Zabrđe, Cetinje
- Zabrđe, Pljevlja
- Zabrđe, Plužine, a village near Plužine
- Zabrđe, a village on the Luštica peninsula

== Serbia ==
- Zabrđe (Novi Pazar)
- Zabrđe (Petrovac)
- Zabrđe (Priboj)
- Zabrđe (Sjenica)
