= Alipašino polje =

Planned residential neighbourhood in Sarajevo, Bosnia and Herzegovina

Alipašino Polje Алипашино Поље
- Neighbourhood of Sarajevo
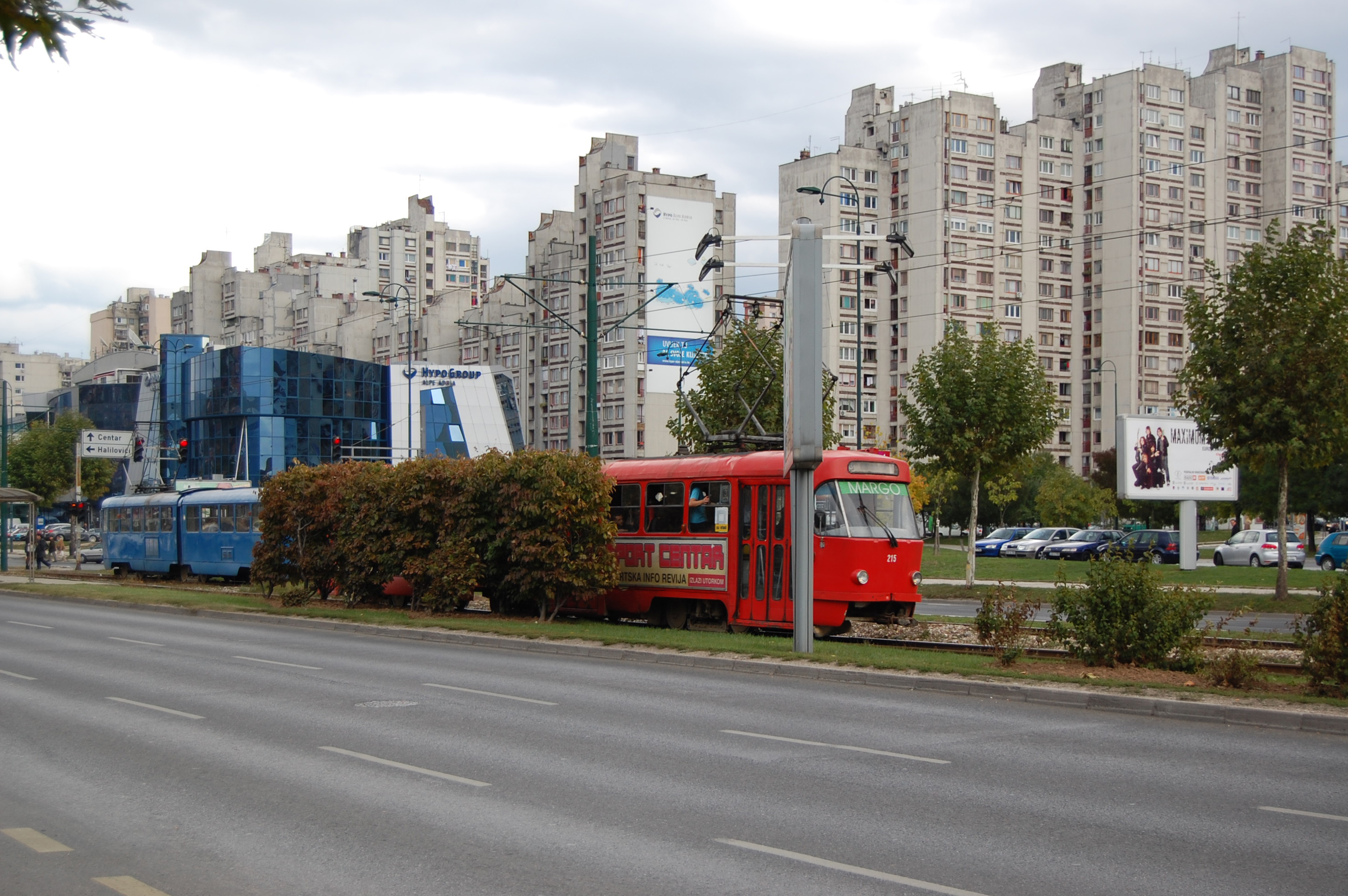
- Tram 215 running westbound past Alipašino Polje on Line 3 (20 October 2011)

- Location within Sarajevo Location within Bosnia and Herzegovina
- Coordinates: 43°50′35″N 18°20′55″E
- Country: Bosnia and Herzegovina
- Entity: Federation of Bosnia and Herzegovina
- Canton: Sarajevo Canton
- Municipality: Novi Grad
- Planned/constructed: 1970s
- Local communities: A-I; A-II; B-I; B-II; C-I; C-II
- See per-MZ figures in text.
- Time zone: UTC+1 (CET)
  - Summer (DST): UTC+2 (CEST)

Alipašino Polje is a large planned residential neighbourhood of western Sarajevo within the municipality of Novi Grad. It is commonly divided into three phases—A, B and C—comprising six local communities (MZ): Alipašino Polje A-I, A-II, B-I, B-II, C-I and C-II. Conceived during the city’s late-socialist westward expansion, the estate combines high-rise towers and mid-rise slab blocks around internal pedestrian courts and local centres along the Ilidža–Baščaršija corridor.

== Geography and urban form ==
Alipašino Polje occupies part of the Sarajevo field (Sarajevsko polje) on the city’s main west–east transport axis (notably Bulevar Meše Selimovića). The composition—19-storey towers stepping down to five-storey blocks—reflects Sarajevo’s late socialist mass-housing practice. The area is covered by a detailed regulatory plan (Regulacioni plan "Alipašino polje").

== History ==
=== Urban planning and construction ===
The neighbourhood was realized in three phases (A, B, C) in the mid-to-late 1970s under Sarajevo’s post-1965 planning framework and westward growth model. Contemporary municipal and architectural sources associate the scheme with architects **Milan Medić**, **Jug Milić** and **Namik Muftić**.

=== Siege of Sarajevo (1992–1995) ===
Located near the front lines around Nedžarići, Alipašino Polje was repeatedly exposed to shelling and sniper fire during the Siege of Sarajevo. Documented incidents include:

- 9 November 1993 – attack on an improvised school (Trg ZAVNOBiH-a). A mortar round struck the then “Prvi maj” primary school (today OŠ "Fatima Gunić"), killing teacher Fatima Gunić and three pupils; more than twenty were wounded. The incident is noted in tribunal records and later reporting.
- 22 January 1994 – children’s sledging massacre (Bosanska ulica, C faza). Mortar shells fired from VRS positions killed six children and wounded others while they were sledging. The event is commemorated annually by the canton and municipality and is covered by domestic and international media.

=== Post-war period ===
In the 2000s, several community landmarks were established or rebuilt, including the King Fahd Cultural Center and Mosque (B faza), the Džemat Alipašino C-faza with the Bosanska džamija (C faza), and the Parish and Church of St. Luke the Evangelist, which serves the local Catholic community. Other notable sites associated with the estate include the Serbian Orthodox cemetery – Alipašino Polje, the House of Radio and Television of Bosnia and Herzegovina (RTV dom, Sivi dom) complex at Bulevar Meše Selimovića 12, the Olympic Hall “Ramiz Salčin” in neighbouring Mojmilo, and the small historic park “Bosanski stećak i zastava” (popularly, Park zastava) opposite the municipal building and the RTV dom.

== Administration and population ==
Administratively, Alipašino Polje comprises six local communities (MZ) aligned with the A/B/C phases.

Population by local community (31 December 2010)
| Local community (MZ) | Phase | Population |
|---|---|---|
| Alipašino Polje A-I | A | 3,371 |
| Alipašino Polje A-II | A | 3,243 |
| Alipašino Polje B-I | B | 4,195 |
| Alipašino Polje B-II | B | 3,819 |
| Alipašino Polje C-I | C | 3,312 |
| Alipašino Polje C-II | C | 3,356 |

Source: Municipal profile (31 December 2010). Street lists and MZ boundaries are published by the municipality.

== Transport ==
Alipašino Polje lies on Sarajevo’s principal west–east public-transport corridor. Services are provided by public operator **KJKP GRAS** (tram, trolleybus, bus) and, on some bus lines, in cooperation with **Centrotrans**.

Tram
• Line 3 Baščaršija – Ilidža (core line along the estate’s corridor).
• Line 5 Baščaršija – Nedžarići (serves the adjacent corridor on the northern edge).

Trolleybus
• 103 Dobrinja – Trg Austrije; • 102 Otoka – Jezero; service patterns intersect the Alipašino corridor at Otoka/Skenderija; timetables and routings are set in the cantonal network plan.

Bus
• 31E Vijećnica (Baščaršija) – Dobrinja express bus links the Old Town with western residential districts; notices and service information are issued by the Ministry and operators.

== Education ==
- JU OŠ “Fatima Gunić” (formerly “Prvi maj”), Nerkeza Smailagića 18.
- JU OŠ “Meša Selimović”, Geteova 16.

== Services and health ==
Primary care is organized through district health centres and satellite ambulantas in each phase; municipal documentation lists locations and catchments for A, B and C phases.

== Religion and community landmarks ==
- King Fahd Cultural Center and Mosque (B faza), a religious–cultural complex with educational and sports facilities.
- Bosanska džamija (C faza), mosque of the Džemat Alipašino C-faza (Medžlis IZ Sarajevo).
- Parish and Church of St. Luke the Evangelist (Roman Catholic), with construction phases completed post-2007.
- Serbian Orthodox cemetery – Alipašino Polje (Pravoslavno groblje Alipašino Polje).
- House of Radio and Television of Bosnia and Herzegovina (RTV dom, commonly “Sivi dom”), Brutalist complex on Bulevar Meše Selimovića 12; the name is used by the nearby public-transport stop.
- Olympic Hall “Ramiz Salčin” (Olimpijska dvorana “Ramiz Salčin”) in neighbouring Mojmilo.
- Park “Bosanski stećak i zastava” (Park zastava).

== Notable architecture ==
The settlement is frequently cited in architectural literature as a mature example of late-socialist mass-housing and modernist urbanism in Sarajevo.

== See also ==
- Siege of Sarajevo
- Novi Grad, Sarajevo
