= Čengić Vila =

Neighbourhood in Sarajevo, Bosnia and Herzegovina

Čengić vila Ченгић вила
- Neighbourhood
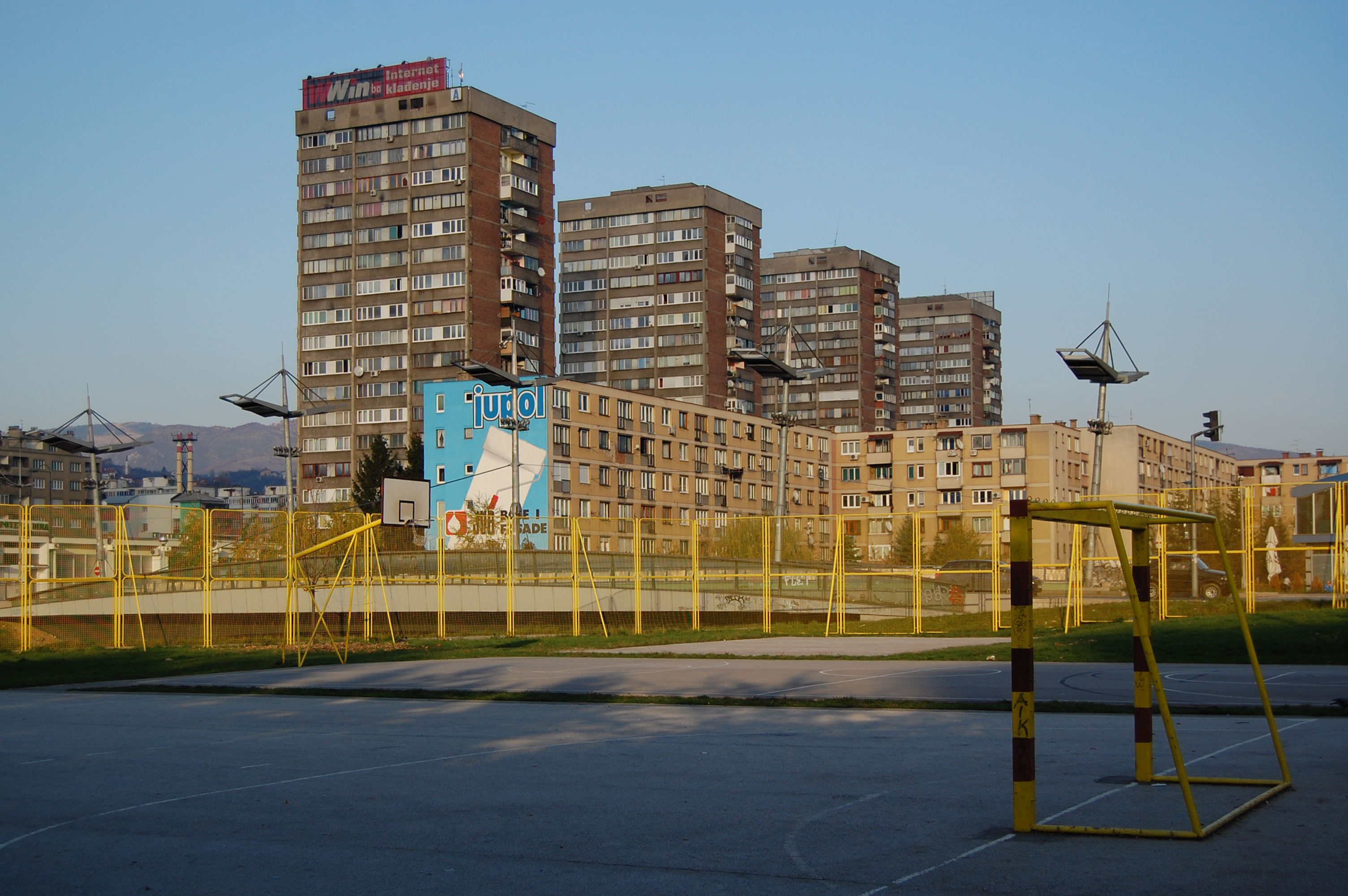
- A hardcourt by the neighbourhood's residential buildings
- Interactive map of Čengić vila
- Coordinates: 43°50′34.71″N 18°20′53.28″E
- Country: Bosnia and Herzegovina
- Entity: Federation of Bosnia and Herzegovina
- Time zone: UTC+1 (CET)
  - Summer (DST): UTC+2 (CEST)

Čengić Vila (Cyrillic: Ченгић Вила) is a neighbourhood in Sarajevo, Bosnia and Herzegovina. The neighborhood is a part of the Novo Sarajevo municipality. It is divided into the Čengić Vila I and Čengić Vila II units. Čengić Vila is home to 9,282 residents.

The neighborhood's name has two elements: Čengić, comes from a family name, while Vila refers to a type of building (villa). Dedaga Čengić, later known as Derviš-paša and the son of Smail Agha Čengić, moved to Sarajevo in 1860. He acquired a summer house recently built by Topal Osman-paša, who governed Bosnia from 1861 to 1869. The area was called "Dedagini Konaci" (Dedaga's Residences) from 1878 to around 1900. It was during this period that the name "Čengić Vila" began to be used, and it has remained in use ever since.

After Austria-Hungary annexed Bosnia and Herzegovina, a military training ground known as the "Exercir" was established in the area of Čengić Villa I. Following the end of World War I, this site was used as an alternative stadium. Today, Čengić Villa I is a highly urbanized complex featuring numerous cultural, sports, and educational facilities.
