= Dolac, Zavidovići =

Dolac
- Village
- Location within Bosnia and Herzegovina
- Coordinates: 44.4800898°N 18.1363901°E
- Country: Bosnia and Herzegovina
- Entity: Federation of Bosnia and Herzegovina
- Canton: Zenica-Doboj
- Municipality: Zavidovići

Area
  - Total: 1.69 sq mi (4.37 km^{2})

Population (2013)
  - Total: 160
  - Density: 95/sq mi (37/km^{2})
- Time zone: UTC+1 (CET)
  - Summer (DST): UTC+2 (CEST)

Dolac is a village in the municipality of Zavidovići, Bosnia and Herzegovina. It is located in a bend of the River Bosna.

== Demographics ==
According to the 2013 census, its population was 160.

Ethnicity in 2013
Ethnicity	Number	Percentage
Serbs	103	64.4%
Bosniaks	42	26.3%
Croats	3	1.9%
other/undeclared	12	7.5%
Total	160	100%
