= Dolac, Berane =

Dolac Долац
- Neighborhood
- Location within Montenegro
- Coordinates: 42°50′29″N 19°51′06″E
- Country: Montenegro
- Municipality: Berane

Population (2023)
  - Total: 1,372
- Time zone: UTC+1 (CET)
  - Summer (DST): UTC+2 (CEST)

Dolac (Serbian Cyrillic: Долац) is a neighborhood in the city of Berane, Montenegro.

== History ==
Early settlement

The area of Dolac has been inhabited since the Middle Ages. Because of its fertile land and proximity to the Lim River, people mainly lived from: • livestock farming • agriculture • fruit growing

The settlement developed as a village within the historical region of Vasojevići, one of the largest tribes in northern Montenegro.

Ottoman period

During the rule of the Ottoman Empire (15th–19th century), the population of Dolac lived within the administrative divisions established by the empire. Villages were usually small and organized around brotherhoods (extended family clans).

The people of this region often participated in: • uprisings against Ottoman rule • battles alongside the Vasojevići tribe

Liberation and joining Montenegro

After the Congress of Berlin in 1878, the Berane region officially became part of the state of Principality of Montenegro. This period marked the beginning of faster development, including the construction of roads and schools.

20th century

In the 20th century Dolac experienced several important historical periods.

World War I (1914–1918) Many villagers participated in battles as part of the Montenegrin army.

World War II (1941–1945) The area of Berane and Dolac was affected by wartime conflicts and the partisan resistance movement.

After the war, during the time of the Socialist Federal Republic of Yugoslavia, the village modernized: • roads were built • electricity and water systems were introduced • schools and infrastructure developed

== Landmarks and important places ==
1. Churches and religious sites

In and around Dolac there are Orthodox churches belonging to the Serbian Orthodox Church. These places are important gathering points for the community, especially during: •village celebrations •religious holidays •church processions

2. Nature and landscape

Dolac is known for its natural surroundings: •hills and forests around the village •meadows and orchards •the nearby Lim River

The area is suitable for: •hiking •nature walks •agriculture

3. Proximity to Berane

Because Dolac is close to the town of Berane, residents often use the town’s institutions and services such as: •schools •the hospital •sports centers •cultural institutions

== Demographics ==
According to the 2023 census, its population was 1,372.

Ethnicity in 2023
Ethnicity	Number	Percentage
Serbs	908	66.56%
Montenegrins	410	30.06%
other/undeclared	27	1.97%
Total	1,372	100%
