= Dolac, Glamoč =

Dolac
- Village
- Location within Bosnia and Herzegovina
- Coordinates: 43°55′16″N 17°00′22″E
- Country: Bosnia and Herzegovina
- Entity: Federation of Bosnia and Herzegovina
- Canton: Canton 10
- Municipality: Glamoč

Area
  - Total: 48.05 km^{2} (18.55 sq mi)

Population (2013)
  - Total: 16
  - Density: 0.33/km^{2} (0.86/sq mi)
- Time zone: UTC+1 (CET)
  - Summer (DST): UTC+2 (CEST)

Dolac is a village in the Municipality of Glamoč in Canton 10 of the Federation of Bosnia and Herzegovina, an entity of Bosnia and Herzegovina.

== Demographics ==
According to the 2013 census, its population was 84.

Ethnicity in 2013
Ethnicity	Number	Percentage
Bosniaks	13	81.3%
Serbs	3	18.8%
Total	16	100%

== Bibliography ==
- Ethnicity/National Affiliation, Religion and Mother Tongue (PDF). Sarajevo: Agency for Statistics of Bosnia and Herzegovina. 2019.
