= Dolac (Novi Pazar) =

Coordinates: 43°12′N 20°30′E

Dolac Долац
- Village (Selo)
- Interactive map of Dolac
- Country: Serbia
- Municipality: Novi Pazar
- Time zone: UTC+1 (CET)
  - Summer (DST): UTC+2 (CEST)

Dolac is a village situated in Novi Pazar municipality in Serbia.
