= Zabrđe (Petrovac) =

Zabrđe Забрђе
- Village
- Location within Serbia
- Coordinates: 44°22′57″N 21°22′07″E
- Country: Serbia
- District: Braničevo District
- Municipality: Petrovac na Mlavi
- Time zone: UTC+1 (CET)
  - Summer (DST): UTC+2 (CEST)

Zabrđe is a village situated in Petrovac na Mlavi municipality in Serbia.
