= Bosmal City Center =

Skyscraper in Sarajevo, Bosnia and Herzegovina

- Bosmalov gradski centar

General information
- Location: Sarajevo, Bosnia and Herzegovina
- Coordinates: 43.8466°N 18.3745°E
- Completed: 2017
- Opening: Cyrillic
- Cost: €120 million

Height
- Roof: 118 m (387 ft)

The Bosmal City Center (BCC) (Bosnian, Croatian and Serbian: Bosmalov gradski centar / Босмалов градски центар) is a business and residential tower located in Sarajevo, Bosnia and Herzegovina. Standing 118 m (387 ft) high, it is the second tallest residential building in the Balkans. In addition to apartment units, the complex houses several amenities, including restaurants, salons, and shops.

The Bosmal City Center was the project of Bosnian firm Bosmal, created in 2001 by brothers Nijaz and Edin Šabanović from Visoko, who left Bosnia and Herzegovina during the war, and emigrated to Malaysia. With an overall investment valued at €120 million, the Bosmal City Center is the largest direct foreign greenfield investment in Bosnia and Herzegovina. The project involved nearly seventy companies and employed more than 3,500 workers.
