= Rečica, Bosnia and Herzegovina =

Rečica Речица
- Village
- Location within Bosnia and Herzegovina
- Coordinates: 43.894°N 18.296°E
- Country: Bosnia and Herzegovina
- Entity: Federation of Bosnia and Herzegovina
- Canton: Sarajevo
- Municipality: Novi Grad Sarajevo

Area
  - Total: 2.21 sq mi (5.73 km^{2})

Population (2013)
  - Total: 332
  - Density: 150/sq mi (57.9/km^{2})
- Time zone: UTC+1 (CET)
  - Summer (DST): UTC+2 (CEST)

Rečica is a village in the municipality of Novi Grad, Bosnia and Herzegovina.

== Demographics ==
According to the 2013 census, its population was 332.

Ethnicity in 2013
Ethnicity	Number	Percentage
Bosniaks	290	87.3%
Serbs	19	5.7%
Croats	6	1.8%
other/undeclared	17	5.1%
Total	332	100%
