= Bojnik, Sarajevo =

Bojnik Бојник
- Village
- Interactive map of Bojnik
- Location within Bosnia and Herzegovina
- Coordinates: 43°52′N 18°16′E
- Country: Bosnia and Herzegovina
- Entity: Federation of Bosnia and Herzegovina
- Canton: Sarajevo
- Municipality: Novi Grad Sarajevo

Area
  - Total: 1.22 sq mi (3.16 km^{2})

Population (2013)
  - Total: 399
  - Density: 327/sq mi (126/km^{2})
- Time zone: UTC+1 (CET)
  - Summer (DST): UTC+2 (CEST)

Bojnik is a village in the municipality of Novi Grad, Sarajevo, Bosnia and Herzegovina. According to the 2013 census, the village has a population of 399.

== Demographics ==
According to the 2013 census, its population was 399.

Ethnicity in 2013
Ethnicity	Number	Percentage
Bosniaks	386	96.7%
Croats	2	0.5%
Serbs	1	0.3%
other/undeclared	10	2.5%
Total	399	100%
