= Vilsonovo Šetalište =

Street in Sarajevo

- Wilson's Lane / Wilson's Promenade
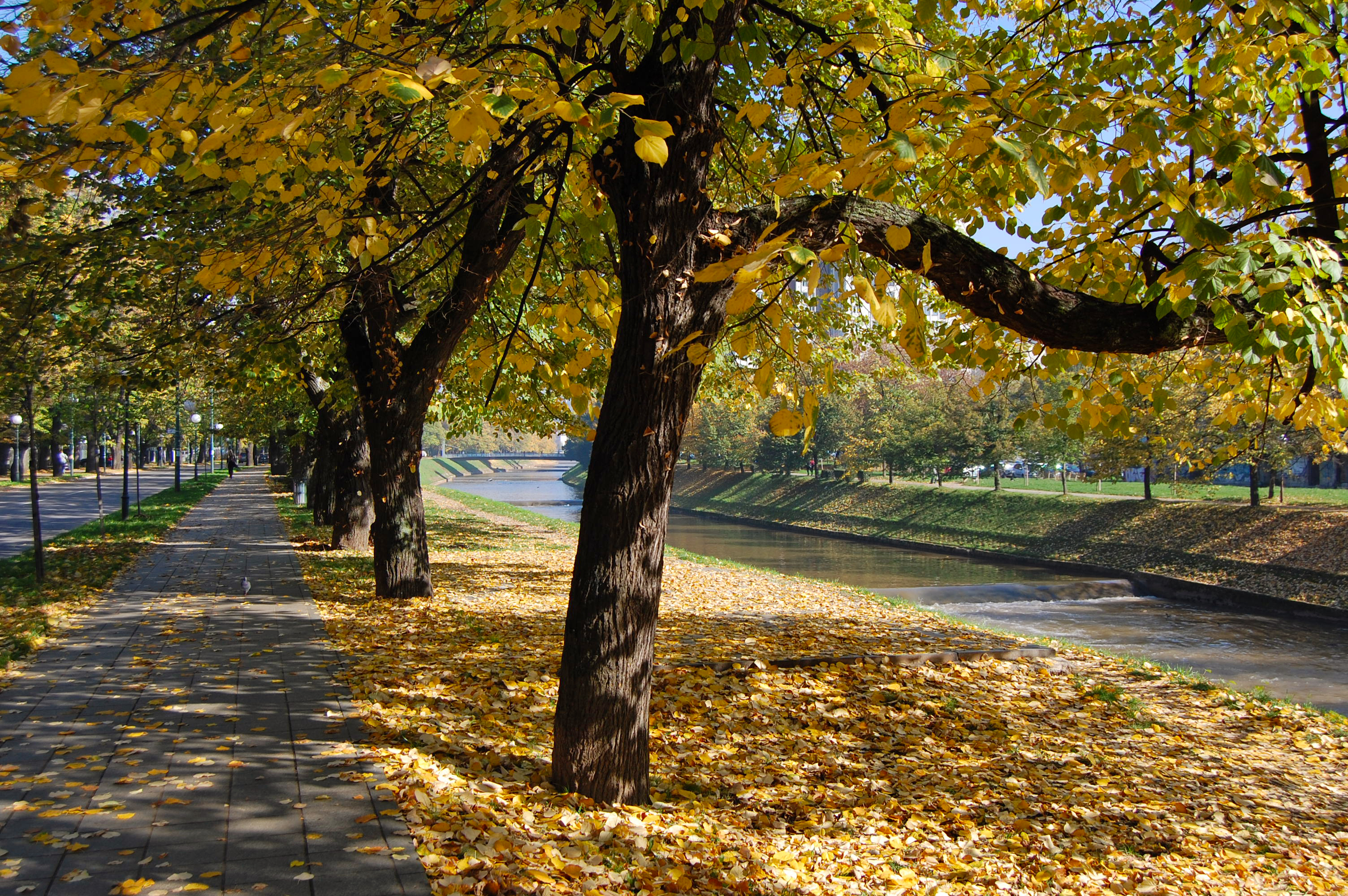
- Vilsonovo Šetalište in 2013

- Location within Bosnia and Herzegovina
- Namesake: Woodrow Wilson
- Addresses: Vilsonovo Šetalište
- Location: Sarajevo, Bosnia and Herzegovina
- Coordinates: 43.853609°N 18.403237°E

Construction
- Construction start: 1878

Other
- Known for: 480 Linden and chestnut trees; named after the former president of the United States, Woodrow Wilson
- Status: promenade

Vilsonovo Šetalište (transl. Wilson's Promenade / Wilson's Lane) is a promenade in Sarajevo, Bosnia and Herzegovina. It is an important street for the city, however, in the afternoon hours and during weekends the traffic restriction is in force, and the promenade becomes a recreational area. The lane also bears a historical significance. It was conceived during the Austro-Hungarian era.

Wilson's Promenade was named after the former president of the United States, Woodrow Wilson. There are 480 linden and chestnut trees. An important feature is the Miljacka river, which runs along the promenade. The lane is frequently visited not just by people living to its close proximity, but also by people from all over the city as well as tourists.
