= Vrbanja massacre =

- Part of the Croat–Muslim War
- Location: Vrbanja, Bugojno
- Date: 17–28 July 1993
- Target: Bosniaks
- Attack type: Mass killing
- Deaths: 45
- Perpetrator: Croatian Defence Council (HVO)

The massacre in Vrbanja is the name for a war crime committed by the Croatian Defence Council (HVO) against Bosniak civilians in the village of Vrbanja from July 17 to 28, 1993, during the Croat-Muslim War.

== Crime ==
Croatian Defence Council (HVO) members killed 45 Bosnian Muslim civilians aged 19 to 82 in Vrbanja, and crimes against Bosnian Muslims were also committed in the settlements of Vrpeč, Crniče, Donjići and Čaušlije.

On July 17, 1993, a Croatian civilian was killed while driving through Vrbanja in civilian clothes, shorts and without any weapons. Vrbanja was an ethnically mixed settlement located on the M 16-2 road at the exit from Bugojno towards Uskoplje. That road was still the only communication by which the HVO was spatially connected with Ante Starčević's Uskopal brigade and further to the south. All other directions were controlled by either the Serbs or the Army of the Republic of Bosnia and Herzegovina (ARBiH). HVO units also had a camp in the premises of the Akvarijum motel where another 46 people were forcibly imprisoned. Detained Bosnian Muslims, children, women and the elderly, were victims of various forms of abuse. Slavko Šakić was sentenced to 8.5 years in prison in 2008 for this crime.
