= Rovna =

Rovna or Rovná may refer to places:

== Czech Republic ==
- Rovná (Pelhřimov District), a municipality and village in the Vysočina Region
- Rovná (Sokolov District), a municipality and village in the Karlovy Vary Region
- Rovná (Strakonice District), a municipality and village in the South Bohemian Region
- Rovná, a village and part of Petrovice u Sušice in the Plzeň Region
- Rovná, a village and part of Strážov (Klatovy District) in the Plzeň Region
- Rovná, a village and part of Zajíčkov in the Vysočina Region

== Bosnia and Herzegovina ==
- Rovna, Bosnia and Herzegovina, a village
