= Battle of Bugojno =

1993 battle of the Bosnian War

- Part of the Croat–Bosniak War
Date	18–29 July 1993
Location	Bugojno, Bosnia and Herzegovina 44°03′N 17°27′E
Result	ARBiH victory
Territorial changes	ARBiH captured the municipality of Bugojno

Belligerents
Republic of Bosnia and Herzegovina	Croatian Community of Herzeg-Bosnia

Commanders and leaders
Selmo Cikotić; Senad Dautović; Tahir Granić	Ivica Lučić

Units involved
Army of the Republic of Bosnia and Herzegovina; 3rd Corps; 307th Mountain Brigade	Croatian Defence Council; Operative Zone Northwest Herzegovina; Eugen Kvaternik Brigade; Special Purpose Unit "Garavi"

Strength
1,500 soldiers	1,500–2,000 soldiers

Casualties and losses
92 soldiers killed 211 soldiers wounded	107 soldiers killed 130 soldiers wounded 470 soldiers captured
- 15,000 Bosnian Croat civilians displaced

The Battle of Bugojno (Bosnian and Croatian: Bitka za Bugojno) was fought between forces of the Army of the Republic of Bosnia and Herzegovina (ARBiH) and the Croatian Defence Council (HVO) for control of the town and municipality of Bugojno in central Bosnia, from 18–28 July 1993. The area of Bugojno was under joint control of the ARBiH 307th Brigade and the HVO Eugen Kvaternik Brigade since the start of the Bosnian War. Violent incidents in Bugojno followed the escalation of the Croat-Bosniak War in adjacent municipalities throughout the 1st half of 1993. Bugojno was spared from fighting and the two local brigades were still formally allied by June 1993, at the time of an ARBiH offensive in central Bosnia.

Fighting broke out in the town on 18 July. The HVO forces, outnumbered by three to one, were separated and surrounded in several locations. Most of them were defeated within a week of intense street combat. The last HVO units in the town surrendered on 25 July, while combat in the rest of the municipality lasted for another four days. The ARBiH won control over the entire municipality. Its casualties were 92 killed and 211 wounded, while the HVO had 107 killed, 130 wounded and 470 captured. The Eugen Kvaternik Brigade was effectively destroyed in the battle. An estimated 15,000 Croats fled. Several hundred HVO POWs and civilians were detained in various prison camps in the town, including the Iskra Stadium. The last prisoners were released in March 1994.

The Court of Bosnia and Herzegovina convicted four ARBiH officials and one HVO official for war crimes committed during and after the battle. The Court charged the ARBiH authorities in Bugojno for participating in a joint criminal enterprise against Croat detainees, a qualification that was dropped on appeal.

== Background ==
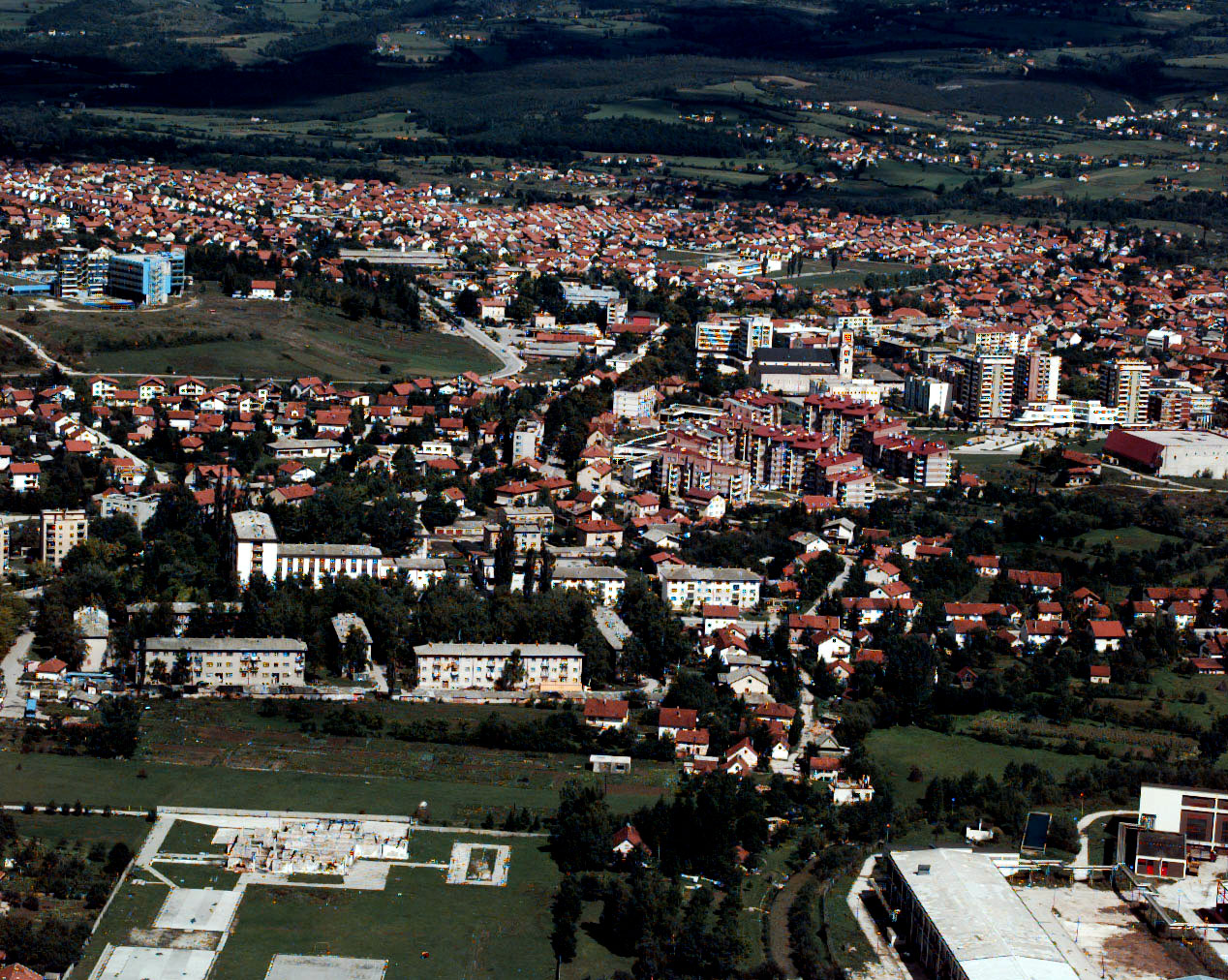
The town of Bugojno in 1996

At the beginning of the Bosnian War, the area of Bugojno, a town and municipality in central Bosnia situated on the river Vrbas, was under joint control of the Croatian Defence Council (HVO), the main Croat army, and the Army of the Republic of Bosnia and Herzegovina (ARBiH), the main Bosniak army. The two armies cooperated against the Army of Republika Srpska (VRS). Bugojno was at the crossroads of two important routes linking the central part of the country with the region of Herzegovina and leading further to Croatia. A weapons factory in the town produced mines and hand grenades.

Before the war, the municipality of Bugojno had a population of 46,889, of which 42% were Bosniaks (Bosnian Muslims), 34% were Croats, and 18% were Serbs. The town of Bugojno had 22,641 citizens, with the percentage of Bosniaks, Croats and Serbs each being 30%. In the 1990 municipal election, the municipality elected 21 delegates of the Croatian Democratic Union of Bosnia and Herzegovina (HDZ BiH), 20 delegates of the Party of Democratic Action (SDA), and 9 delegates of the Serb Democratic Party (SDS). The elected mayor was a Croat from the HDZ BiH. The ethnic balance in the municipality changed significantly in 1992. Most Serbs fled at the start of the Bosnian War, while a large number of Bosniak and Croat refugees moved in from other parts of the country.

The HVO and the Bosnian Territorial Defence Force, later transformed into the ARBiH, established a defence system in Bugojno early in the war. Bugojno was within the area of responsibility of the Yugoslav People's Army's (JNA) 19th Partisan Brigade of the 30th Partisan Division. Several assaults by the JNA, which later became the VRS, were repelled by the HVO and the ARBiH throughout 1992. The VRS held the adjacent municipalities of Donji Vakuf and Kupres, which was captured by the JNA in April.

In October 1992, a series of incidents led to open fighting between the HVO and the ARBiH in Novi Travnik, east of Bugojno. The local HVO in Bugojno reached an agreement with the local ARBiH not to send their forces outside of the municipality. The road towards Novi Travnik was blocked. On 26 October, a ceasefire was signed in Bugojno between HVO and ARBiH representatives. The clashes in October are generally regarded as the start of the Croat-Bosniak War.

Despite the outbreak of hostilities, the conflict remained localized and a general military alliance was still in effect. Relations between Croats and Bosniaks in Bugojno were relatively good until January 1993, when the HVO and the ARBiH clashed in Gornji Vakuf, southeast of Bugojno. Local commanders tried to preserve the alliance by allowing the free movement of each other's troops, but relations continued to deteriorate.

== Opposing forces ==
Bugojno was within the area of responsibility of the HVO Operative Zone Northwest Herzegovina. The HVO Eugen Kvaternik Brigade, established in May 1992, was based in Bugojno and was organized into three battalions, a military police company, and a small mixed artillery battery. It was under the command of Ivica Lučić and had an estimated strength of 1,000 to 1,500 soldiers. Prior to the conflict with the ARBiH, the brigade included around 200 Bosniaks in its ranks.

The ARBiH assigned the municipality of Bugojno to the 3rd Corps. In March 1993, 3rd Corps Commander Enver Hadžihasanović reorganized its brigades into four Operational Groups (OG), including the OG West with headquarters in Bugojno. The OG West was commanded by Selmo Cikotić. Its 307th Mountain Brigade, organized into 4 battalions, was based in Bugojno, under the command of Tahir Granić. Fully mobilized, the brigade could field around 3-3,500 troops with several dozen mortars. Senad Dautović was the head of the Unified Command of the ARBiH Bugojno.

== Prelude ==
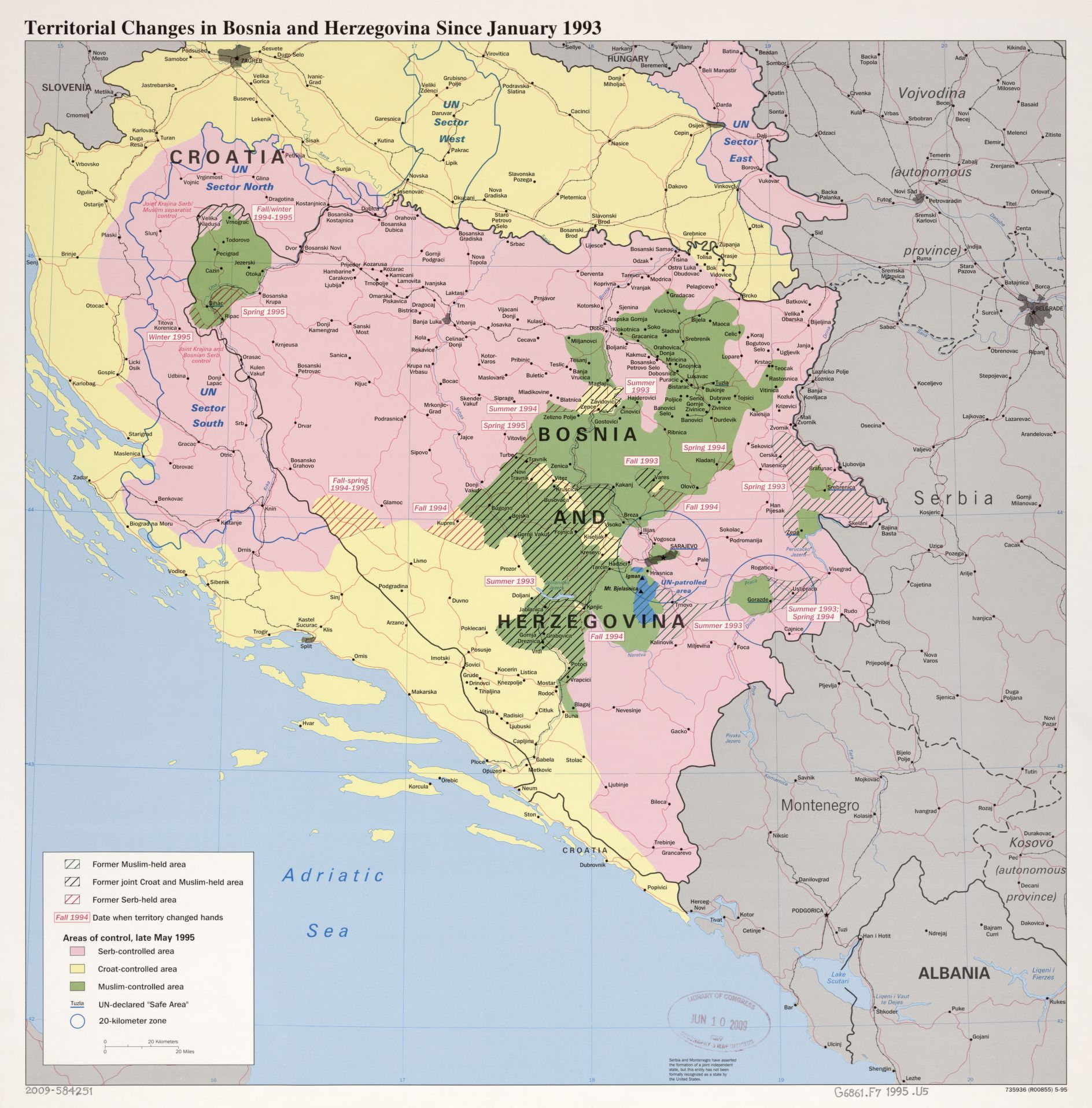
Territorial changes in Bosnia and Herzegovina since January 1993, also showing the area of Bugojno

The Croat-Bosniak War was raging in central Bosnia in April and in Herzegovina in May 1993. In June 1993, the ARBiH started an offensive against the HVO in central Bosnia, defeating the HVO in Travnik and most of the Novi Travnik municipality, northeast of Bugojno. The 307th Bugojno Mountain Brigade assisted other ARBiH units in the fighting in Novi Travnik.

The ARBiH's objective was to secure the road that connected the VRS-held Jajce and Donji Vakuf, the contested Bugojno and Gornji Vakuf, HVO-held Prozor, ARBiH-held Jablanica, and continued south to Mostar. Control of the Slavko Rodić weapons factory in Bugojno, damaged earlier in the war but still functional, was also of strategic importance.

By June 1993, the ARBiH and the HVO still jointly controlled the checkpoints in and around Bugojno. The units split in July. By that time, a number of violent incidents by extremists on both sides increased ethnic tensions. The ethnic unrest culminated in two events: the torching of the Bosniak village of Vrbanja, resulting in many casualties, and the killing of two Croat policemen who were members of the joint patrol.

== Battle ==
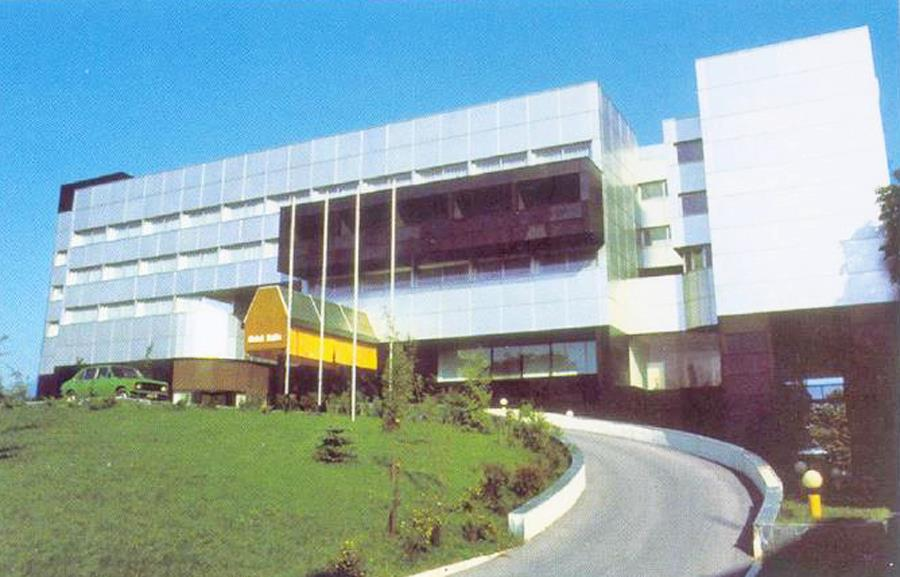
The Kalin Hotel in Bugojno, the last large HVO pocket of resistance

The battle began on the morning of 18 July with an ARBiH 307th Brigade attack on the HVO Eugen Kvaternik Brigade. Since a large number of HVO soldiers were on leave of deployed outside of Bugojno, the actual fighting strength of the HVO was estimated at no more than 200-400 in the town. After several days of fierce street fighting, the ARBiH put under control most of the key facilities in the town, including the HVO Eugen Kvaternik Brigade's barracks. The HVO forces were separated into three locations. The HVO's 3rd battalion was surrounded in the town's elementary school. It surrendered on 23 July, followed by the 1st and 2nd battalion. The HVO military police company, surrounded in the Kalin hotel, was the last large pocket of resistance until it surrendered on 25 July. The fighting continued southeast of the town and lasted until 29 July.

== Aftermath ==
The ARBiH casualties were 92 killed and 211 wounded. The HVO had 107 killed and 130 wounded. According to a September 1993 report by OG West, 470 "HVO members" were captured in the course of the fighting. The report noted that 383 had the status of prisoners of war, while 66 were released. The other 87 prisoners, who were not listed as prisoners of war, were considered irregular combatants by the ARBiH. Around 15,000 Croats fled from the municipality.

The remnants of the Eugen Kvaternik Brigade were regrouped into a single battalion and later combined with the HVO Kupres and Jajce brigades into the 55th Home Guard Regiment. From July 1993, the HVO's Operative Zone Central Bosnia was completely cut off from the HVO in Herzegovina and could not receive any significant amounts of military supplies.

After the capture of Bugojno, the ARBiH continued its offensive towards Gornji Vakuf on 1 August, around 20 kilometers to the southeast, and captured most of the HVO-held part of the municipality. The HVO made a counterattack with limited success. The confrontation line soon stabilized, running through the town of Gornji Vakuf.

=== War crimes and prosecution ===
In 1993 and 1994, the Wartime Presidency of Bugojno, of the Republic of Bosnia and Herzegovina, established a prison camp for captured enemy combatants, at the football stadium "Luke", where 294 HVO war-prisoners were held for eight months, and mentally and physically abused. Thousands of Croat civilians were also expelled from Bugojno in 1993 and 1994 by the Army of the Republic of Bosnia and Herzegovina.

Bosniak civilians from the settlement of Vrbanja and other parts of the municipality were detained in the "Akvarijum" motel in Bugojno during the battle in July 1993. The arrests were conducted by the HVO's Special Purpose Unit Garavi. The prisoners were abused and beaten, while one prisoner was killed. Several hundred HVO soldiers and Croat civilians, captured during the battle, were detained by the ARBiH in various detention facilities in Bugojno, where they were subjected to physical abuse. The longest open detention facility was the Iskra Stadium, which was turned into a detention camp in August 1993. Around 300 Croat prisoners were detained there for eight months. They were taken to perform forced labor and used as human shields. The camp operated until 19 March 1994, when it numbered 292 detainees. At least 24 prisoners of the detention facilities in Bugojno were killed.

Croatian sources state that up to 200 Croats were killed by Bosniak forces in war crimes during and after the Battle of Bugojno, of which between 70 and 85 people were civilian victims.

After the war, the SFOR estimated in 1997 that the ethnic composition of the municipality was 38,000 (94%) Bosniaks, 2,000 (5%) Croats and 400 (1%) Serbs.

The Court of Bosnia and Herzegovina and the International Criminal Tribunal for the former Yugoslavia (ICTY) filed several indictments on war crime charges committed during and after the battle. In the trial against Amir Kubura and Enver Hadžihasanović, former Commander of the ARBiH 3rd Corps, the ICTY convicted Hadžihasanović in the first instance verdict in March 2006, inter alia, for failing to take adequate measures to prevent crimes against the detainees in Bugojno. The Appeals Chamber reversed some of the Trial Chamber's findings, including counts related to Bugojno, and reduced his sentence to three and a half years in April 2008.

Slavko Šakić, member of the Special Purpose Unit Garavi of the HVO, pleaded guilty to plunder, torture of Bosniak prisoners and the killing of one prisoner. He was convicted in September 2008 to 8 years and 6 months of imprisonment by the Court of Bosnia and Herzegovina.

Enes Handžić, Assistant Commander for Security of the ARBiH 307th Brigade, was sentenced to eight years in prison by the Court of Bosnia and Herzegovina in May 2011, after he had pleaded guilty to forcing detainees to perform labor and for not taking necessary measures to prevent crimes against the detainees.

The trial in the "Bugojno Three" case, concerning Nisvet Gasal, Musajb Kukavica and Senad Dautović, began in February 2008, and was retried in 2013. In November 2011, in the first instance verdict, the Court of Bosnia and Herzegovina convicted Senad Dautović, head of the ARBiH Bugojno, to 13 years in prison, and Nisvet Gasal, warden of the Iskra Stadium camp, to 6 years. The Court ruled that Senad Dautović participated in a joint criminal enterprise against detainees of Croat ethnicity. According to the verdict, the joint criminal enterprise involved the Bugojno Municipality Wartime Presidency, with Dževad Mlaćo as the Chairman, the Bugojno Defence Staff, the 307th Brigade of the ARBiH, and Operations Group West of the ARBiH. The trial verdict was revoked in December 2012 and a re-trial before the Appellate Division was ordered. In December 2013, the Appellate Division of the Court of BiH reduced Dautović's sentence to seven years and Nisvet Gasal's to four years, while Musajb Kukavic, Security Commander at the Iskra Stadium, was sentenced to four years. In 2015 Dautović was sentenced to 7 years in prison for war crimes against the wounded and war prisoners in Bugojno. Gasal and Kukavica were sentenced to 4 years in prison. Additionally Alija Osmić was sentenced to 3 years in prison.

== See also ==
- Battle of Travnik (1993)
