= Mračaj =

Mračaj, which translates as Darkness from Serbo-Croatian, may refer to:

- Mračaj, Bosansko Grahovo, a village in Bosnia and Herzegovina
- Mračaj (Bugojno), a village in Bosnia and Herzegovina
- Mračaj (Gornji Vakuf), a village in Bosnia and Herzegovina
- Mračaj, Žepče, a village in Bosnia and Herzegovina
