= Vučipolje =

Vučipolje (Cyrillic: Вучипоље) can refer to the following places:

== Bosnia and Herzegovina ==
- Vučipolje (Bugojno), a village near Bugojno
- Vučipolje (Posušje), a village near Posušje

== Croatia ==
- Vučipolje, Zadar County, a village near Gračac
- Vučipolje, Split-Dalmatia County, a village near Hrvace

== Notes ==
1. In English, Vučipolje roughly translates to Wolf Field.
