= Pavis =

Pavis may refer to:

- Pavise, a mediaeval shield
- Pavis: Threshold to Danger, a tabletop role-playing game
- Patrice Pavis (born 1947), British academic
- Yvonne Pavis (1890–?), English actress and writer

== See also ==
- Pavis Wood, an area in England
- Hyundai Pavise, a truck model
- Pavice, a village in Bosnia and Herzegovina
