= Humac =

Humac may refer to:

== In Bosnia and Herzegovina ==
- Humac, Bugojno, a village in Bosnia and Herzegovina
- Humac, Gornji Vakuf-Uskoplje, a village in Bosnia and Herzegovina
- Humac, Ljubuški, a village in Bosnia and Herzegovina

== In Croatia ==
- Donji Humac, a village on the island of Brač in Croatia
- Gornji Humac, a village on the island of Brač in Croatia
- Humac, Hvar, a hamlet on the island of Hvar in Croatia
