= Jazvenik =

Jazvenik may refer to:

- Jazvenik, Bosnia and Herzegovina, a hamlet near Bugojno
- Jazvenik, Croatia, a village near Sisak
