= Dževad Sulejmanpašić =

Bosnian scholar (1893–1976)

- Born: 1893; Vesela, Austro-Hungary
- Died: 1976 (aged 82–83); Mali Lošinj, Yugoslavia
- Resting place: Mali Lošinj
- Occupations: philosopher, educator
- Writing career
- Notable work: Žurnalizam razarač čovječanstva i novinstvo sa najmanjom mjerom žurnalizma (1936)

Dževad Sulejmanpašić (1893–1976) was a Bosnian philosopher and educator. He is the founder of the science of journalism and theory of journalism, method of content analysis, ethics of journalism, media law, responsible advertising and media philosophy in the Southeast Europe.

== Biography ==
He was born in 1893 in Vesela near Bugojno. He is a descendant of a prominent landowning family. The oldest ancestor of Sulejmanpašić is Ali Pasha Skopljak, who was the sanjak-bey of Herzegovina. The Sulejmanpašić family retained its estates and maintained its status as a wealthy beggar family until the end of World War I, when it became a victim of the agrarian reform.

Sulejmanpašić graduated from elementary school and high school in Sarajevo. At the beginning of the World War I, he was mobilized in the army of the Austro-Hungary. After being wounded on the Italian front, he was returned to Sarajevo, where he waited for the end of the war.

After the war, he studied in Vienna. There he meets Karl Kraus. The connection with Immanuel Kant's philosophy originates from the Viennese period, which is the basis of his critical preoccupation with the topics and the state of Bosnian Muslims after the withdrawal of the Ottomans from the Balkans. Due to the deteriorating financial situation of his family, caused by the agrarian reform, Sulejmanpašić leaves his studies in Vienna and returns to Sarajevo. There he got a job in the clerical structure of the Austro-Hungarian administration. He lived in Sarajevo until 1930 when he moved to Zagreb. According to some sources, after World War II he worked as a speech therapist at the Higher Pedagogical School in Zagreb, the predecessor of today's Faculty of Teacher Education. He spoke Bosnian, English, German and French languages.

He died in 1976 in Mali Lošinj.

== Works ==
- Jedan prilog riješenju našeg muslimanskog ženskog pitanja (Sarajevo, 1918)
- Zelen čovjek : komedija u jednom činu iz muslimanskog seoskog života (Sarajevo, 1932)
- Slobodna misao i hikmetovština : dva gledanja na naše muslimanske verske i socijalne probleme (Zagreb, 1933)
- Žurnalizam razarač čovječanstva i novinstvo sa najmanjom mjerom žurnalizma (Zagreb, 1936)
- Mucanje (Zagreb, 1951)
- Problematika nauke o mucanju (Beograd, 1969)
