= Zlokuće =

Zlokuće may refer to:

- Zlokuće (Bugojno), village in the municipality of Bugojno, Bosnia and Herzegovina
- Zlokuće (Kakanj), village in the municipality of Kakanj, Bosnia and Herzegovina
