= Seferovići =

Seferovići may refer to:

- Seferovići (Bugojno), a village in Bosnia and Herzegovina
- Seferovići (Gornji Vakuf), a village in Bosnia and Herzegovina
