= Medini =

Medini may refer to:

- Medini (Bugojno), an abandoned village in the municipality of Bugojno, Bosnia and Herzegovina
- Medini Iskandar Malaysia, a suburb in Iskandar Puteri, Johor Bahru District, Johor, Malaysia
- Gaetano Medini, an Italian-born German chef
- P. K. Medini, a revolutionary singer, musician, stage artist
- Chaim Hezekiah Medini, a rabbinical scholar during the nineteenth century
