= Jagodići =

Jagodići may refer to:

- Jagodići (Bugojno), a village in Bosnia and Herzegovina
- Jagodići (Goražde), a village in Bosnia and Herzegovina
