= Dževad =

Dževad is a masculine given name of Bosnian origin. Notable people with the name include:

== Given name ==
- Dževad Alihodžić (born 1969), Bosnian basketball player
- Dževad Galijašević (born 1962), Bosnian political analyst and counterterrorism expert
- Dževad Hamzić (born 1968), Bosnian volleyball player
- Dževad Karahasan (1953–2023), Bosnian writer, essayist, and philosopher
- Dževad Poturak (born 1977), Bosnian kickboxer and martial artist
- Dževad Prekazi (1957–2026), Kosovar footballer
- Dževad Šećerbegović (born 1955), Bosnian footballer
- Dževad Sulejmanpašić (1893–1976), Bosnian philosopher and educator
- Dževad Turković (born 1972), Bosnian footballer
