= Čavić =

- Language: Serbian

Čavić is a surname. Notable people with the surname include:

- Dragan Čavić (born 1958), Bosnian politician
- Marijan Čavić (1915–1941), Yugoslav communist
- Milorad Čavić (born 1984), Serbian former professional swimmer
- Miroljub Čavić, Serbian basketball player

== See also ==
- Čavići
