= Kopčić =

Kopčić may refer to:

- Kopčić, Bosnia and Herzegovina, a village near Bugojno
- Kopčić family, a Bosnian noble family
