= Vedro Polje =

Vedro Polje, which translates as Clear Field in English, may refer to:

- Vedro Polje, Croatia, a village near Sunja
- Vedro Polje, Bosanski Petrovac, a village in Bosnia and Herzegovina
- Vedro Polje, Bugojno, a village in Bosnia and Herzegovina
