= Kandija =

Kandija may refer to:

- Kandija, Bugojno, a village in the municipality of Bugojno, Bosnia and Herzegovina
- Kandija, Novo Mesto, a former village in southeastern Slovenia in the Municipality of Novo Mesto, now part of the city of Novo Mesto
