= Milanovići =

Milanovići may refer to:

- Milanovići (Bugojno), a village in Bosnia and Herzegovina
- Milanovići (Goražde), a village in Bosnia and Herzegovina
