= Karadže =

Karadže Караџе
- Village
- Location within Bosnia and Herzegovina
- Country: Bosnia and Herzegovina
- Entity: Federation of Bosnia and Herzegovina
- Canton: Central Bosnia
- Municipality: Bugojno

Area
  - Total: 1.03 sq mi (2.66 km^{2})

Population (2013)
  - Total: 1,194
  - Density: 1,160/sq mi (449/km^{2})
- Time zone: UTC+1 (CET)
  - Summer (DST): UTC+2 (CEST)

Karadže (Serbian: Караџе) is a village in the municipality of Bugojno, Bosnia and Herzegovina.

== Demographics ==
According to the 2013 census, its population was 1,194.

Ethnicity in 2013
Ethnicity	Number	Percentage
Bosniaks	1,088	91.1%
Croats	85	7.1%
Serbs	1	0.1%
other/undeclared	20	1.7%
Total	1,194	100%
