= Hum, Bugojno =

Hum Хум
- Village
- Location within Bosnia and Herzegovina
- Coordinates: 44°02′16″N 17°34′03″E
- Country: Bosnia and Herzegovina
- Entity: Federation of Bosnia and Herzegovina
- Canton: Central Bosnia
- Municipality: Bugojno

Area
  - Total: 3.71 sq mi (9.61 km^{2})

Population (2013)
  - Total: 48
  - Density: 13/sq mi (5.0/km^{2})
- Time zone: UTC+1 (CET)
  - Summer (DST): UTC+2 (CEST)

Hum (Serbian: Хум) is a village in the municipality of Bugojno, Bosnia and Herzegovina.

== Demographics ==
According to the 2013 census, its population was 48, all Bosniaks.
