= Donji Boganovci =

Donji Boganovci Доњи Богановци
- Village
- Location within Bosnia and Herzegovina
- Country: Bosnia and Herzegovina
- Entity: Federation of Bosnia and Herzegovina
- Canton: Central Bosnia
- Municipality: Bugojno

Area
  - Total: 0.61 sq mi (1.58 km^{2})

Population (2013)
  - Total: 108
  - Density: 177/sq mi (68.4/km^{2})
- Time zone: UTC+1 (CET)
  - Summer (DST): UTC+2 (CEST)

Donji Boganovci (Serbian: Доњи Богановци) is a village in the municipality of Bugojno, Bosnia and Herzegovina.

== Demographics ==
According to the 2013 census, its population was 108.

Ethnicity in 2013
Ethnicity	Number	Percentage
Croats	103	95.4%
Bosniaks	5	4.6%
Total	108	100%
