= Gornji Boganovci =

Gornji Boganovci Горњи Богановци
- Village
- Location within Bosnia and Herzegovina
- Country: Bosnia and Herzegovina
- Entity: Federation of Bosnia and Herzegovina
- Canton: Central Bosnia
- Municipality: Bugojno

Area
  - Total: 0.58 sq mi (1.49 km^{2})

Population (2013)
  - Total: 71
  - Density: 120/sq mi (48/km^{2})
- Time zone: UTC+1 (CET)
  - Summer (DST): UTC+2 (CEST)

Gornji Boganovci (Serbian: Горњи Богановци) is a village in the municipality of Bugojno, Bosnia and Herzegovina.

== Demographics ==
According to the 2013 census, its population was 71.

Ethnicity in 2013
Ethnicity	Number	Percentage
Bosniaks	70	98.6%
other/undeclared	1	1.4%
Total	71	100%
