= Podripci =

Podripci Подрипци
- Village
- Location within Bosnia and Herzegovina
- Coordinates: 44°07′N 17°28′E
- Country: Bosnia and Herzegovina
- Entity: Federation of Bosnia and Herzegovina
- Canton: Central Bosnia
- Municipality: Bugojno

Area
  - Total: 0.91 sq mi (2.35 km^{2})

Population (2013)
  - Total: 153
  - Density: 169/sq mi (65.1/km^{2})
- Time zone: UTC+1 (CET)
  - Summer (DST): UTC+2 (CEST)

Podripci (Serbian: Подрипци) is a village in the municipality of Bugojno, Bosnia and Herzegovina.

== Demographics ==
According to the 2013 census, its population was 153.

Ethnicity in 2013
| Ethnicity | Number | Percentage |
|---|---|---|
| Bosniaks | 151 | 98.7% |
| Croats | 2 | 1.3% |
| Total | 153 | 100% |
