= Stojići, Bosnia and Herzegovina =

Stojići Стојићи
- Village
- Location within Bosnia and Herzegovina
- Coordinates: 44°07′07″N 17°30′00″E
- Country: Bosnia and Herzegovina
- Entity: Federation of Bosnia and Herzegovina
- Canton: Central Bosnia
- Municipality: Bugojno

Area
  - Total: 0.81 sq mi (2.09 km^{2})

Population (2013)
  - Total: 0
  - Density: 0.0/sq mi (0.0/km^{2})
- Time zone: UTC+1 (CET)
  - Summer (DST): UTC+2 (CEST)

Stojići (Serbian: Стојићи) is a former village in the municipality of Bugojno, Bosnia and Herzegovina.

== Demographics ==
According to the 2013 census, its population was nil, down from 81 in 1991.
