= Ždralovići =

Ždralovići Ждраловићи
- Village
- Location within Bosnia and Herzegovina
- Coordinates: 44°04′11″N 17°23′39″E
- Country: Bosnia and Herzegovina
- Entity: Federation of Bosnia and Herzegovina
- Canton: Central Bosnia
- Municipality: Bugojno

Area
  - Total: 4.20 sq mi (10.88 km^{2})

Population (2013)
  - Total: 382
  - Density: 90.9/sq mi (35.1/km^{2})
- Time zone: UTC+1 (CET)
  - Summer (DST): UTC+2 (CEST)

Ždralovići (Serbian: Ждраловићи) is a village in the municipality of Bugojno, Bosnia and Herzegovina.

== Demographics ==
According to the 2013 census, its population was 382.

Ethnicity in 2013
Ethnicity	Number	Percentage
Bosniaks	265	69.4%
Croats	117	30.6%
Total	382	100%
