= Kordići =

Kordići Кордићи
- Village
- Location within Bosnia and Herzegovina
- Coordinates: 43°58′47″N 17°27′54″E
- Country: Bosnia and Herzegovina
- Entity: Federation of Bosnia and Herzegovina
- Canton: Central Bosnia
- Municipality: Bugojno

Area
  - Total: 3.47 sq mi (9.00 km^{2})

Population (2013)
  - Total: 124
  - Density: 35.7/sq mi (13.8/km^{2})
- Time zone: UTC+1 (CET)
  - Summer (DST): UTC+2 (CEST)

Kordići (Serbian: Кордићи) is a village in the municipality of Bugojno, Bosnia and Herzegovina.

== Demographics ==
According to the 2013 census, its population was 124.

Ethnicity in 2013
Ethnicity	Number	Percentage
Bosniaks	120	96.8%
Croats	4	3.2%
Total	124	100%
