= Golo Brdo (Bugojno) =

Golo Brdo Голо Брдо
- Village
- Location within Bosnia and Herzegovina
- Coordinates: 44°01′52″N 17°29′59″E
- Country: Bosnia and Herzegovina
- Entity: Federation of Bosnia and Herzegovina
- Canton: Central Bosnia
- Municipality: Bugojno

Area
  - Total: 1.16 sq mi (3.00 km^{2})

Population (2013)
  - Total: 200
  - Density: 170/sq mi (67/km^{2})
- Time zone: UTC+1 (CET)
  - Summer (DST): UTC+2 (CEST)

Golo Brdo (Serbian: Голо Брдо) is a village in the municipality of Bugojno, Bosnia and Herzegovina.

== Demographics ==
According to the 2013 census, its population was 200.

Ethnicity in 2013
| Ethnicity | Number | Percentage |
|---|---|---|
| Bosniaks | 179 | 89.5% |
| Croats | 21 | 10.5% |
| Total | 200 | 100% |
