= Kotezi (Bugojno) =

Kotezi Котези
- Village
- Location within Bosnia and Herzegovina
- Coordinates: 44°04′15″N 17°25′04″E
- Country: Bosnia and Herzegovina
- Entity: Federation of Bosnia and Herzegovina
- Canton: Central Bosnia
- Municipality: Bugojno

Area
  - Total: 0.90 sq mi (2.34 km^{2})

Population (2013)
  - Total: 120
  - Density: 130/sq mi (51/km^{2})
- Time zone: UTC+1 (CET)
  - Summer (DST): UTC+2 (CEST)

Kotezi (Serbian: Котези) is a village in the municipality of Bugojno, Bosnia and Herzegovina.

== Demographics ==
According to the 2013 census, its population was 120.

Ethnicity in 2013
Ethnicity	Number	Percentage
Bosniaks	113	94.2%
Croats	7	5.8%
Total	120	100%
