= Lug (Bugojno) =

Lug Луг
- Village
- Location within Bosnia and Herzegovina
- Country: Bosnia and Herzegovina
- Entity: Federation of Bosnia and Herzegovina
- Canton: Central Bosnia
- Municipality: Bugojno

Area
  - Total: 0.65 sq mi (1.68 km^{2})

Population (2013)
  - Total: 267
  - Density: 412/sq mi (159/km^{2})
- Time zone: UTC+1 (CET)
  - Summer (DST): UTC+2 (CEST)

Lug (Serbian: Луг) is a village in the municipality of Bugojno, Bosnia and Herzegovina.

== Demographics ==
According to the 2013 census, its population was 267.

Ethnicity in 2013
Ethnicity	Number	Percentage
Croats	258	96.6%
Bosniaks	8	3.0%
Serbs	1	0.4%
Total	267	100%
