= Garačići =

Garačići Гарачићи
- Village
- Location within Bosnia and Herzegovina
- Coordinates: 44°02′N 17°25′E
- Country: Bosnia and Herzegovina
- Entity: Federation of Bosnia and Herzegovina
- Canton: Central Bosnia
- Municipality: Bugojno

Area
  - Total: 0.35 sq mi (0.91 km^{2})

Population (2013)
  - Total: 644
  - Density: 1,800/sq mi (710/km^{2})
- Time zone: UTC+1 (CET)
  - Summer (DST): UTC+2 (CEST)

Garačići (Serbian: Гарачићи) is a village in the municipality of Bugojno, Bosnia and Herzegovina.

== Demographics ==
According to the 2013 census, its population was 644.

Ethnicity in 2013
Ethnicity	Number	Percentage
Bosniaks	554	86.0%
Croats	76	11.8%
other/undeclared	14	2.2%
Total	644	100%
