= Zlavast =

Zlavast Злаваст
- Village
- Location within Bosnia and Herzegovina
- Coordinates: 44°01′N 17°29′E
- Country: Bosnia and Herzegovina
- Entity: Federation of Bosnia and Herzegovina
- Canton: Central Bosnia
- Municipality: Bugojno

Area
  - Total: 2.16 sq mi (5.59 km^{2})

Population (2013)
  - Total: 242
  - Density: 112/sq mi (43.3/km^{2})
- Time zone: UTC+1 (CET)
  - Summer (DST): UTC+2 (CEST)

Zlavast (Serbian: Злаваст) is a village in the municipality of Bugojno, Bosnia and Herzegovina. It is roughly 70 km west of Sarajevo.

== Demographics ==
According to the 2013 census, its population was 242.

Ethnicity in 2013
Ethnicity	Number	Percentage
Bosniaks	201	83.1%
Croats	21	8.7%
other/undeclared	20	8.3%
Total	242	100%
