= Kunovci, Bosnia and Herzegovina =

Kulovci Bulovci
- Village
- Location within Republika Srpska Location within Bosnia and Herzegovina
- Coordinates: 44°01′00″N 19°26′29″E
- Country: Bosnia and Herzegovina
- Entity: Republika Srpska
- Municipality: Srebrenica
- Elevation: 2,385 ft (727 m)
- Time zone: UTC+1 (CET)
  - Summer (DST): UTC+2 (CEST)

Kunovci is a village near Tokoljak in the Srebrenica municipality, Republika Srpska, Bosnia and Herzegovina Bosnia and Herzegovina.
