= Rosulje (Bugojno) =

Rosulje Росуље
- Village
- Location within Bosnia and Herzegovina
- Country: Bosnia and Herzegovina
- Entity: Federation of Bosnia and Herzegovina
- Canton: Central Bosnia
- Municipality: Bugojno

Area
  - Total: 0.63 sq mi (1.64 km^{2})

Population (2013)
  - Total: 143
  - Density: 226/sq mi (87.2/km^{2})
- Time zone: UTC+1 (CET)
  - Summer (DST): UTC+2 (CEST)

Rosulje (Serbian: Росуље) is a village in the municipality of Bugojno, Bosnia and Herzegovina.

== Demographics ==
According to the 2013 census, its population was 143.

Ethnicity in 2013
Ethnicity	Number	Percentage
Croats	135	94.4%
Bosniaks	8	5.6%
Total	143	100%
