= Hapstići =

Hapstići Хапстићи
- Village
- Location within Bosnia and Herzegovina
- Coordinates: 44°02′N 17°31′E
- Country: Bosnia and Herzegovina
- Entity: Federation of Bosnia and Herzegovina
- Canton: Central Bosnia
- Municipality: Bugojno

Area
  - Total: 1.52 sq mi (3.94 km^{2})

Population (2013)
  - Total: 153
  - Density: 101/sq mi (38.8/km^{2})
- Time zone: UTC+1 (CET)
  - Summer (DST): UTC+2 (CEST)

Hapstići (Serbian: Хапстићи) is a village in the municipality of Bugojno, Bosnia and Herzegovina.

== Demographics ==
According to the 2013 census, its population was 153.

Ethnicity in 2013
Ethnicity	Number	Percentage
Bosniaks	141	92.2%
Serbs	12	7.8%
Total	153	100%
