= Servani =

Servani Сервани
- Village
- Location within Bosnia and Herzegovina
- Coordinates: 44°08′N 17°29′E
- Country: Bosnia and Herzegovina
- Entity: Federation of Bosnia and Herzegovina
- Canton: Central Bosnia
- Municipality: Bugojno

Area
  - Total: 1.31 km^{2} (0.51 sq mi)

Population (2013)
  - Total: 7
  - Density: 5.3/km^{2} (14/sq mi)
- Time zone: UTC+1 (CET)
  - Summer (DST): UTC+2 (CEST)

Servani (Serbian: Сервани) is a village in the municipality of Bugojno, Bosnia and Herzegovina. It is located 76 kilometres (47 miles) northwest of the capital, Sarajevo.

== Demographics ==
According to the 2013 census, its population was 7, all Bosniaks.
