= Trge =

Trge Трге
- Village
- Location within Bosnia and Herzegovina
- Coordinates: 44°07′34″N 17°31′09″E
- Country: Bosnia and Herzegovina
- Entity: Federation of Bosnia and Herzegovina
- Canton: Central Bosnia
- Municipality: Bugojno

Area
  - Total: 139 sq mi (361 km^{2})
- Elevation: 3,349 ft (1,021 m)

Population (2013)
  - Total: 0
  - Density: 0/sq mi (0/km^{2})
- Time zone: UTC+01:00 (CET)
  - Summer (DST): UTC+02:00 (CEST)

Trge (Serbian: Трге) is a village in the municipality of Bugojno, Bosnia and Herzegovina. According to the 2013 Bosnian census, there are no inhabitants of Trge.

== Demography ==
Historical population

Year	Pop.	±%
1961	66	—
1971	66	+0.0%
1981	48	−27.3%

Year	Pop.	±%
1991	19	−60.4%
2013	0	−100.0%

Source data

In 1991, all 19 villagers were Serbian.
