= Lenđerovina =

Lenđerovina Ленђеровина
- Village
- Location within Bosnia and Herzegovina
- Coordinates: 44°06′41″N 17°28′46″E
- Country: Bosnia and Herzegovina
- Entity: Federation of Bosnia and Herzegovina
- Canton: Central Bosnia
- Municipality: Bugojno

Area
  - Total: 1.25 sq mi (3.23 km^{2})

Population (2013)
  - Total: 86
  - Density: 69/sq mi (27/km^{2})
- Time zone: UTC+1 (CET)
  - Summer (DST): UTC+2 (CEST)

Lenđerovina (Serbian: Ленђеровина) is a village in the municipality of Bugojno, Bosnia and Herzegovina.

== Demographics ==
According to the 2013 census, its population was 86.

Ethnicity in 2013
Ethnicity	Number	Percentage
Bosniaks	85	98.8%
Croats	1	1.2%
Total	86	100%
