= Kula (Bugojno) =

- Village
- Location within Bosnia and Herzegovina
- Country: Bosnia and Herzegovina
- Entity: Federation of Bosnia and Herzegovina
- Canton: Central Bosnia
- Municipality: Bugojno

Area
  - Total: 0.81 sq mi (2.10 km^{2})

Population (2013)
  - Total: 864
  - Density: 1,070/sq mi (411/km^{2})
- Time zone: UTC+1 (CET)
  - Summer (DST): UTC+2 (CEST)

Kula is a village in the municipality of Bugojno, Bosnia and Herzegovina.

== Demographics ==
According to the 2013 census, its population was 864.

Ethnicity in 2013
Ethnicity	Number	Percentage
Bosniaks	636	73.6%
Croats	181	20.9%
other/undeclared	47	5.4%
Total	864	100%
