= Glavice (Bugojno) =

Glavice Главице
- Village
- Location within Bosnia and Herzegovina
- Country: Bosnia and Herzegovina
- Entity: Federation of Bosnia and Herzegovina
- Canton: Central Bosnia
- Municipality: Bugojno

Area
  - Total: 1.17 sq mi (3.04 km^{2})

Population (2013)
  - Total: 650
  - Density: 550/sq mi (210/km^{2})
- Time zone: UTC+1 (CET)
  - Summer (DST): UTC+2 (CEST)

Glavice (Serbian: Главице) is a village in the municipality of Bugojno, Bosnia and Herzegovina.

== Demographics ==
According to the 2013 census, its population was 650.

Ethnicity in 2013
Ethnicity	Number	Percentage
Bosniaks	647	99.5%
other/undeclared	3	0.5%
Total	650	100%
