= Ivica (Bugojno) =

Ivica Ивица
- Village
- Location within Bosnia and Herzegovina
- Coordinates: 43°56′42″N 17°26′59″E
- Country: Bosnia and Herzegovina
- Entity: Federation of Bosnia and Herzegovina
- Canton: Central Bosnia
- Municipality: Bugojno

Area
  - Total: 1.51 sq mi (3.92 km^{2})

Population (2013)
  - Total: 8
  - Density: 5.3/sq mi (2.0/km^{2})
- Time zone: UTC+1 (CET)
  - Summer (DST): UTC+2 (CEST)

Ivica (Serbian: Ивица) is a village in the municipality of Bugojno, Bosnia and Herzegovina.

== Demographics ==
According to the 2013 census, its population was 8, all Bosniaks.
