= Bevrnjići =

Bevrnjići Беврњићи
- Village
- Location within Bosnia and Herzegovina
- Coordinates: 44°03′N 17°25′E
- Country: Bosnia and Herzegovina
- Entity: Federation of Bosnia and Herzegovina
- Canton: Central Bosnia
- Municipality: Bugojno

Area
  - Total: 5.51 sq mi (14.27 km^{2})

Population (2013)
  - Total: 173
  - Density: 31.4/sq mi (12.1/km^{2})
- Time zone: UTC+1 (CET)
  - Summer (DST): UTC+2 (CEST)

Bevrnjići (Serbian: Беврњићи) is a village in the municipality of Bugojno, Bosnia and Herzegovina.

== Demographics ==
According to the 2013 census, its population was 173.

Ethnicity in 2013
Ethnicity	Number	Percentage
Bosniaks	108	62.4%
Croats	64	37.0%
other/undeclared	1	0.6%
Total	173	100%
