= Pirići (Bugojno) =

Pirići Пирићи
- Village
- Location within Bosnia and Herzegovina
- Coordinates: 44°05′50″N 17°27′59″E
- Country: Bosnia and Herzegovina
- Entity: Federation of Bosnia and Herzegovina
- Canton: Central Bosnia
- Municipality: Bugojno

Area
  - Total: 0.60 sq mi (1.56 km^{2})

Population (2013)
  - Total: 213
  - Density: 354/sq mi (137/km^{2})
- Time zone: UTC+1 (CET)
  - Summer (DST): UTC+2 (CEST)

Pirići (Serbian: Пирићи) is a village in the municipality of Bugojno, Bosnia and Herzegovina.

== Demographics ==
According to the 2013 census, its population was 213.

Ethnicity in 2013
Ethnicity	Number	Percentage
Bosniaks	212	99.5%
other/undeclared	1	0.5%
Total	213	100%
