= Alibegovići =

Alibegovići Алибеговићи
- Village
- Location within Bosnia and Herzegovina
- Coordinates: 44°03′00″N 17°24′36″E
- Country: Bosnia and Herzegovina
- Entity: Federation of Bosnia and Herzegovina
- Canton: Central Bosnia
- Municipality: Bugojno

Area
  - Total: 0.25 sq mi (0.64 km^{2})

Population (2013)
  - Total: 438
  - Density: 1,800/sq mi (680/km^{2})
- Time zone: UTC+1 (CET)
  - Summer (DST): UTC+2 (CEST)

Alibegovići (Serbian: Алибеговићи) is a village in the municipality of Bugojno, Bosnia and Herzegovina.

== Demographics ==
According to the 2013 census, its population was 438.

Ethnicity in 2013
Ethnicity	Number	Percentage
Bosniaks	338	77.2%
Croats	84	19.2%
Serbs	4	0.9%
other/undeclared	12	2.7%
Total	438	100%
