= Drvetine =

Drvetine Дрветине
- Village
- Location within Bosnia and Herzegovina
- Coordinates: 44°06′N 17°27′E
- Country: Bosnia and Herzegovina
- Entity: Federation of Bosnia and Herzegovina
- Canton: Central Bosnia
- Municipality: Bugojno

Area
  - Total: 0.72 sq mi (1.87 km^{2})

Population (2013)
  - Total: 196
  - Density: 271/sq mi (105/km^{2})
- Time zone: UTC+1 (CET)
  - Summer (DST): UTC+2 (CEST)

Drvetine (Serbian: Дрветине) is a village in the municipality of Bugojno, Bosnia and Herzegovina.

== Demographics ==
According to the 2013 census, its population was 196.

Ethnicity in 2013
Ethnicity	Number	Percentage
Bosniaks	159	81.1%
Croats	37	18.9%
Total	196	100%
