= Bristovi =

Bristovi Бристови
- Village
- Location within Bosnia and Herzegovina
- Coordinates: 44°04′N 17°29′E
- Country: Bosnia and Herzegovina
- Entity: Federation of Bosnia and Herzegovina
- Canton: Central Bosnia
- Municipality: Bugojno

Area
  - Total: 0.48 sq mi (1.24 km^{2})

Population (2013)
  - Total: 117
  - Density: 244/sq mi (94.4/km^{2})
- Time zone: UTC+1 (CET)
  - Summer (DST): UTC+2 (CEST)

Bristovi (Bosnian: Bristovi/Бристови) is a village in the municipality of Bugojno, Bosnia and Herzegovina.

== Demographics ==
According to the 2013 census, its population was 117.

Ethnicity in 2013
Ethnicity	Number	Percentage
Croats	116	99.1%
Serbs	1	0.9%
Total	117	100%
