= Vileši =

Vileši Вилеши
- Village
- Location within Bosnia and Herzegovina
- Coordinates: 44°03′N 17°30′E
- Country: Bosnia and Herzegovina
- Entity: Federation of Bosnia and Herzegovina
- Canton: Central Bosnia
- Municipality: Bugojno

Area
  - Total: 0.29 sq mi (0.75 km^{2})

Population (2013)
  - Total: 240
  - Density: 830/sq mi (320/km^{2})
- Time zone: UTC+1 (CET)
  - Summer (DST): UTC+2 (CEST)

Vileši (Serbian: Вилеши) is a village in the municipality of Bugojno, Bosnia and Herzegovina.

== Demographics ==
According to the 2013 census, its population was 240, all Bosniaks.
