= Zanesovići =

Zanesovići Занесовићи
- Village
- Location within Bosnia and Herzegovina
- Coordinates: 44°01′N 17°31′E
- Country: Bosnia and Herzegovina
- Entity: Federation of Bosnia and Herzegovina
- Canton: Central Bosnia
- Municipality: Bugojno

Area
  - Total: 1.16 sq mi (3.01 km^{2})

Population (2013)
  - Total: 309
  - Density: 266/sq mi (103/km^{2})
- Time zone: UTC+1 (CET)
  - Summer (DST): UTC+2 (CEST)

Zanesovići (Serbian Cyrillic: Занесовићи) is a village in the municipality of Bugojno, Bosnia and Herzegovina. In 1991, it had a population of 473.

== Demographics ==
According to the 2013 census, its population was 309.

Ethnicity in 2013
| Ethnicity | Number | Percentage |
|---|---|---|
| Bosniaks | 292 | 94.5% |
| Croats | 14 | 4.5% |
| other/undeclared | 3 | 1.0% |
| Total | 309 | 100% |
