= Goruša =

Goruša Горуша
- Village
- Location within Bosnia and Herzegovina
- Coordinates: 44°01′34″N 17°30′14″E
- Country: Bosnia and Herzegovina
- Entity: Federation of Bosnia and Herzegovina
- Canton: Central Bosnia
- Municipality: Bugojno

Area
  - Total: 0.87 sq mi (2.26 km^{2})

Population (2013)
  - Total: 107
  - Density: 123/sq mi (47.3/km^{2})
- Time zone: UTC+1 (CET)
  - Summer (DST): UTC+2 (CEST)

Goruša (Serbian: Горуша) is a village in the municipality of Bugojno, Bosnia and Herzegovina.

== Demographics ==
According to the 2013 census, its population was 107.

Ethnicity in 2013
Ethnicity	Number	Percentage
Bosniaks	78	72.9%
Croats	29	27.1%
Total	107	100%
