= Ceribašići =

Ceribašići Церибашићи
- Village
- Location within Bosnia and Herzegovina
- Coordinates: 44°07′N 17°27′E
- Country: Bosnia and Herzegovina
- Entity: Federation of Bosnia and Herzegovina
- Canton: Central Bosnia
- Municipality: Bugojno

Area
  - Total: 0.70 sq mi (1.82 km^{2})

Population (2013)
  - Total: 270
  - Density: 380/sq mi (150/km^{2})
- Time zone: UTC+1 (CET)
  - Summer (DST): UTC+2 (CEST)

Ceribašići (Serbian: Церибашићи) is a village in the municipality of Bugojno, Bosnia and Herzegovina.

== Demographics ==
According to the 2013 census, its population was 270.

Ethnicity in 2013
Ethnicity	Number	Percentage
Bosniaks	267	98.9%
other/undeclared	3	1.1%
Total	270	100%
