= Ljubnić =

- Village
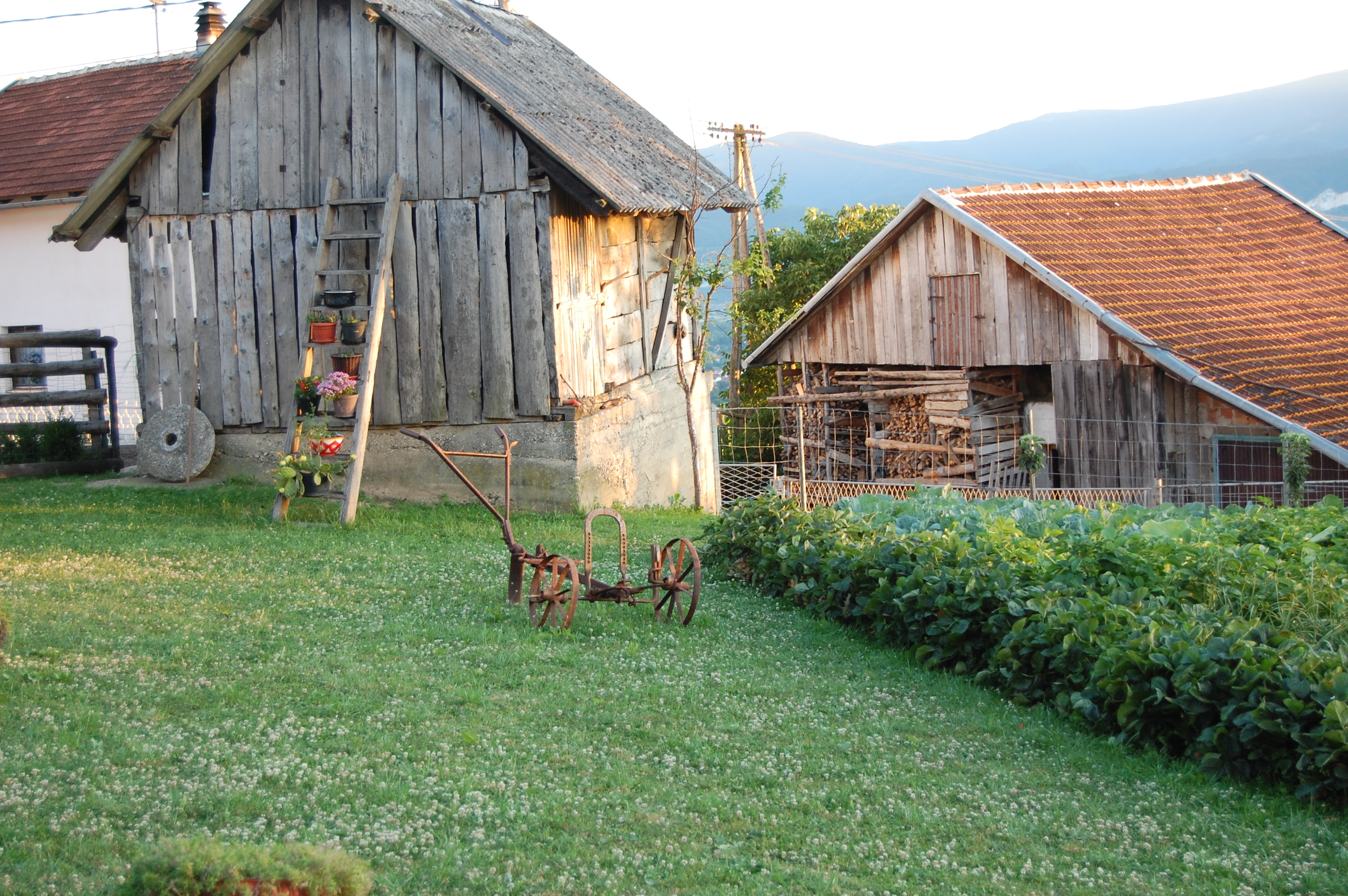

- Location within Bosnia and Herzegovina
- Country: Bosnia and Herzegovina
- Entity: Federation of Bosnia and Herzegovina
- Canton: Central Bosnia
- Municipality: Bugojno

Area
  - Total: 2.62 sq mi (6.79 km^{2})

Population (2013)
  - Total: 386
  - Density: 147/sq mi (56.8/km^{2})
- Time zone: UTC+1 (CET)
  - Summer (DST): UTC+2 (CEST)

Ljubnić is a village in the municipality of Bugojno, Bosnia and Herzegovina.

== Demographics ==
According to the 2013 census, its population was 386.

Ethnicity in 2013
Ethnicity	Number	Percentage
Bosniaks	385	99.7%
other/undeclared	1	0.3%
Total	386	100%
