= Skrte =

Skrte Скрте
- Village
- Location within Bosnia and Herzegovina
- Coordinates: 43°57′N 17°26′E
- Country: Bosnia and Herzegovina
- Entity: Federation of Bosnia and Herzegovina
- Canton: Central Bosnia
- Municipality: Bugojno

Area
  - Total: 5.17 sq mi (13.38 km^{2})

Population (2013)
  - Total: 32
  - Density: 6.2/sq mi (2.4/km^{2})
- Time zone: UTC+1 (CET)
  - Summer (DST): UTC+2 (CEST)

Skrte (Serbian: Скрте) is a village in the municipality of Bugojno, Bosnia and Herzegovina.

== Demographics ==
According to the 2013 census, its population was 32, all Bosniaks.
