= Udurlije =

- Village
- Location within Bosnia and Herzegovina
- Country: Bosnia and Herzegovina
- Entity: Federation of Bosnia and Herzegovina
- Canton: Central Bosnia
- Municipality: Bugojno

Area
  - Total: 1.83 sq mi (4.74 km^{2})

Population (2013)
  - Total: 296
  - Density: 162/sq mi (62.4/km^{2})
- Time zone: UTC+1 (CET)
  - Summer (DST): UTC+2 (CEST)

Udurlije is a village in the municipality of Bugojno, Bosnia and Herzegovina.

== Demographics ==
According to the 2013 census, its population was 296.

Ethnicity in 2013
| Ethnicity | Number | Percentage |
|---|---|---|
| Croats | 275 | 92.9% |
| Bosniaks | 19 | 6.4% |
| Serbs | 2 | 0.7% |
| Total | 296 | 100% |
