= 1990 Bosnian municipal elections =

- 1990

The municipal elections of Bosnia and Herzegovina in 1990 were won by several parties.

In most municipalities with either a relative or absolute Bosniak majority, Party of Democratic Action (SDA) won a majority of the vote and the right to choose the mayor.

In most municipalities with either a relative or absolute Serbian majority, Serbian Democratic Party (SDS) won a majority of the vote and the right to choose the mayor. SDS also won elections in Doboj and Vogošća (which were Bosniak relative majorities).

In most municipalities with either a relative or absolute Croatian majority, Croatian Democratic Union of Bosnia and Herzegovina (HDZ) won a majority of the vote and the right to choose the mayor. Only in Vareš—a municipality with a relative Croatian majority—did HDZ not win a majority of votes. HDZ also won elections in Bugojno, Fojnica, Jajce, Žepče, Stolac and Mostar (Bosniak relative majorities) and Modriča and Derventa and Kotor Varoš (Serbian relative majorities).

Nationally, Fikret Abdić gained the most votes to become the President. He never assumed the presidency however, leaving it to Alija Izetbegović.

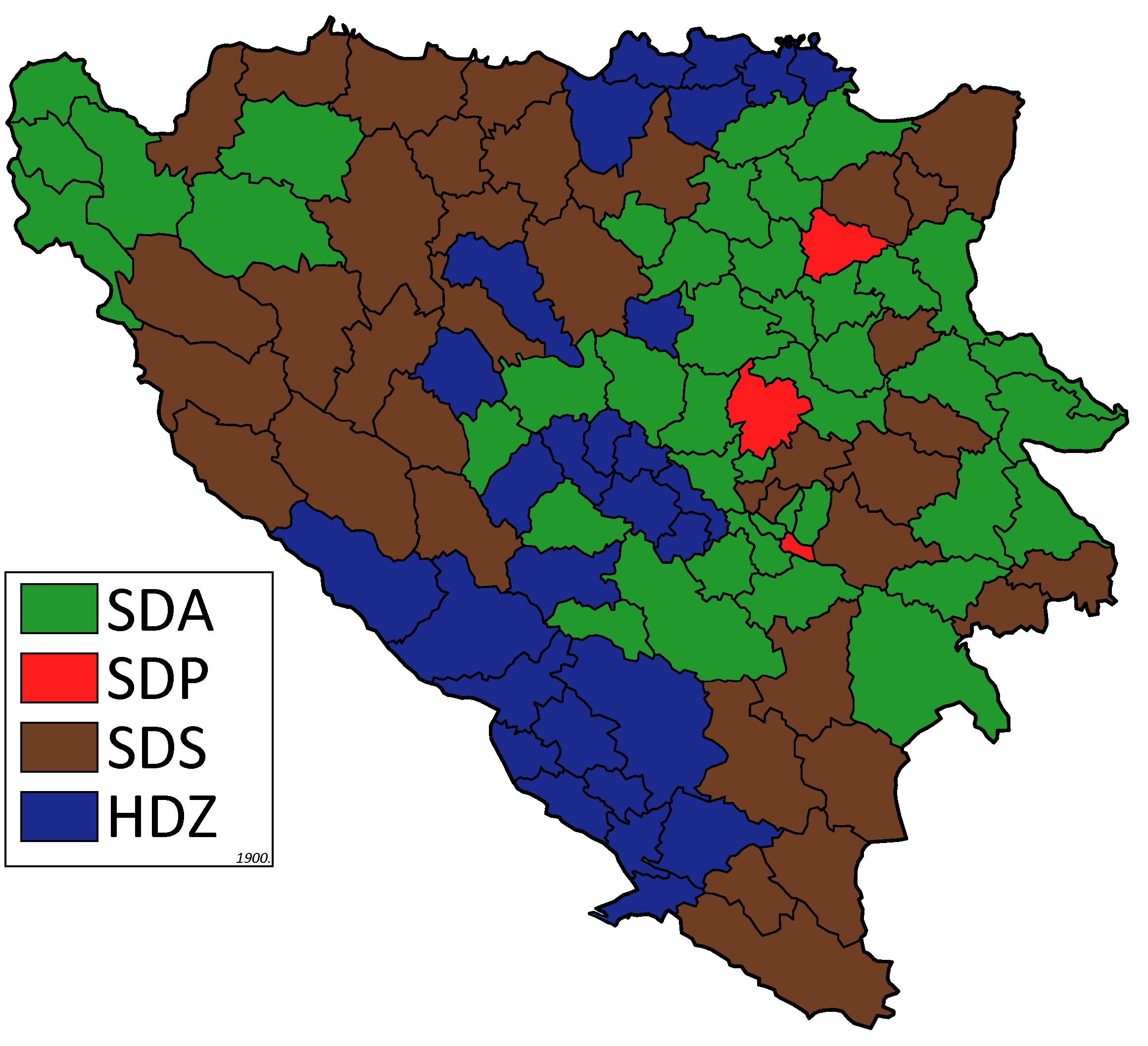
Results of the 1990 elections in Bosnian municipalities. Red are municipalities in which SDS won most votes, green for SDA, blue for HDZ and pink are those where none of the nationalistic parties achieved the right to choose a mayor. Beige are unknown.

== Results by municipality ==
Municipality	Result
Konjic	Of the 60 members of the Assembly, 28 were from the SDA, 14 from the HDZ and 9 from the SDS, and there were also representatives from other smaller parties.
Vitez	23 HDZ, 16 SDA, 9 SDP, 16 reformists, 2 SDS, 2 Youth Alliance, 1 Socialist.
Busovača	At that time the Busovaca parliament had 60 representatives. The HDZ, SDA, SDS coalition received 64 per cent of the vote. Out of its part in 64%, the HDZ got 20 representatives.
Bugojno	The municipal council elected in 1990 included 21 delegates of the HDZ, 20 of the SDA, and 9 of the Serbian Democratic Party.
Novi Travnik	The HDZ had 20 seats in the municipal 7 assembly, the SDA won 17 seats, the SDP won 10 seats, 8 the Reformists won seven seats, and the SDS won six 9 seats in the municipal assembly.
Mostar	SDA won only 19 out of 100 seats in Mostar.
Ljubuški	HDZ won 90% of seats, SDA 5%
Čapljina	HDZ won 52% of seats, SDA 20%, SDS 11%.
Kiseljak	HDZ won 45% of seats, SDA 40%.
Odžak	HDZ won 56% of seats and SDA, SDS, and SkBiH-SDP each won 12%.
Foča	SDA won 45% of seats and SDS 44%.
Trebinje	SDS won 62% of seats and SDA 13%.
Ugljevik	SDS won 51% of seats, SDA 27% and SkBiH-SDP 11%.
Modriča	HDZ won 26% of seats, SkBiH-SDP also 26%, SDS 22% and SDA 12%.
Maglaj	SDA won 34% of seats, HDZ 21%, SDS had one seat less than HDZ, and SkBiH-SDP and SRSJ each only 14% of seats.
Goražde	SDA won 58% of seats, SDS 26%.
Gradačac	SDA won 37% of seats, SDS 18%, SkBiH-SDP had one seat less than SDS, and HDZ won 15% of seats.
Sarajevo-Novi grad	SDA won 35% of seats, SDS 21%, SkBih-SDP 16% and reformists won only 15%.
Sarajevo-Centar	SDA won 30% of seats, SkBih-SDP 21%, reformists 20%, SDS 15%; there were 100 seats in summation.
Sarajevo-Stari grad	SDA won 53% of seats, SkBiH-SDP 14%, reformists(SRSJ) 11%.
Prijedor	SDA won 30 seats, the SDS 28, the HDZ 2, and 30 seats went to other parties: the opposition parties, namely the Social Democratic, the Liberal Alliance, and the Reformist parties.
Bosanski Šamac	HDZ won 21 seats, SDS 17, SkBih-SDP 6, SRS 3, SDA 2, Liberals 1.
Prnjavor	Assembly had 60 seats. SDS won 42 seats, SDP won 11, SDA won 5.
Gornji Vakuf-Uskoplje	SDA won the elections and the ratio SDA: HDZ was about 50:45.
Čelinac	SDS won about 85% of the votes, all other parties divided the rest.
Banja Luka	SDS won 41% of votes, SDA and HDZ combined for 33%, and the rest (26%) was divided by smaller parties.
Zenica	SDA and HDZ won 67% (most of it was to SDA), SDS won 9%, and the rest (24%) was divided by smaller parties.
Bihać	SDA and HDZ won 64% (most of it was to SDA), SDS won 21%, and the rest (15%) was divided by smaller parties.
Ključ	SDS had the majority in Ključ.
Travnik	SDA had the majority in Travnik
Jajce	HDZ had majority in Jajce.

Nationalistic parties did not win only in Tuzla, Vareš and Novo Sarajevo.
