= Gračanica, Bugojno =

Gračanica Грачаница
- Village
- Location within Bosnia and Herzegovina
- Coordinates: 43°59′57″N 17°29′29″E
- Country: Bosnia and Herzegovina
- Entity: Federation of Bosnia and Herzegovina
- Canton: Central Bosnia
- Municipality: Bugojno

Area
  - Total: 1.23 sq mi (3.19 km^{2})

Population (2013)
  - Total: 794
  - Density: 645/sq mi (249/km^{2})
- Time zone: UTC+1 (CET)
  - Summer (DST): UTC+2 (CEST)

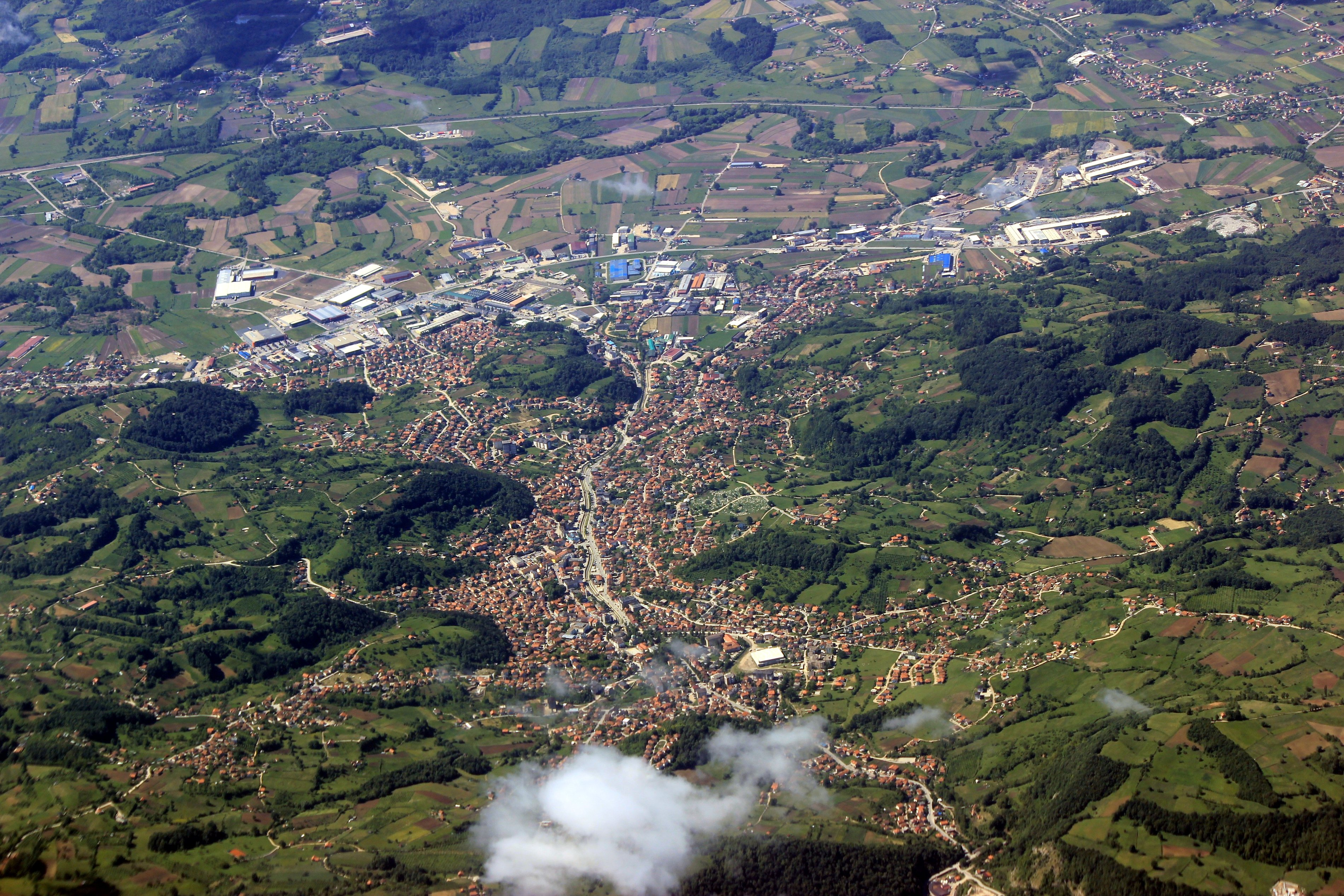
Aerial view of Gračanica

Gračanica (Serbian: Грачаница) is a village in the municipality of Bugojno, Bosnia and Herzegovina.

== Demographics ==
According to the 2013 census, its population was 794.

Ethnicity in 2013
Ethnicity	Number	Percentage
Bosniaks	713	89.8%
Croats	75	9.4%
other/undeclared	6	0.8%
Total	794	100%
