= Gredine =

Gredine Гредине
- Village
- Interactive map of Gredine
- Location within Bosnia and Herzegovina
- Coordinates: 44°04′05″N 17°30′20″E
- Country: Bosnia and Herzegovina
- Entity: Federation of Bosnia and Herzegovina
- Canton: Central Bosnia
- Municipality: Bugojno

Area
  - Total: 2.00 sq mi (5.18 km^{2})

Population (2013)
  - Total: 13
  - Density: 6.5/sq mi (2.5/km^{2})
- Time zone: UTC+1 (CET)
  - Summer (DST): UTC+2 (CEST)

Gredine (Serbian: Гредине) is a village in the municipality of Bugojno, Bosnia and Herzegovina.

== Demographics ==
According to the 2013 census, its population was 13, all Bosniaks.
