= Šići (Bugojno) =

Šići Шићи
- Village
- Location within Bosnia and Herzegovina
- Coordinates: 44°03′56″N 17°29′14″E
- Country: Bosnia and Herzegovina
- Entity: Federation of Bosnia and Herzegovina
- Canton: Central Bosnia
- Municipality: Bugojno

Area
  - Total: 0.53 sq mi (1.38 km^{2})

Population (2013)
  - Total: 322
  - Density: 604/sq mi (233/km^{2})
- Time zone: UTC+1 (CET)
  - Summer (DST): UTC+2 (CEST)

Šići (Serbian: Шићи) is a village in the municipality of Bugojno, Bosnia and Herzegovina.

== Demographics ==
According to the 2013 census, its population was 322.

Ethnicity in 2013
Ethnicity	Number	Percentage
Croats	316	98.1%
Bosniaks	4	1.2%
other/undeclared	2	0.6%
Total	322	100%
