= Milanovići (Bugojno) =

Milanovići Милановићи
- Village
- Location within Bosnia and Herzegovina
- Coordinates: 44°04′33″N 17°25′28″E
- Country: Bosnia and Herzegovina
- Entity: Federation of Bosnia and Herzegovina
- Canton: Central Bosnia
- Municipality: Bugojno

Area
  - Total: 0.21 sq mi (0.55 km^{2})

Population (2013)
  - Total: 144
  - Density: 680/sq mi (260/km^{2})
- Time zone: UTC+1 (CET)
  - Summer (DST): UTC+2 (CEST)

Milanovići (Serbian: Милановићи) is a village in the municipality of Bugojno, Bosnia and Herzegovina.

== Demographics ==
According to the 2013 census, its population was 144.

Ethnicity in 2013
Ethnicity	Number	Percentage
Bosniaks	136	94.4%
Croats	7	4.9%
other/undeclared	1	0.7%
Total	144	100%
