= Seferovići (Bugojno) =

- Village
- Location within Bosnia and Herzegovina
- Coordinates: 44°03′43″N 17°29′36″E
- Country: Bosnia and Herzegovina
- Entity: Federation of Bosnia and Herzegovina
- Canton: Central Bosnia
- Municipality: Bugojno

Area
  - Total: 0.33 sq mi (0.86 km^{2})

Population (2013)
  - Total: 145
  - Density: 440/sq mi (170/km^{2})
- Time zone: UTC+1 (CET)
  - Summer (DST): UTC+2 (CEST)

Seferovići is a village in the municipality of Bugojno, Bosnia and Herzegovina.

== Demographics ==
According to the 2013 census, its population was 145, all Bosniaks.
