= Pavice =

Pavice Павице
- Village
- Location within Bosnia and Herzegovina
- Coordinates: 44°01′N 17°32′E
- Country: Bosnia and Herzegovina
- Entity: Federation of Bosnia and Herzegovina
- Canton: Central Bosnia
- Municipality: Bugojno

Area
  - Total: 2.07 sq mi (5.35 km^{2})

Population (2013)
  - Total: 218
  - Density: 106/sq mi (40.7/km^{2})
- Time zone: UTC+1 (CET)
  - Summer (DST): UTC+2 (CEST)

Pavice (Serbian: Павице) is a village in the municipality of Bugojno, Bosnia and Herzegovina.

== Demographics ==
According to the 2013 census, its population was 218.

Ethnicity in 2013
Ethnicity	Number	Percentage
Bosniaks	213	97.7%
Croats	4	1.8%
other/undeclared	1	0.7%
Total	218	100%
