= Kandija, Bugojno =

Kandija
- Village
- Location within Bosnia and Herzegovina
- Coordinates: 44°02′N 17°29′E
- Country: Bosnia and Herzegovina
- Entity: Federation of Bosnia and Herzegovina
- Canton: Central Bosnia
- Municipality: Bugojno

Area
  - Total: 1.35 sq mi (3.49 km^{2})

Population (2013)
  - Total: 324
  - Density: 240/sq mi (92.8/km^{2})
- Time zone: UTC+1 (CET)
  - Summer (DST): UTC+2 (CEST)

Kandija is a village in the municipality of Bugojno, Bosnia and Herzegovina.

== Demographics ==
According to the 2013 census, its population was 324.

Ethnicity in 2013
Ethnicity	Number	Percentage
Croats	323	99.7%
other/undeclared	1	0.3%
Total	324	100%
