= Kopčić, Bosnia and Herzegovina =

Kopčić Копчић
- Village
- Location within Bosnia and Herzegovina
- Coordinates: 44°07′N 17°25′E
- Country: Bosnia and Herzegovina
- Entity: Federation of Bosnia and Herzegovina
- Canton: Central Bosnia
- Municipality: Bugojno

Area
  - Total: 2.22 sq mi (5.74 km^{2})

Population (2013)
  - Total: 636
  - Density: 287/sq mi (111/km^{2})
- Time zone: UTC+1 (CET)
  - Summer (DST): UTC+2 (CEST)

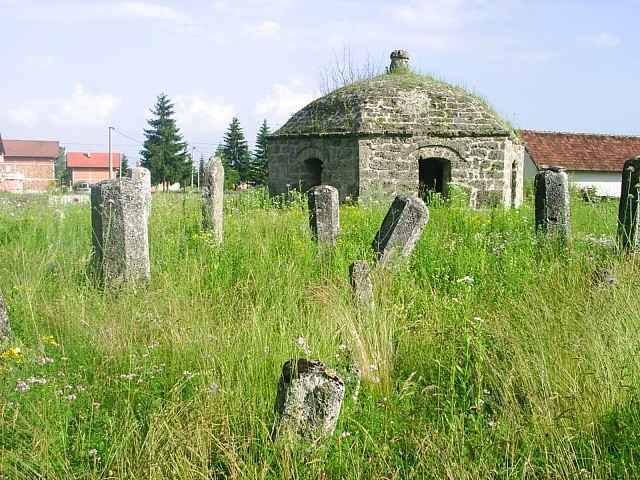
An old muslim cemetery in Kopčić

Kopčić (Serbian: Копчић) is a village in the municipality of Bugojno, Bosnia and Herzegovina.

== Demographics ==
According to the 2013 census, its population was 636.

Ethnicity in 2013
Ethnicity	Number	Percentage
Bosniaks	553	86.9%
Croats	58	9.1%
Serbs	19	3.0%
other/undeclared	6	0.9%
Total	636	100%
