= Rovna, Bugojno =

Rovna
- Village
- Location within Bosnia and Herzegovina
- Coordinates: 44°07′N 17°49′E
- Country: Bosnia and Herzegovina
- Entity: Federation of Bosnia and Herzegovina
- Canton: Central Bosnia
- Municipality: Bugojno

Area
  - Total: 6.29 sq mi (16.28 km^{2})

Population (2013)
  - Total: 631
  - Density: 100/sq mi (38.8/km^{2})
- Time zone: UTC+1 (CET)
  - Summer (DST): UTC+2 (CEST)

Rovna is a village in the municipality of Bugojno, Bosnia and Herzegovina.

== Demographics ==
According to the 2013 census, its population was 631.

Ethnicity in 2013
Ethnicity	Number	Percentage
Bosniaks	627	99.4%
Croats	2	0.3%
other/undeclared	2	0.3%
Total	631	100%
