= Rovná (Strakonice District) =

- Municipality
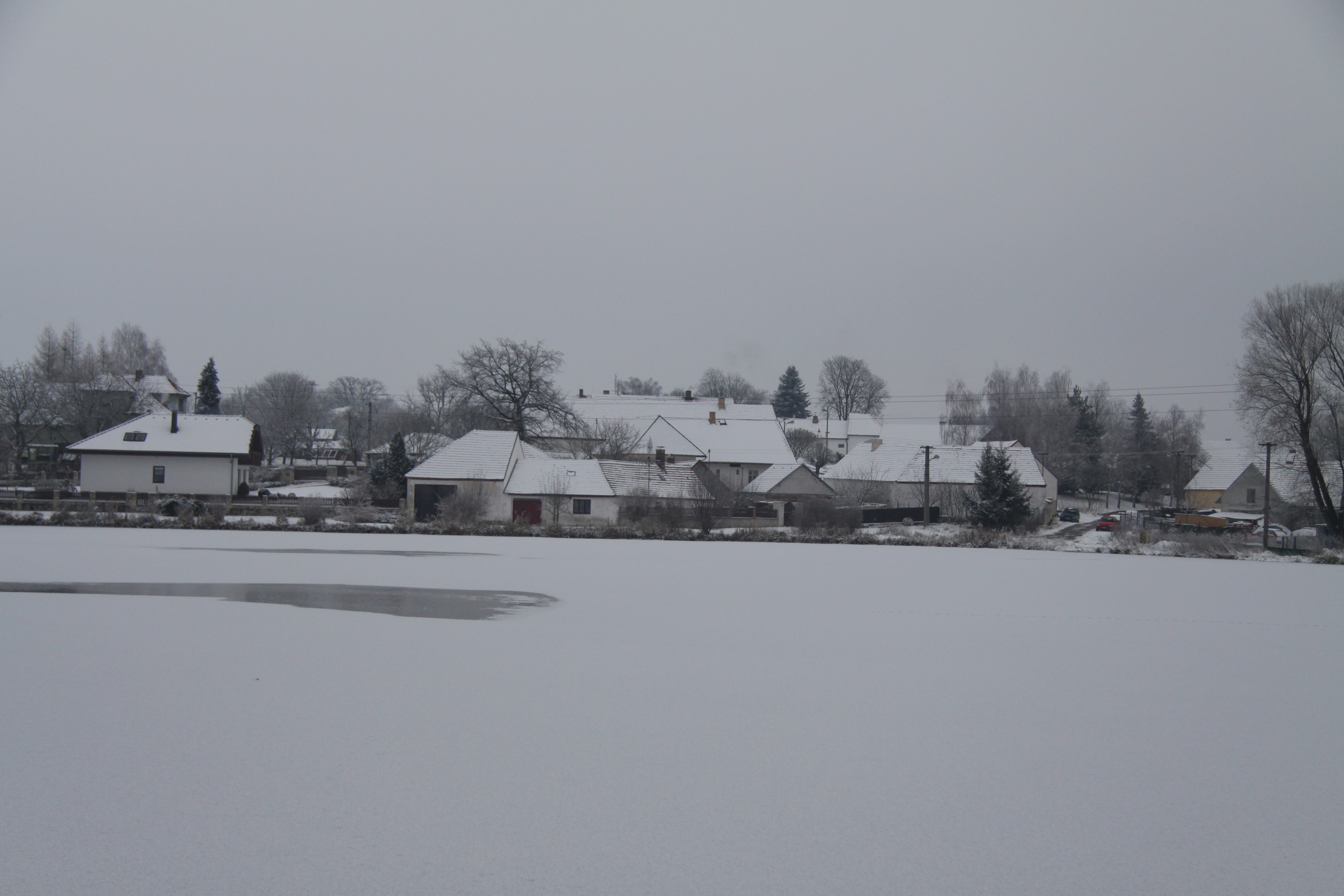
- View from the west

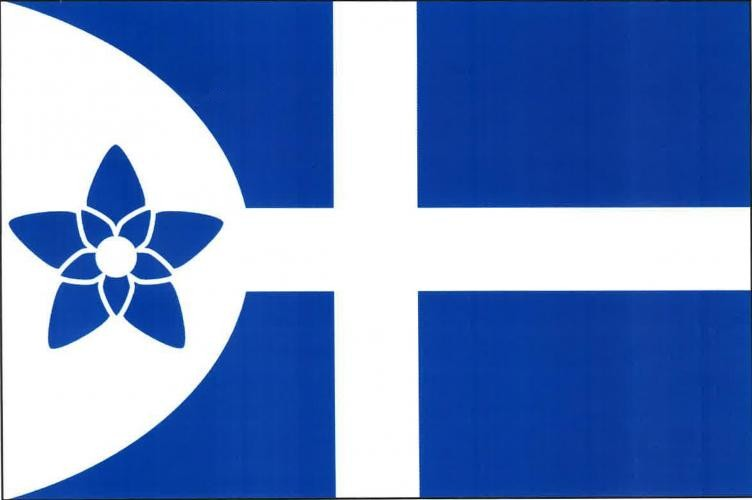
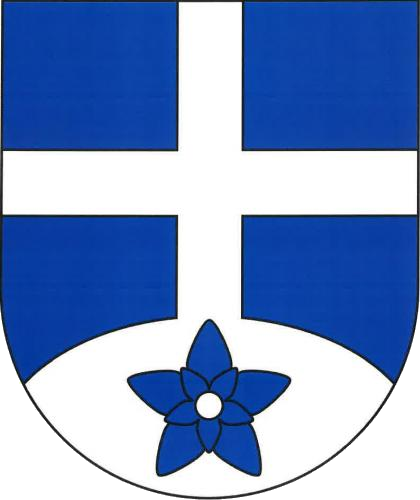
- Flag Coat of arms

- Location in the Czech Republic
- Coordinates: 49°17′11″N 13°57′14″E
- Country: Czech Republic
- Region: South Bohemian
- District: Strakonice
- First mentioned: 1319

Area
  - Total: 4.34 km^{2} (1.68 sq mi)
- Elevation: 423 m (1,388 ft)

Population (2026-01-01)
  - Total: 247
  - Density: 56.9/km^{2} (147/sq mi)
- Time zone: UTC+1 (CET)
  - Summer (DST): UTC+2 (CEST)
- Postal code: 386 01
- Website: www.obec-rovna.cz

Rovná is a municipality and village in Strakonice District in the South Bohemian Region of the Czech Republic. It has about 200 inhabitants.

Rovná lies approximately 5 kilometres (3 mi) north-east of Strakonice, 52 km (32 mi) north-west of České Budějovice, and 95 km (59 mi) south of Prague.

== Demographics ==
Historical population
Year	Pop.	±%
1869	404	—
1880	446	+10.4%
1890	376	−15.7%
1900	361	−4.0%
1910	333	−7.8%
1921	328	−1.5%
1930	364	+11.0%
1950	305	−16.2%
1961	300	−1.6%
1970	240	−20.0%
1980	258	+7.5%
1991	268	+3.9%
2001	251	−6.3%
2011	224	−10.8%
2021	227	+1.3%
Source: Censuses
