= Vučipolje, Posušje =

Vučipolje
- Village
- Location within Bosnia and Herzegovina
- Coordinates: 43°31′50″N 17°18′31″E
- Country: Bosnia and Herzegovina
- Entity: Federation of Bosnia and Herzegovina
- Canton: West Herzegovina Canton
- Municipality: Posušje

Area
  - Total: 24.31 km^{2} (9.39 sq mi)

Population (2013)
  - Total: 10
  - Density: 0.41/km^{2} (1.1/sq mi)
- Time zone: UTC+1 (CET)
  - Summer (DST): UTC+2 (CEST)

Vučipolje is a village in the municipality of Posušje in West Herzegovina Canton, the Federation of Bosnia and Herzegovina, Bosnia and Herzegovina.

== Demographics ==
According to the 2013 census, its population was 10, all Croats.

== Bibliography ==
- Ethnicity/National Affiliation, Religion and Mother Tongue (PDF). Sarajevo: Agency for Statistics of Bosnia and Herzegovina. 2019.
