= Vedro Polje, Bugojno =

Vedro Polje
- Village
- Location within Bosnia and Herzegovina
- Country: Bosnia and Herzegovina
- Entity: Federation of Bosnia and Herzegovina
- Canton: Central Bosnia
- Municipality: Bugojno

Area
  - Total: 0.17 sq mi (0.45 km^{2})

Population (2013)
  - Total: 198
  - Density: 1,100/sq mi (440/km^{2})
- Time zone: UTC+1 (CET)
  - Summer (DST): UTC+2 (CEST)

Vedro Polje is a village in the municipality of Bugojno, Bosnia and Herzegovina.

== Demographics ==
According to the 2013 census, its population was 198.

Ethnicity in 2013
Ethnicity	Number	Percentage
Bosniaks	176	88.9%
Croats	14	7.1%
Serbs	8	4.0%
Total	198	100%
