= Medini (Bugojno) =

Medini Медини
- Village
- Location within Bosnia and Herzegovina
- Coordinates: 44°08′N 17°31′E
- Country: Bosnia and Herzegovina
- Entity: Federation of Bosnia and Herzegovina
- Canton: Central Bosnia
- Municipality: Bugojno

Area
  - Total: 0.52 sq mi (1.34 km^{2})

Population (2013)
  - Total: 0
  - Density: 0.0/sq mi (0.0/km^{2})
- Time zone: UTC+1 (CET)
  - Summer (DST): UTC+2 (CEST)

Medini (Serbian: Медини) is an abandoned village in the municipality of Bugojno, Bosnia and Herzegovina.

== Demographics ==
According to the 2013 census, its population was 0, down from 204 in 1991.
