= Humac, Bugojno =

Humac Хумац
- Village
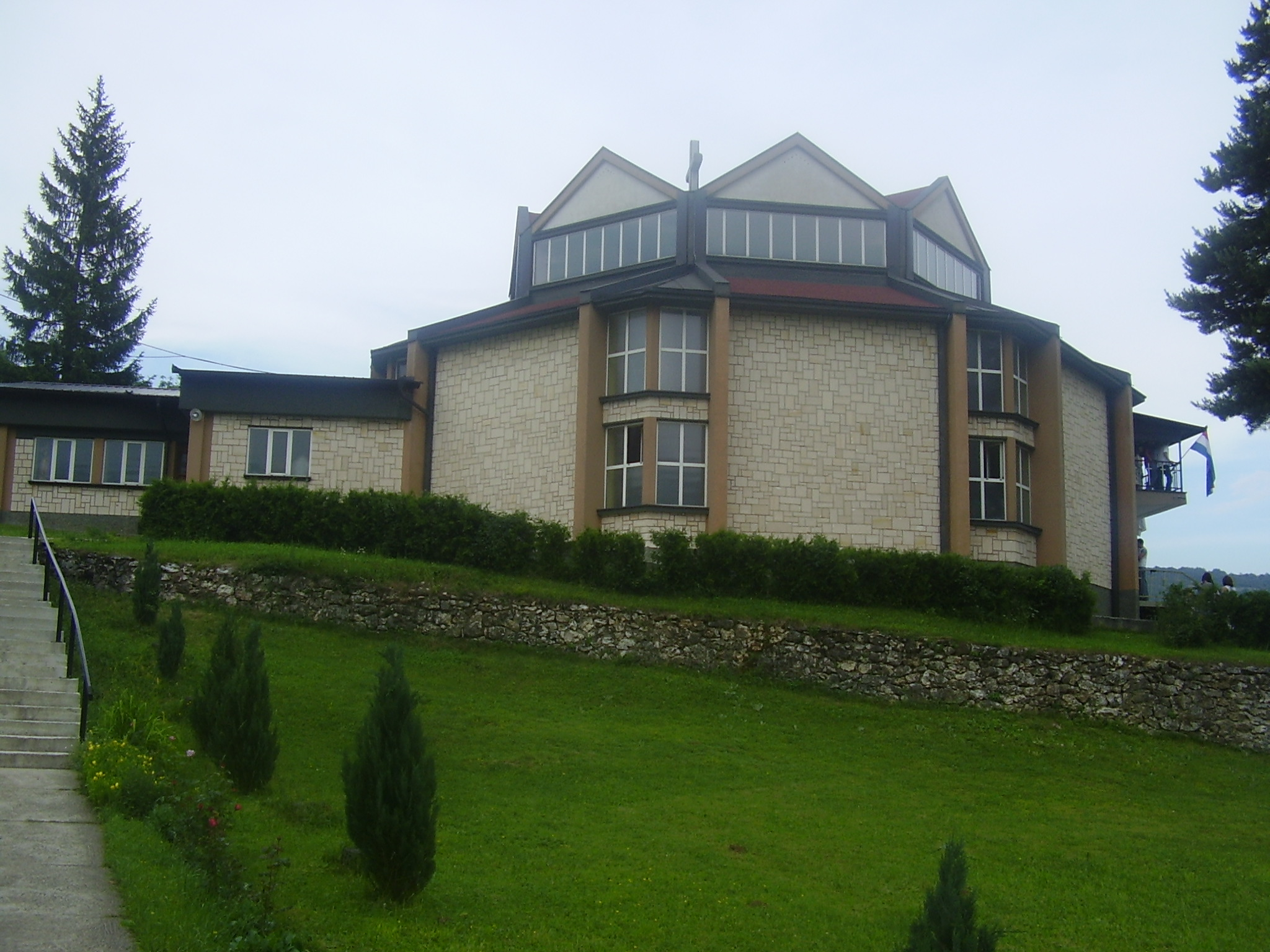
- Humac church

- Location within Bosnia and Herzegovina
- Coordinates: 43°59′33″N 17°29′41″E
- Country: Bosnia and Herzegovina
- Entity: Federation of Bosnia and Herzegovina
- Canton: Central Bosnia
- Municipality: Bugojno

Area
  - Total: 0.63 sq mi (1.63 km^{2})

Population (2013)
  - Total: 54
  - Density: 86/sq mi (33/km^{2})
- Time zone: UTC+1 (CET)
  - Summer (DST): UTC+2 (CEST)

Humac (Serbian: Хумац) is a village in the municipality of Bugojno, Bosnia and Herzegovina.

== Demographics ==
According to the 2013 census, its population was 54.

Ethnicity in 2013
Ethnicity	Number	Percentage
Croats	53	98.1%
other/undeclared	1	1.9%
Total	54	100%
