= Mračaj (Bugojno) =

Mračaj Мрачај
- Village
- Location within Bosnia and Herzegovina
- Country: Bosnia and Herzegovina
- Entity: Federation of Bosnia and Herzegovina
- Canton: Central Bosnia
- Municipality: Bugojno

Area
  - Total: 7.21 sq mi (18.68 km^{2})

Population (2013)
  - Total: 0
  - Density: 0.0/sq mi (0.0/km^{2})
- Time zone: UTC+1 (CET)
  - Summer (DST): UTC+2 (CEST)

Mračaj (Serbian: Мрачај) is a village in the municipality of Bugojno, Bosnia and Herzegovina.

The village has a population of 0 people.

== Demographics ==
According to the 2013 census, its population was nil, down from 35 in 1991.
