= Vučipolje (Bugojno) =

- Village
- Location within Bosnia and Herzegovina
- Country: Bosnia and Herzegovina
- Entity: Federation of Bosnia and Herzegovina
- Canton: Central Bosnia
- Municipality: Bugojno

Area
  - Total: 1.59 sq mi (4.11 km^{2})

Population (2013)
  - Total: 999
  - Density: 630/sq mi (243/km^{2})
- Time zone: UTC+1 (CET)
  - Summer (DST): UTC+2 (CEST)

Vučipolje is a village in the municipality of Bugojno, Bosnia and Herzegovina.

== Demographics ==
According to the 2013 census, its population was 999.

Ethnicity in 2013
Ethnicity	Number	Percentage
Bosniaks	564	56.5%
Croats	422	42.2%
Serbs	1	0.1%
other/undeclared	12	1.2%
Total	999	100%
