= Mračaj, Žepče =

Mračaj
- Village
- Location within Bosnia and Herzegovina
- Coordinates: 44.3543121°N 18.0109326°E
- Country: Bosnia and Herzegovina
- Entity: Federation of Bosnia and Herzegovina
- Canton: Zenica-Doboj
- Municipality: Žepče

Area
  - Total: 8.30 sq mi (21.50 km^{2})

Population (2013)
  - Total: 562
  - Density: 67.7/sq mi (26.1/km^{2})
- Time zone: UTC+1 (CET)
  - Summer (DST): UTC+2 (CEST)

Mračaj is a village in the municipality of Žepče, Bosnia and Herzegovina.

== Demographics ==
According to the 2013 census, its population was 562.

Ethnicity in 2013
Ethnicity	Number	Percentage
Bosniaks	560	99.6%
other/undeclared	2	0.4%
Total	562	100%
