= Rovná (Pelhřimov District) =

- Municipality
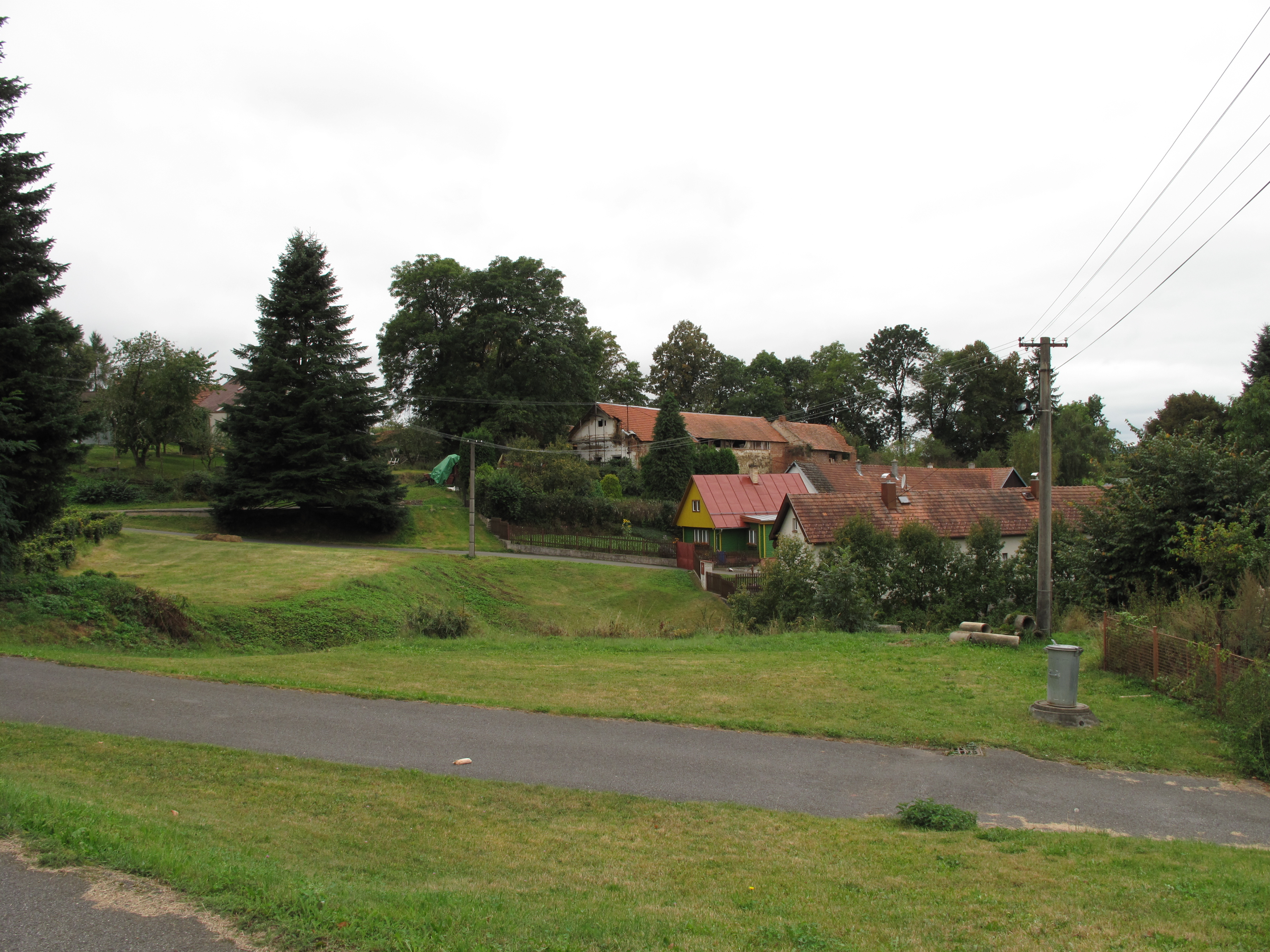
- Centre of Rovná

- Location in the Czech Republic
- Coordinates: 49°30′37″N 15°7′46″E
- Country: Czech Republic
- Region: Vysočina
- District: Pelhřimov
- First mentioned: 1352

Area
  - Total: 4.31 km^{2} (1.66 sq mi)
- Elevation: 495 m (1,624 ft)

Population (2026-01-01)
  - Total: 60
  - Density: 14/km^{2} (36/sq mi)
- Time zone: UTC+1 (CET)
  - Summer (DST): UTC+2 (CEST)
- Postal code: 395 01
- Website: www.obecrovna.cz

Rovná is a municipality and village in Pelhřimov District in the Vysočina Region of the Czech Republic. It has about 60 inhabitants.

Rovná lies approximately 11 kilometres (7 mi) north-west of Pelhřimov, 36 km (22 mi) west of Jihlava, and 82 km (51 mi) south-east of Prague.

== Demographics ==
Historical population
Year	Pop.	±%
1869	258	—
1880	276	+7.0%
1890	209	−24.3%
1900	194	−7.2%
1910	232	+19.6%
1921	247	+6.5%
1930	216	−12.6%
1950	150	−30.6%
1961	148	−1.3%
1970	126	−14.9%
1980	96	−23.8%
1991	70	−27.1%
2001	72	+2.9%
2011	55	−23.6%
2021	56	+1.8%
Source: Censuses
