= Vrpeć =

- Village
- Location within Bosnia and Herzegovina
- Coordinates: 44°02′N 17°26′E
- Country: Bosnia and Herzegovina
- Entity: Federation of Bosnia and Herzegovina
- Canton: Central Bosnia
- Municipality: Bugojno

Area
  - Total: 9.00 sq mi (23.31 km^{2})

Population (2013)
  - Total: 298
  - Density: 33.1/sq mi (12.8/km^{2})
- Time zone: UTC+1 (CET)
  - Summer (DST): UTC+2 (CEST)

Vrpeć is a village in the municipality of Bugojno, Bosnia and Herzegovina.

== Demographics ==
According to the 2013 census, its population was 298.

Ethnicity in 2013
| Ethnicity | Number | Percentage |
|---|---|---|
| Bosniaks | 269 | 90.3% |
| Croats | 28 | 9.4% |
| other/undeclared | 1 | 0.3% |
| Total | 298 | 100% |
