= Crniče =

Village in Bosnia and Herzegovina

Crniče Црниче
- Village
- Location within Bosnia and Herzegovina
- Coordinates: 44°02′N 17°27′E
- Country: Bosnia and Herzegovina
- Entity: Federation of Bosnia and Herzegovina
- Canton: Central Bosnia
- Municipality: Bugojno

Area
  - Total: 1.71 sq mi (4.44 km^{2})

Population (2013)
  - Total: 223
  - Density: 130/sq mi (50.2/km^{2})
- Time zone: UTC+1 (CET)
  - Summer (DST): UTC+2 (CEST)

Crniče (Serbian: Црниче) is a village in Bosnia and Herzegovina, located in the municipality of Bugojno.

== Demographics ==
According to the 2013 census, its population was 223.

Ethnicity in 2013
Ethnicity	Number	Percentage
Croats	158	70.9%
Bosniaks	64	28.7%
other/undeclared	1	0.4%
Total	223	100%
