= Vesela, Bugojno =

Vesela
- Village
- Location within Bosnia and Herzegovina
- Coordinates: 44°02′N 17°25′E
- Country: Bosnia and Herzegovina
- Entity: Federation of Bosnia and Herzegovina
- Canton: Central Bosnia
- Municipality: Bugojno

Area
  - Total: 6.31 sq mi (16.35 km^{2})

Population (2013)
  - Total: 1,264
  - Density: 200.2/sq mi (77.31/km^{2})
- Time zone: UTC+1 (CET)
  - Summer (DST): UTC+2 (CEST)

Vesela is a village in the municipality of Bugojno, Bosnia and Herzegovina.

== Demographics ==
According to the 2013 census, its population was 1,264.

Ethnicity in 2013
Ethnicity	Number	Percentage
Bosniaks	1,153	91.2%
Croats	74	5.9%
other/undeclared	37	2.9%
Total	1,264	100%
