= Zlokuće (Bugojno) =

Zlokuće Злокуће
- Village
- Location within Bosnia and Herzegovina
- Coordinates: 44°03′33″N 17°33′46″E
- Country: Bosnia and Herzegovina
- Entity: Federation of Bosnia and Herzegovina
- Canton: Central Bosnia
- Municipality: Bugojno

Area
  - Total: 1.80 sq mi (4.65 km^{2})

Population (2013)
  - Total: 15
  - Density: 8.4/sq mi (3.2/km^{2})
- Time zone: UTC+1 (CET)
  - Summer (DST): UTC+2 (CEST)

Zlokuće (Serbian: Злокуће) is a village in the municipality of Bugojno, Bosnia and Herzegovina.

== Demographics ==
According to the 2013 census, its population was 15, all Bosniaks.
