= Vrbanja (Bugojno) =

Vrbanja Врбања
- Village
- Location within Bosnia and Herzegovina
- Country: Bosnia and Herzegovina
- Entity: Federation of Bosnia and Herzegovina
- Canton: Central Bosnia
- Municipality: Bugojno

Area
  - Total: 0.42 sq mi (1.09 km^{2})

Population (2013)
  - Total: 496
  - Density: 1,180/sq mi (455/km^{2})
- Time zone: UTC+1 (CET)
  - Summer (DST): UTC+2 (CEST)

Vrbanja (Serbian: Врбања) is a village in the municipality of Bugojno, Bosnia and Herzegovina.

== Demographics ==
According to the 2013 census, its population was 496.

Ethnicity in 2013
Ethnicity	Number	Percentage
Bosniaks	371	74.8%
Croats	120	24.2%
other/undeclared	5	1.0%
Total	496	100%
