= Bugojno =

- Town and municipality
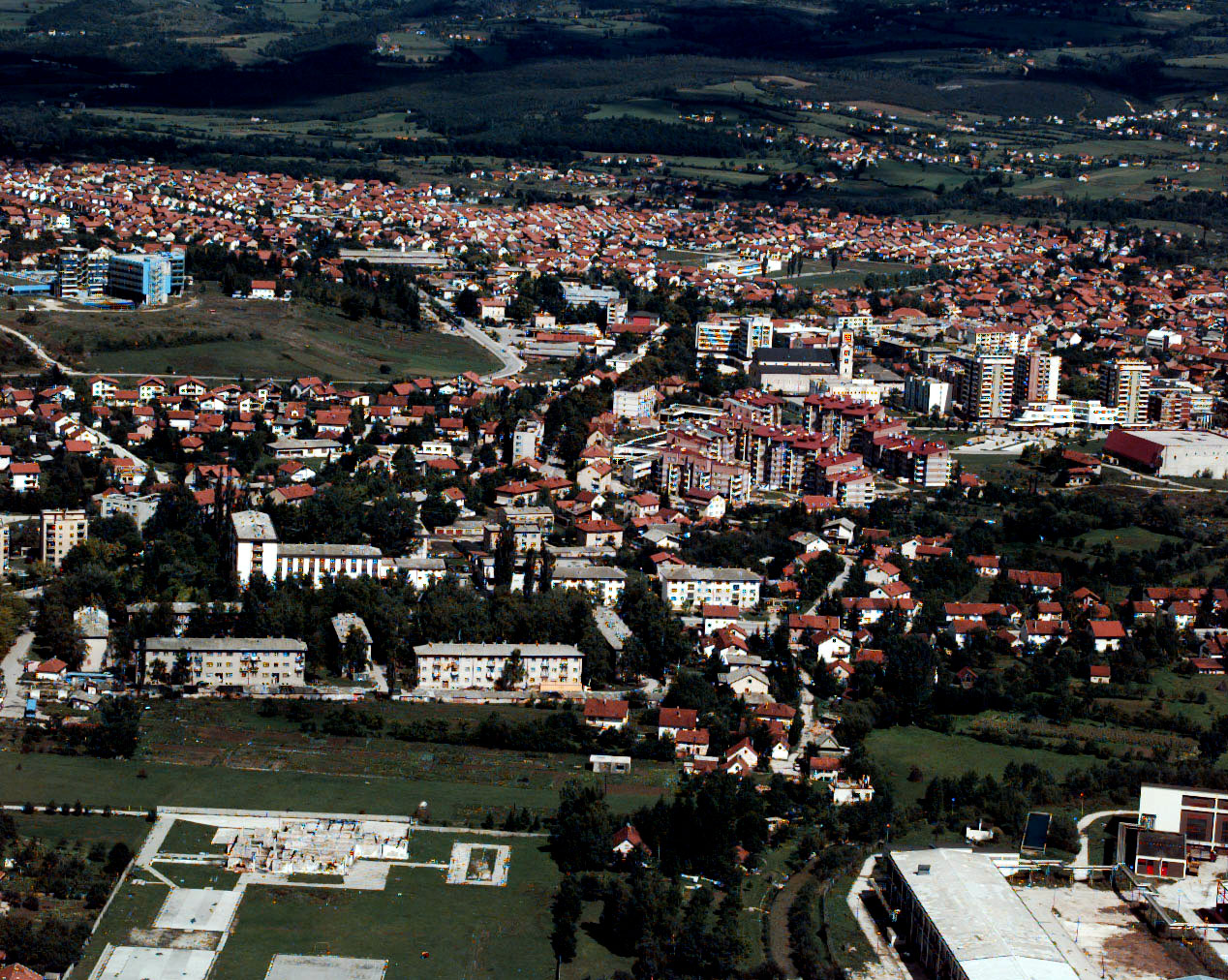
- Panorama of Bugojno

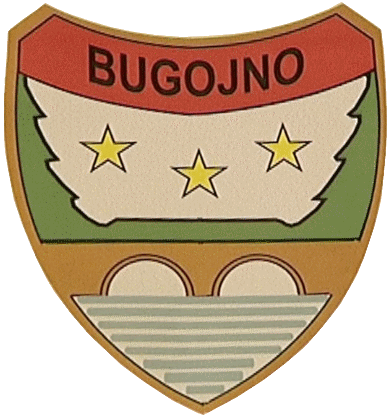
- Coat of arms

- Location of Bugojno
- Coordinates: 44°03′N 17°27′E
- Country: Bosnia and Herzegovina
- Entity: Federation of Bosnia and Herzegovina
- Canton: Central Bosnia

Government
  - Municipal mayor: Edin Mašić (SDP BiH)

Area
  - Municipality: 360.83 km^{2} (139.32 sq mi)

Population (2013)
  - Municipality: 54,531
  - Density: 96/km^{2} (250/sq mi)
  - Urban: 36,750
- Time zone: UTC+1 (CET)
  - Summer (DST): UTC+2 (CEST)
- Postal code: 70230
- Area code: +387 30
- Website: www.opcina-bugojno.ba (in Bosnian)

Bugojno (Serbian Cyrillic: Бугојно) is a town and municipality in the Central Bosnia Canton of the Federation of Bosnia and Herzegovina, an entity of Bosnia and Herzegovina. It is situated on the river Vrbas, 130 km (81 mi) to the northwest of Sarajevo. According to the 2013 census, the town has a population of 15,555 inhabitants, with 31,470 inhabitants in the municipality.

To the west towards Kupres is a region called Koprivnica. This enormous forest was once one of President Tito's favorite hunting spots. The uninhabited dense forest has created a sanctuary for wild animals. Hunting associations are very active in this region and there are many mountain and hunting lodges dotting the forest. Duboka Valley (lit. "deep valley") is a designated hunting area covered by thick spruce. Kalin Mountain is a popular weekend area for hikers and nature lovers.

== History ==
When the German and Italian Zones of Influence were revised on 24 June 1942, Bugojno fell in Zone III, administered civilly by Croatia and militarily by Croatia and Germany.

== Geography ==
The municipality has an average elevation of 570 metres above sea level. Much of its 366 km sq. is forested. The terrain is mountainous with several prominent features. Stožer (1,662 m), Kalin (1,530 m) and Rudina (1,385 m) are the tallest mountains in Bugojno.

== Demographics ==
The town and municipality is inhabited by a Bosniak majority. The town, prior to the war, was multi-ethnic, with virtually identical numbers of Croats, Bosniaks and Serbs. Today, only 325 Serbs live in the town, with 376 in the municipality. As of 2002, at least 2,147 former Serbian residents were living as refugees in Serbia itself. The number of Croats in the municipality has gone down from 16,031 to 5,767 (2013 census).

=== Town ===
In 1991 town of Bugojno had a population of 22,641 including;

- Bosniaks (6,878)
- Croats (6,836)
- Serbs (6,809)
- Yugoslavs (1,449)
- and 667 others

=== Municipality ===
Ethnic Composition
Year	Serbs	%	Bosniaks	%	Croats	%	Yugoslavs	%	Others	%	Total
1961	5,212	21.61%	7,194	29.83%	9,682	40.15%	1,871	7.76%	155	0.64%	24,114
1971	6,295	19.76%	13,050	40.96%	12.040	37.79%	197	0.61%	274	0.88%	31,856
1981	7,458	18.65%	16,214	40.56%	14,187	35.49%	1,731	4.33%	379	0.97%	39,969
1991	8,673	18.50%	19,697	42.01%	16,031	34.19%	1,561	3.33%	927	1.98%	46,889
2013	376	01.19%	24,650	78.32%	5,767	18.32%	0	0%	493	1.56%	31,470

The list of settlements in the municipality is:

- Alibegovići
- Barbarići
- Bašići
- Bevrnjići
- Brda
- Bristovi
- Brižina
- Bugojno
- Čardaci
- Čavići
- Ceribašići
- Crniče
- Donji Boganovci
- Drvetine
- Garačići
- Glavice
- Golo Brdo
- Gornji Boganovci
- Goruša
- Gračanica
- Gredine
- Grgići
- Hapstići
- Harambašići
- Hum
- Humac
- Ivica
- Jagodići
- Jazvenik
- Kadirovina
- Kandija
- Karadže
- Kopčić
- Kordići
- Kotezi
- Kula
- Kunovci
- Kutlići
- Lenđerovina
- Ljubnić
- Lug
- Maslići
- Medini
- Milanovići
- Mračaj
- Nuhići
- Odžak
- Okolište
- Pavice
- Pirići
- Planinica
- Podripci
- Poriče
- Potočani
- Prijaci
- Rosulje
- Rovna
- Sabljari
- Seferovići
- Servani
- Šići
- Skrte
- Stojići
- Stolac
- Šušljici
- Trge
- Udurlije
- Vedro Polje
- Vesela
- Vileši
- Vrbanja
- Vrpeć
- Vučipolje
- Zanesovići
- Ždralovići
- Zlokuće
- Zlavast

== Climate ==
The climate in Bugojno is continental. Summers are usually warm and dry, with average temperatures that can reach or exceed 30 °C. Sunny days are common, but occasional short showers can occur, especially in late summer. Nights are relatively cool, providing relief from the daytime heat. Winters are cold and snowy. Temperatures often drop below 0 °C, and the snow cover remains on the ground for most of the winter. Frost is common, which can cause ice and slippery conditions on roads and sidewalks. Climate change increasingly affects this region, resulting in variations in precipitation frequency and intensity, as well as temperature extremes. The hottest day on record was August 24, 2007, at 39.3 °C, while the coldest was February 17, 1956, at −31.2 °C. The highest annual precipitation was recorded in 1895 at 1117 mm, while the lowest was in 2011 at 522 mm.

Climate data for Bugojno (1991–2020, extremes (1956, 1961-2020)
Month	Jan	Feb	Mar	Apr	May	Jun	Jul	Aug	Sep	Oct	Nov	Dec	Year
Record high °C (°F)	17.2 (63.0)	23.4 (74.1)	25.0 (77.0)	29.3 (84.7)	33.1 (91.6)	37.0 (98.6)	39.0 (102.2)	39.3 (102.7)	37.2 (99.0)	29.0 (84.2)	24.0 (75.2)	19.4 (66.9)	39.3 (102.7)
Mean daily maximum °C (°F)	4.5 (40.1)	7.1 (44.8)	11.7 (53.1)	16.5 (61.7)	20.9 (69.6)	25.1 (77.2)	27.8 (82.0)	28.0 (82.4)	22.3 (72.1)	17.5 (63.5)	10.9 (51.6)	4.7 (40.5)	16.4 (61.5)
Daily mean °C (°F)	−0.1 (31.8)	1.5 (34.7)	5.6 (42.1)	10.0 (50.0)	14.4 (57.9)	18.2 (64.8)	20.0 (68.0)	19.7 (67.5)	14.8 (58.6)	10.5 (50.9)	5.6 (42.1)	0.7 (33.3)	10.1 (50.2)
Mean daily minimum °C (°F)	−4.0 (24.8)	−3.0 (26.6)	0.2 (32.4)	3.8 (38.8)	7.1 (44.8)	10.6 (51.1)	12.2 (54.0)	12.2 (54.0)	8.8 (47.8)	5.3 (41.5)	1.5 (34.7)	−2.5 (27.5)	4.4 (39.9)
Record low °C (°F)	−29.4 (−20.9)	−31.2 (−24.2)	−20.4 (−4.7)	−7.5 (18.5)	−1.6 (29.1)	−1.0 (30.2)	2.7 (36.9)	1.0 (33.8)	−5.7 (21.7)	−7.8 (18.0)	−20.0 (−4.0)	−24.4 (−11.9)	−31.2 (−24.2)
Average precipitation mm (inches)	54.1 (2.13)	48.6 (1.91)	52.2 (2.06)	75.0 (2.95)	76.1 (3.00)	81.0 (3.19)	71.7 (2.82)	61.0 (2.40)	86.9 (3.42)	74.4 (2.93)	85.1 (3.35)	73.0 (2.87)	839.7 (33.06)
Average precipitation days (≥ 1 mm)	8.6	8.2	8.9	10.0	10.4	9.1	8.0	6.6	8.1	8.6	9.4	9.8	105.7
Average snowy days (≥ 1.0 cm)	17.3	13.4	6.2	0.9	0.0	0.0	0.0	0.0	0.0	0.1	4.8	15.6	58.2
Average relative humidity (%)	80.1	75.4	71.1	69.2	69.6	69.2	68.2	70.4	75.6	77.4	80.3	82.1	74.1
Mean monthly sunshine hours	72.0	94.9	136.1	156.8	183.3	214.5	246.6	236.3	155.9	125.0	72.5	57.5	1,751.4
Source: Meteorological Institute of Bosnia and Herzegovina, NOAA(extremes for 1991-2020) (Note: Climate normals for 1991-2020 period can be found in the NOAA reference)

== Economy ==
Bugojno was once a major industrial centre in Bosnia and Herzegovina. In 1981, Bugojno's GDP per capita was 98% of the Yugoslav average. However, hardships caused by the war in Bosnia and Herzegovina took a toll on the industry and overall economy of Bugojno. Apart from industry, forestry has been an important contributor to the local economy and continues to be. In recent years, agriculture has grown in sustaining the Bugojno's economy as many people are investing in land and agronomy.

== Sports ==
The local chapter of the HPS is HPD "Stožer", founded on 19 October 1935, and with 27 members in 1936 under the Lavoslav Jerg presidency. Membership rose to 28 in 1937 and Emil Havranek was elected its president. Membership rose to 30 in 1938.

== Notable people ==
- Edin Atić (born 1997), basketball player
- Željko Bebek (born 1945), singer
- Ivona Dadic (born 1993), Austrian heptathlete, whose parents were born in Bugojno
- Zenit Đozić (born 1961), actor and humorist
- Vlatko Marković (1937–2013), football executive, former manager and footballer
- Branko Mikulić (1928–1994), Prime Minister of Yugoslavia (1986–1989), President of Organizing Committee of 1984 Winter Olympics
- Stjepan Tomas (born 1976), manager and former footballer
- Ermin Zec (born 1988), footballer

== Gallery ==
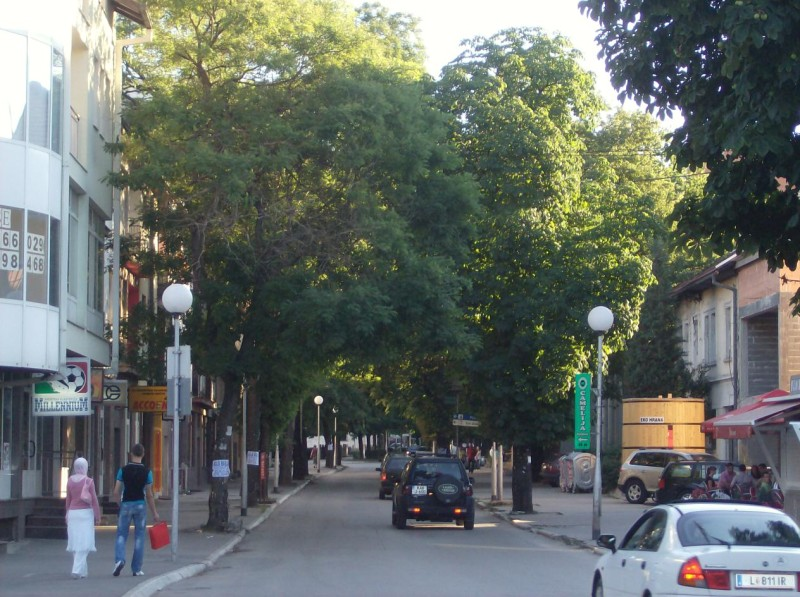
Town center

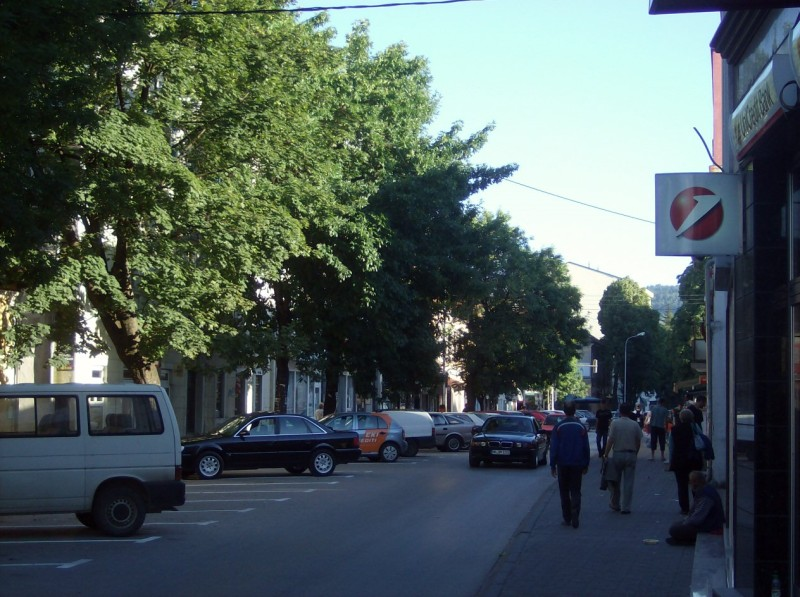
Town center

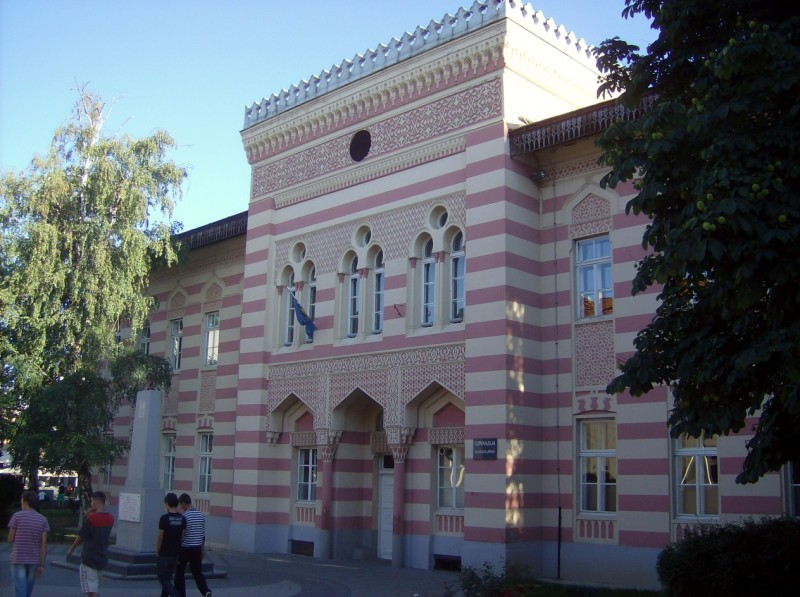
High school

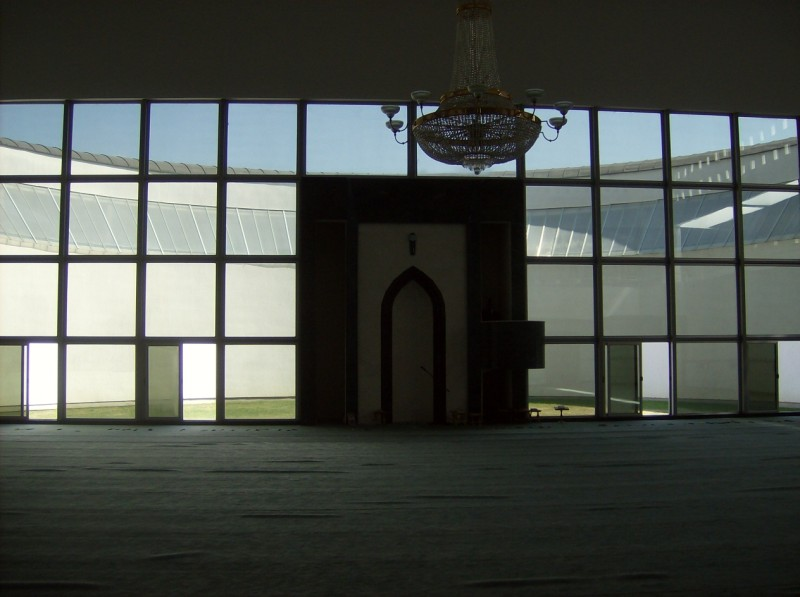
Princess Gevher mosque

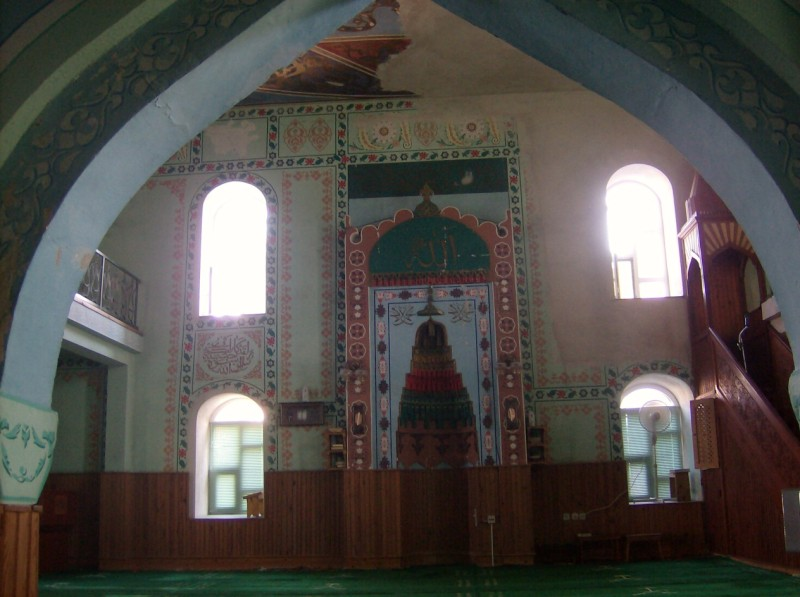
Sultan Ahmed mosque

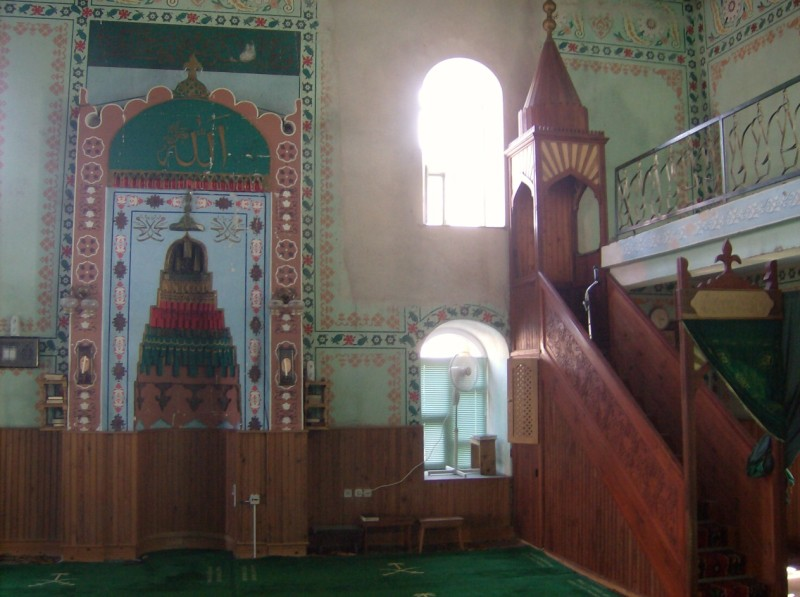
Interior of the mosque

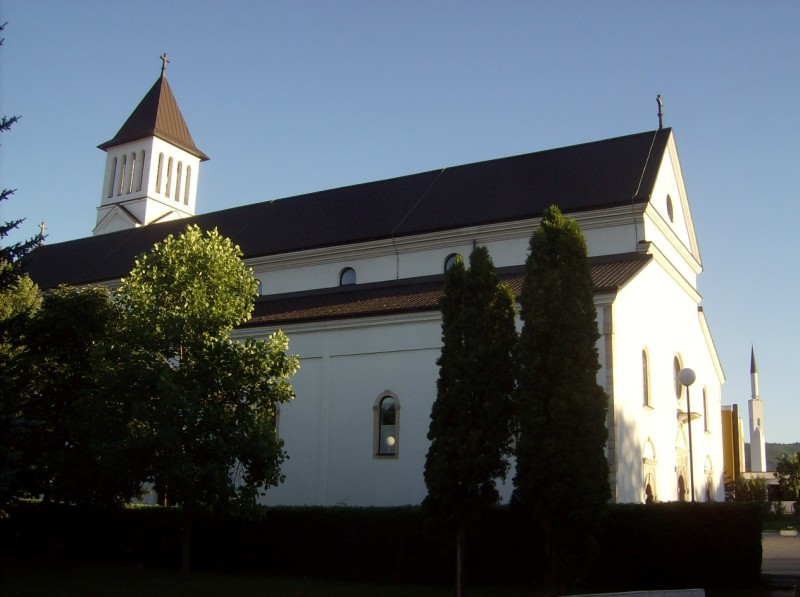
Catholic church of Saint Anthony of Padua

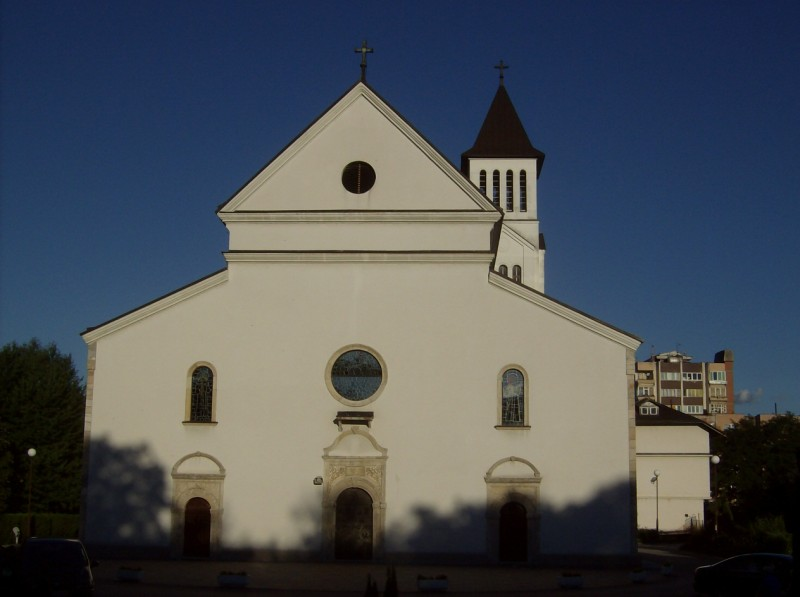
Catholic church of Saint Anthony of Padua

== Bibliography ==
- Trgo, Fabijan, ed. (1964). Zbornik dokumenata i podataka o Narodno-oslobodilačkom ratu Jugoslovenskih naroda. Vol. V, 32.
