= Goranci, Mostar =

Goranci
- Village
- Location within Bosnia and Herzegovina
- Country: Bosnia and Herzegovina
- Entity: Federation of Bosnia and Herzegovina
- Canton: Herzegovina-Neretva
- Municipality: City of Mostar

Area
  - Total: 24.73 sq mi (64.04 km^{2})

Population (2013)
  - Total: 175
  - Density: 7.08/sq mi (2.73/km^{2})
- Time zone: UTC+1 (CET)
  - Summer (DST): UTC+2 (CEST)

Goranci is the village in Bosnia and Herzegovina, near Mostar, part of Mostar municipality.

The name Goranci does not have a direct link to the ethnic group Goranci in Serbia.

Settlements around Goranci are Bogodol, Crnač, Drežnica, Gradac, Knešpolje, Mostar, Polog, Raška Gora, Široki Brijeg, Vrdi, Grabova Draga and Sovići.

== Demographics ==
In 1991 the village had 509 people:

- Croats - 472 (92.73%)
- Serbs - 36 (7.07%)
- Other - 1 (0.20%)

According to the 2013 census, its population was 175, all Croats.
