= Mostarsko Blato =

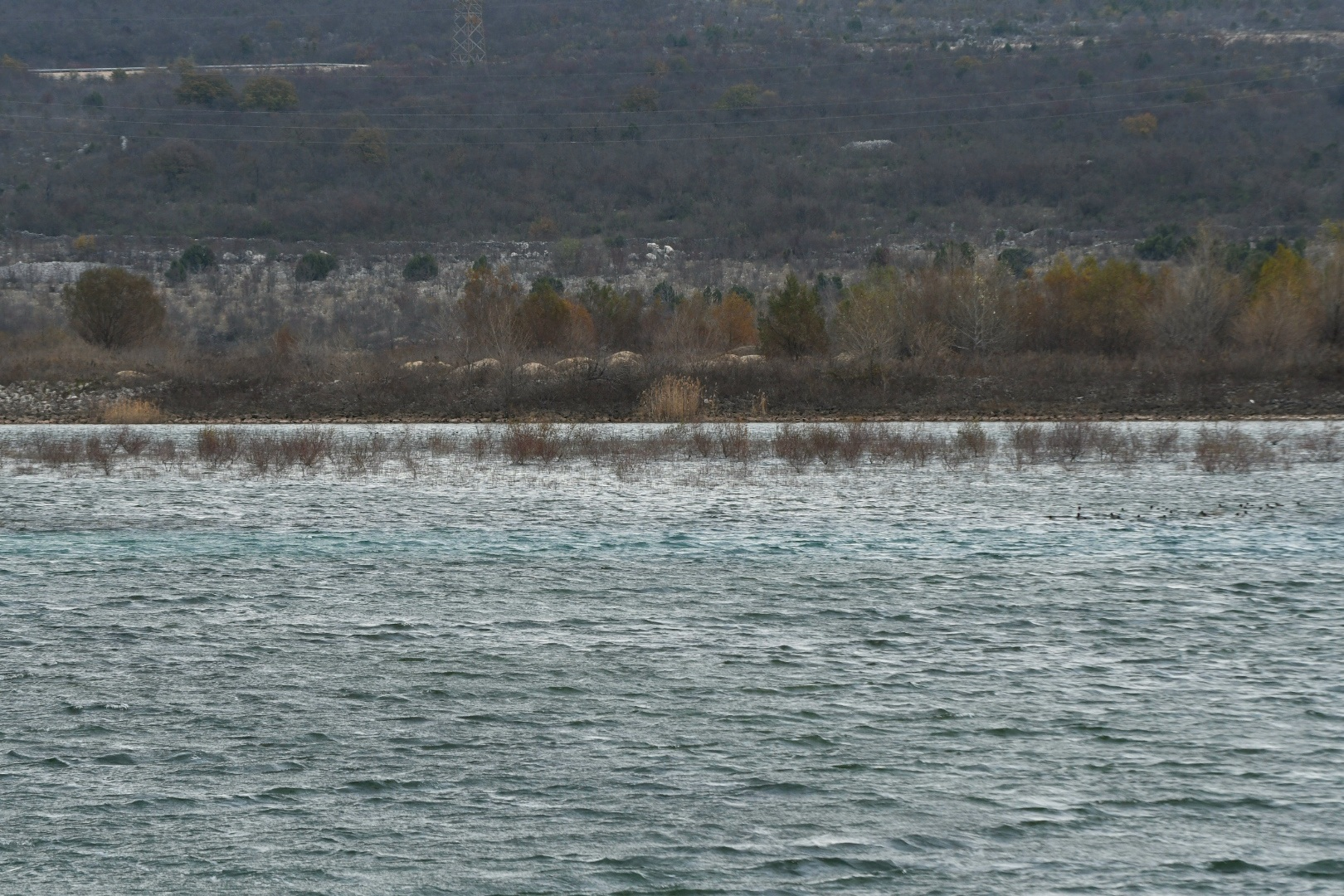
- Mostarsko Blato

- Location within Bosnia and Herzegovina
- Interactive map of Mostarsko Blato
- Coordinates: 43.312°N 17.733°E
- Type: Wetland
- River sources: Lištica
- Basin countries: Bosnia and Herzegovina

Mostarsko Blato is a karst field and a seasonal karstic wetland (blato), forming as waters are collecting in a temporary karstic lake during a springtime. Blato is situated in the area of Široki Brijeg and Mostar, in Bosnia and Herzegovina. On the edge of the field are numerous villages and settlements.

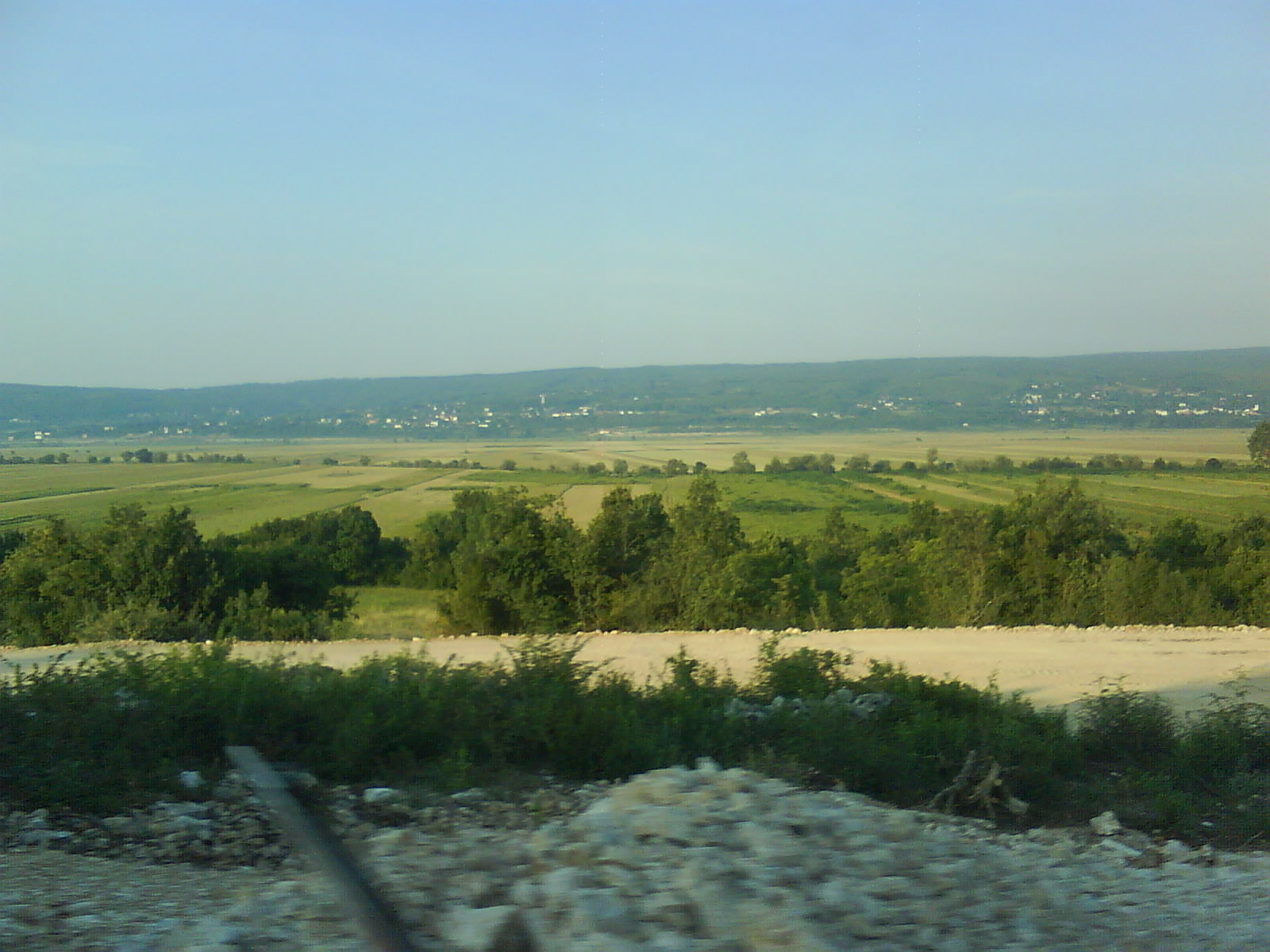
Polje where Mostarsko Blato forms in high-waters season

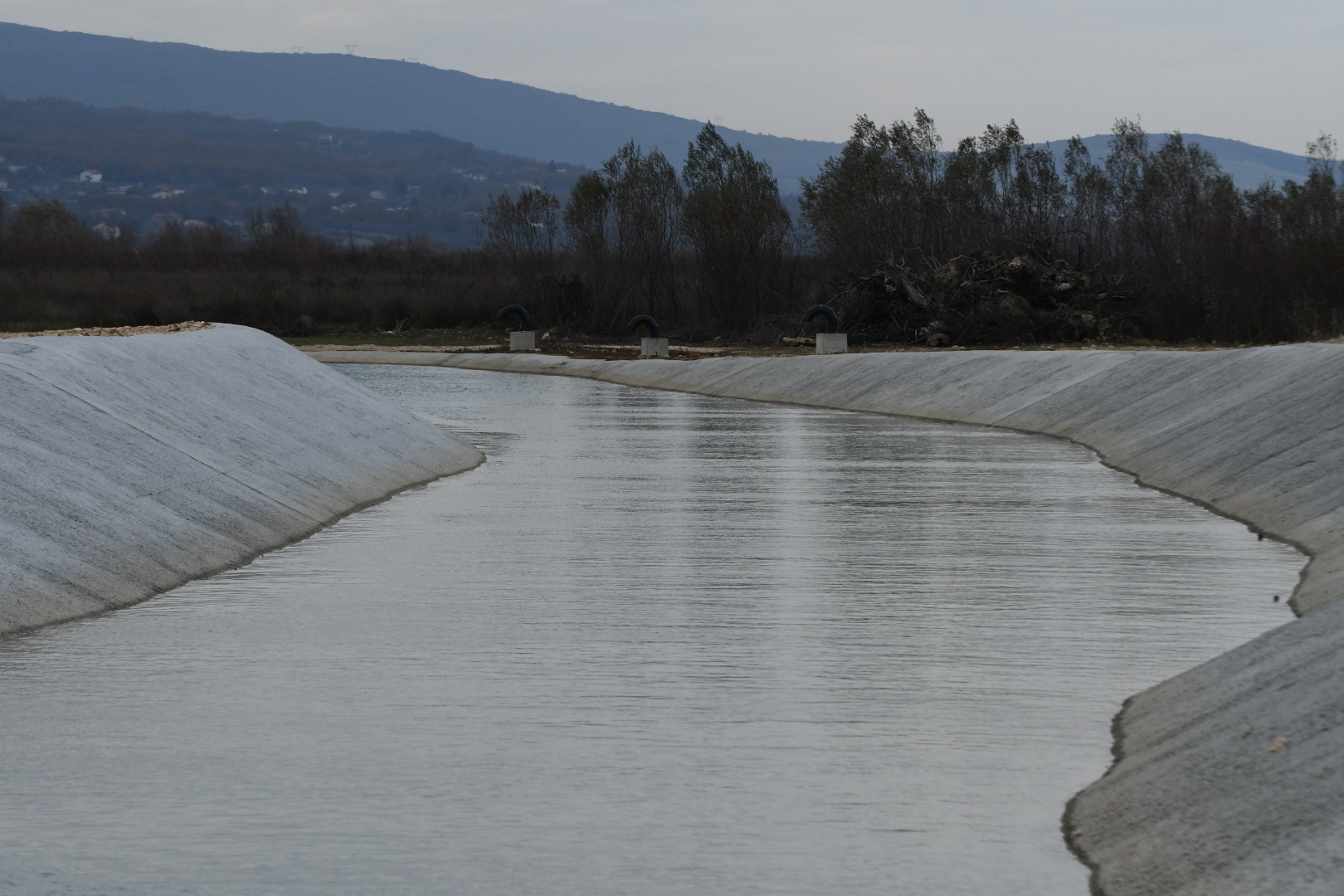
Blato's waters utilized for electricity generation at HPP Mostarsko Blato

== Geography and hydrology ==
Mostarsko Blato is a polje (karst field) and a seasonal karstic wetland, or blato in Serbo-Croatian, forming as a result of large influx of seasonal waters collecting in a temporary karstic lake during the springtime, from late winter to early summer.

It is located between the slopes of Čabulja and Polog (1138 m) in the north and the lower karst (limestone) plateau of Trtla (690 m) in the south. It runs northwest–southeast at an altitude between 220 and 245 meters above sea level. Its area is 42.56 km2, of which 38.00 km2 is exposed to seasonal floods. In the extreme southeast, there is a muddy part of the field with a zone of estavelles and ponors at the margins.

There is a double water regime in the wetland. During the rainy season from October to June, considerable amounts of water enter the polje. They flow from the surrounding slopes or emerge from karst springs and estavelles around the field, and part of the water comes through the sinking rivers Lištica and Ugrovača. This creates a lake of different size and duration. The waters from the blato and the lake eventually end up in the Neretva, via re-emerging Lištica, in part after leaving the hydrotechnical facilities of the Mostarsko Blato hydroelectric power plant, and in part by re-emerge in huge Bezdan karstic wellspring in Rodoč, gets a new name, the Jasenica.

=== Utilization ===
The region is suitable for viticulture. In the past, tobacco, corn and wheat were grown here, but now it is pastures and meadows, with immortelle farming. The field has a moderately warm humid climate with a hot summer.

In order to protect against floods and use water in the production of electricity at the beginning of the 21st century, the Mostarsko Blato hydroelectric power plant was built. For the needs of this hydroelectric power plant, 9 different facilities were built with two reservoirs created.

=== Settlements ===
On the edge of the field are the settlements: Čula, Krivodol, Miljkovići, Podgorje, Selište, Polog, Biograci, Jare, Ljuti Dolac, Uzarići, Knešpolje and Dobrić.

== Ecology ==
Flooding in karst fields plays a key but poorly understood role in the functioning and development of underground and surface karst ecosystems. The survival of numerous endemic and endangered species in karst fields and in the underground spaces connected to them is significantly threatened by natural (climatic variations or changes), but increasingly also by negative impacts caused by various human activities. In this sense, the role of engineering and agrotechnical works in reducing the duration of floods in karst fields is completely unexplored, but it is obvious that it can have significant negative consequences.

=== Prikanac steno-endemic species ===
During 2003, a steno-endemic species of ichthyofauna, i.e. a species that is found exclusively in the specific areal, in this case in Mostraski Blato, was identified. The fish called prikanac (Latin: Phoxinellus pseudalepidotus) lives up to 4 years, becomes sexually mature already in the first year of life, and spawns several times during the period of higher water level, which lasts from the end of January to the end of May. When Mostarsko Blato is not flooded, it lives in sinkholes and in dried mud. The construction of the HPP Mostarsko Blato hydroelectric power plant in 2010, and other construction works, such as road construction, illegal garbage disposal, contributed to burying of water sources and sink holes, excessive fishing and poaching, led to a dramatic decrease in the number of the population. Due to all these facts, the prikanac was included in the Red List of endangered species by the IUCN. In order to protect this important species a project was planned and implemented by the Dinarica Association with a help in financing by the CEPF. The project lasted until June 2021.

== See also ==
- Hutovo Blato
- Neretva dwarf goby
