= Gradac =

Gradac may refer to:

== Bosnia and Herzegovina ==
- Gradac, Derventa, a village in Bosnia and Herzegovina
- Gradac, Foča, a village in Bosnia and Herzegovina
- Gradac, Hadžići, a village in Bosnia and Herzegovina
- Gradac, Kakanj, a village in Bosnia and Herzegovina
- Gradac, Kiseljak, a village in Bosnia and Herzegovina
- Gradac, Ljubinje, a village in Bosnia and Herzegovina
- Gradac, Neum, a village in Bosnia and Herzegovina
- Gradac, Novo Goražde, a village in Bosnia and Herzegovina
- Gradac, Pale, a village in Bosnia and Herzegovina
- Gradac, Posušje, a village in Bosnia and Herzegovina

== Croatia ==
- Gradac, Požega-Slavonia County, a village in Croatia
- Gradac, Split-Dalmatia County, a municipality in Croatia
- Gradac, Šibenik-Knin County, a village in Croatia
- Gradac, Karlovac, a section of the city of Karlovac, Croatia

== Montenegro ==
- Gradac, Pljevlja, a village in Montenegro
- Gradac, Podgorica, a village in Podgorica municipality, Montenegro

== Serbia ==
- Gradac, a former name of the city of Čačak
- Gradac (river), a river in Serbia
- Gradac Monastery, a medieval monastery in Serbia
- Gradac, Batočina, a village in Serbia
- Gradac, Brus, a village in Serbia
- Gradac, Ivanjica, a village in Serbia
- Gradac, Raška, a village in Serbia
- Gradac, Sjenica, a village in Serbia
- Gradac, Tutin, a village in Serbia

== Slovenia ==
- Gradac, Metlika, a village in Slovenia

== See also ==
- Gradec (disambiguation)
- Donji Gradac (disambiguation)
- Gornji Gradac (disambiguation)
