= Bogodol =

- Village
- Location within Bosnia and Herzegovina
- Coordinates: 43°26′57″N 17°40′16″E
- Country: Bosnia and Herzegovina
- Entity: Federation of Bosnia and Herzegovina
- Canton: Herzegovina-Neretva
- Municipality: Mostar

Area
  - Total: 19.96 sq mi (51.69 km^{2})

Population (2013)
  - Total: 148
  - Density: 7.42/sq mi (2.86/km^{2})
- Time zone: UTC+1 (CET)
  - Summer (DST): UTC+2 (CEST)
- Postal code: 88000

Bogodol is a populated settlement in Bosnia and Herzegovina, Mostar municipality. It is located 21 km from the city of Mostar, in the Herzegovina-Neretva Canton, the Federation of Bosnia and Herzegovina.

== Geography ==
From the north, the slopes of the mountain Čabulja (Kuki, Vilinkosa, Ćavarova kosa, Plesno, Kulica, Trostruke drage). From the south the hill Bile (Grozdac, Samograd, for Krš), from the southwest the hill Voštica (the name comes from the Old Slavic river Voštok which means east). From the west of Pavlova Jela (named after the harambaša Pavle Milanović who was killed and hanged by the Turks)

On the east side is the village of Goranci, which also houses the Catholic parish church, on the west side is the village of Gornji Crnač, on the south side are the villages of Gornji Gradac and Gostuša, and on the north is the village of Gornja Drežnica.

== History ==
The Serb families Bojanić, then Ivanišević and Matković from Montenegro began to settle here at the beginning, and the Croat ones at the end of the 18th century. At the beginning of the 20th century, emigration began to Mostar, then to Bosnia, Slavonia, and further to the United States. During the Second World War, a large number of Serbs were killed by the Ustashas. After the Second World War, emigration took place: Serbs throughout Vojvodina, and Croats mostly to Slavonia and Srem.

In the late fifties, Bogodol became a victim of rural-urban migration. The elementary school built in 1950 was closed in the 1980s.

The remaining Serbs were forcibly evicted in the last Bosnian war.

== Demographics ==
According to the 2013 census, its population was 148, all Croats.

== See also ==
- Čabulja
