= Jasenica (Neretva) =

Sinking river in Bosnia and Herzegovina

- Location within Bosnia and Herzegovina

Location
- Country: Bosnia and Herzegovina

Physical characteristics
- Mouth
  - location: Neretva
  - coordinates: 43.2534°N 17.8244°E

Basin features
- Progression: Ugrovača→ Brina→ Lištica→ Jasenica→ Neretva→ Adriatic Sea

Jasenica is a sinking river in Bosnia and Herzegovina. It begins as the Ugrovača river, runs through canyon where it gets new name, the Brina, and flows into the town of Široki Brijeg. Here it connects with the Borak wellspring that rises at the base of the mountainside near Široki Brijeg, thus creating the Lištica river.

== Sinking river ==
The Lištica sinks in the area of Mostarsko Blato seasonal lake and appears as the Jasenica, in eponymous village Jasenica in Rodoč suburb of Mostar. After short course it empties into the Neretva near Ortiješ, south of Mostar.

== Water utilization ==
The river Lištica/Jasenica is listed as the second coldest river in Europe, and is prone to constant flooding mostly during winter. For the second reason waters of the Lištica is utilized with Mostarsko Blato Hydroelectric Power Station. Power station on the Lištica river/Jasenica is located in Jasenica village, Rodoč. Installed capacity of this plant is 60 MW.
