= Gornji Gradac =

Gornji Gradac may refer to the following places in Bosnia and Herzegovina:

- Gornji Gradac, Konjic
- Gornji Gradac, Široki Brijeg
