= Phoxinellus pseudalepidotus =

Conservation status
- Endangered (IUCN 3.1)

Scientific classification
- Kingdom: Animalia
- Phylum: Chordata
- Class: Actinopterygii
- Order: Cypriniformes
- Family: Leuciscidae
- Subfamily: Leuciscinae
- Genus: Phoxinellus
- Species: P. pseudalepidotus

Binomial name
- Phoxinellus pseudalepidotus Bogutskaya & Zupančič, 2003

Species of fish

Phoxinellus pseudalepidotus, the Mostar minnow, is a species of freshwater ray-finned fish belonging to the family Leuciscidae, which includes the daces, Eurasian minnows and related species. This species is found in Southeastern Europe, in the Western Balkans, where it is endemic to Bosnia-Herzegovina.

== Taxonomy ==
Phoxinellus pseudalepidotus was first formally described in 2000 by Bogutskaya and Primož Zupančič, with its type locality given as Mostarsko Blato, Hawalka, Bosnia-Herzegovina. The genus Phoxineluus is classified within the subfamily Leuciscinae of the family Leuciscidae.

== Etymology ==
Phoxinellus pseudalepidotus is the type species of the genus Phoxinellus. This name is a diminutive of Phoxinus, the genus of the "true" Eurasian minnows. Heckel may have coined this name due to the small size of P. alepidotus when compared to Cyprinus phoxinus. The specific name, pseudalepidotus, prefixes pseud-, which means "false", onto the specific name of the type species of Phoxinellus, P, alepidotus, to indicate that this species is similar but not the same as that species.

== Description ==
Phoxinellus pseudalepidotus has a broad, dark stripe running from the eye to base of the caudal fin, this sits within a pigmented area on the back and flanks. The dorsal and anal fins both have 7 1/2 branched rays. The snout is blunt and clearly rounded with a subterminal mouth. The body is largely scale-less but there are 54-77 scales in the lateral line and a few scales above and below the lateral line to the rear of the head. This species has a maximum standard length of 10.3 cm (4.1 in).

== Distribution and habitat ==
Phoxinellus pseudalepidotus is only known from the Mostarsko Blato, a polje in the Dinaric Karst region of southern Bosnia and Herzegovina, where it is found in the middle and lower reaches of the Lištica River, as well as a series of associated springs, tributaries and subsurface water bodies. The Mostar minnow occurs in shallow channels with a slow current and clear water.

== Conservation ==
Phoxinellus pseudalepidotus is classified as Endangered by the International Union for Conservation of Nature. It has a restricted range and its habitat has been altered by a hydroelectric scheme, drainage and water abstraction. Invasive non-native fish are also a threat to this species.
