= Pešes =

- Origin: Široki Brijeg, Bosnia and Herzegovina
- Genres: pop-rock
- Years active: 2008 — present
- Labels: Croatia Records
- Members: Marko Karačić; Joško Klarić; Petra Klarić; Nikola Kovačić; Matej Mikulić; Ante Zovko
- Past members: Mateja Galić; Petar Mikulić; Filip Džajkić

Pešes is a pop-rock band from Bosnia and Herzegovina, based in Široki Brijeg. The current lineup consists of Marko Karačić, Joško Klarić, Petra Brekalo, Nikola Kovačić, Matej Mikulić and Ante Zovko.

== History ==
Pešes is a band from Široki Brijeg, Bosnia and Herzegovina, formed in 2008. In 2014 the band has released its debut album, called Bajka. The band has played many important festivals, such as Ritam Evrope 2, Terraneo (along with The Prodigy and The Woods), WHF etc. They have signed with Croatian label Croatia Records.

== Members ==
=== Current members ===
- Marko Karačić - bass
- Joško Klarić - vocals
- Petra Klarić - vocals
- Nikola Kovačić - drums
- Matej Mikulić - guitar
- Ante Zovko - guitar

=== Past members ===
- Mateja Galić
- Petar Mikulić
- Filip Džajkić

== Discography ==
- Bajka (2014)
