= Kolobarića Dolac =

Village in Bosnia and Herzegovina

Coordinates: 43°23′N 17°27′E

Kolobarića Dolac is a small village in Kočerin, Široki Brijeg municipality, Bosnia and Herzegovina. The village is famous for its large veterans' homes, for veterans of the Croatian War of Independence.

Some trenches in Croatian War of Independence are

- Tulac
- Gnjilavac
- Privija
- Garišta
- Kruška
- Vučja Rupa

The village once had a population of more than 800, however today it is less than 200.

The village is also famous for the production of tobacco.
