= Polog (disambiguation) =

Polog valley is an area of north-west Macedonia.

Polog may refer to:

- Polog, Mostar, a village in Bosnia and Herzegovina
- Polog Statistical Region, a statistical region of Macedonia

== See also ==
- Eparchy of Polog and Kumanovo
- Diocese of Polog and Kumanovo
- Polog, Novaci
- Polog, Mostar
- Pollog, Glasgow
- Polo G
