= Izbično =

- Village
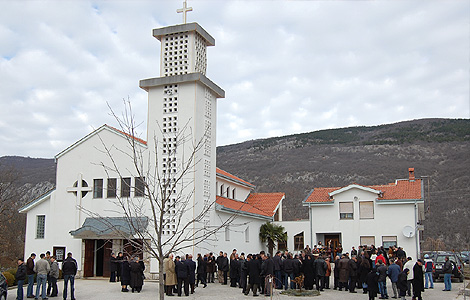
- Church of Izbično

- Location within Bosnia and Herzegovina
- Coordinates: 43°22′N 17°35′E
- Country: Bosnia and Herzegovina
- Entity: Federation of Bosnia and Herzegovina
- Canton: West Herzegovina
- Municipality: Široki Brijeg

Area
  - Total: 3.95 sq mi (10.24 km^{2})

Population (2013)
  - Total: 196
  - Density: 49.6/sq mi (19.1/km^{2})
- Time zone: UTC+1 (CET)
  - Summer (DST): UTC+2 (CEST)
- Area code: +387 39
- Website: www.izbicno.info

Izbično is a settlement in the north-west of the Široki Brijeg Municipality, below the Varda Hill.

The Župa (parish) of St. Joseph the Worker of Izbično includes Donja Britvica, Gornja Britvica and Solde hamlet, which belongs to the Donji Crnač settlement. Every year on August 16, the settlement celebrates Izbičijada, a festival which gathers inhabitants of Izbično, as well as the people who emigrated from the village, and other guests.

Five main hamlets of Izbično are: Crnjci, Hrkaći, Pavkovići, Tribošić, and Solde (Donji Crnač).

== History ==
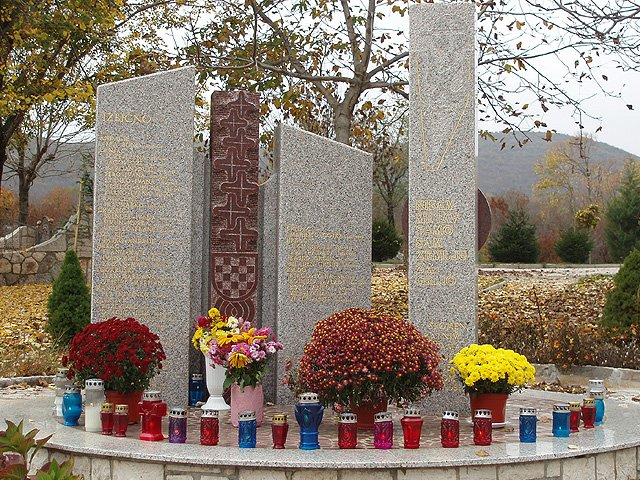
A monument to the victims of World War II and Croatian War of Independence.

History of Izbično is about 200 years old. The oldest document is from 1896. The main families that belong to Izbično are Pavković, Hrkać and Crnjac. The Soldos are part of the Donji Crnač Municipality of villages but is more connected to Izbično than to Donji Crnač.

== Geography ==
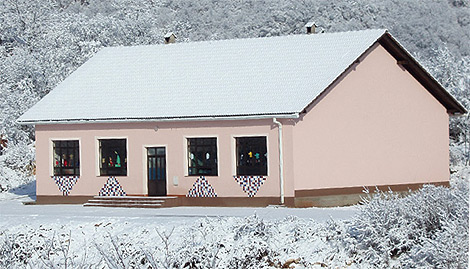
Izbično Elementary School

=== Placement ===
Izbično is placed in West Herzegovina Canton, about 10 km away from Široki Brijeg. Izbično is on the border of the Mediterranean climate and Temperate climates. The hill Varda is the border between these two temperate zones. due to its rugged terrain, in the past years due to the war in Syria and Iraq, Izbično has started to produce more Immortelle flower (Smilje).

=== Altitude ===
Altitude of Izbično is about 600m height above sea level.

=== Climate ===
Climate in Izbično is moderately-warm with warm summers and cold winters with snow.

== Population ==
In 2010, Izbično had 470 inhabitants in 149 families. In the period from 1991 until 2007, 86 peoples were baptised in the Izbično's church, and 123 people have died. Therefore, the rate of natural increase is negative by 37 people in 17 years. According to the 2013 census, its population was 196, all Croats.

National structure
Croatian	100%
Others	0%

=== Natural increase ===
Statistic of the parish - born and dead (1991–2007):

Year	Born	Died	Year	Born	Died
1990	7	16	2000	5	12
1991	12	11	2001	6	7
1992	7	25	2002	5	8
1993	10	17	2003	6	18
1994	10	9	2004	6	8
1995	17	10	2005	8	11
1996	15	10	2006	3	13
1997	8	21	2007	3	12
1998	8	11			
1999	12	14	Total	86	123

== Izbičijada ==
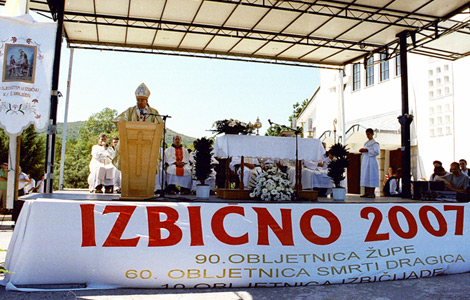
Detail from 2007 Izbičijada

Izbičijada is a festival held on the Polje (a field), every year on August 16 since 1997. Izbičijada begins with a mass in the church of Izbično, and then continues in Polje. The fest there usually starts with a football match, and afterwards people gather in large tents or beer gardens. Famous people have attended these events including Marko Perković Thompson, Mate Bulić and during the tenth anniversary of Izbičijada, The Kardinal of Sarajevo and Vrhbosna Vinko Puljić. Kardinal Puljić has had mass in the Izbično church but has never had mass in the Široki Brijeg Church.

Izbično, and the surrounding areas of Široki Brijeg were subject to partisan soldiers who were looking for signs of any sort of nationalism to a Croatian state. Many people during this time period were sent to jail for just singing Folk tunes passed down through generations. This festival is also the celebration of the two Dragicas, who were killed by the Partisans just for not disclosing the location of their husbands, which the partisans disclosed later that the two Dragicas did not know where they were. The two Dragicas were sisters-in-law and part of their punishment was to be hung outside in water soaked clothes on the coldest night of the year. In the morning, both were still alive. They were forced to strip and in doing so stripped the skin off their bodies. The mother, and Mother-in-law of the two Dragicas, were called outside by the Partisan Soldiers to dig a hole. The Dragicas were shot, wounded and were buried alive by their Mother.

Since then, in the early 1990s, Rajko Pavković had skin cancer. Unfortunately during the times of Yugoslavia there was no opportunity to take care of the Dragicas' grave. Rajko built a fence around the site to ensure that cows would not walk on the grave and graze the land around it. Within the next weeks, Rajko's Cancer disappeared. Since then, people from the village and the surrounding areas have come to pray at the grave sight. Ultimately Izbičijada is celebrat and miracles that the Dragicas have performed, and how the Dragicas are Croatian Martyrs.

There are many people that come from Izbično that live around the world. This festival is an opportunity after the feast day of the Assumption of Mary on the 15th of August for the diaspora to come together. Many left during the Yugoslavian regime, to move to Austria and Canada. Many who returned from Canada to visit family in Izbično, before 1991, were tortured and interrogated since they left on visitors visa to Canada and claimed refugee status upon arrival to Canada.

== Sports ==
Izbično has a local football team which plays in the Široki Brijeg communities' league, held every summer.
