= Mostarsko Blato Hydroelectric Power Station =

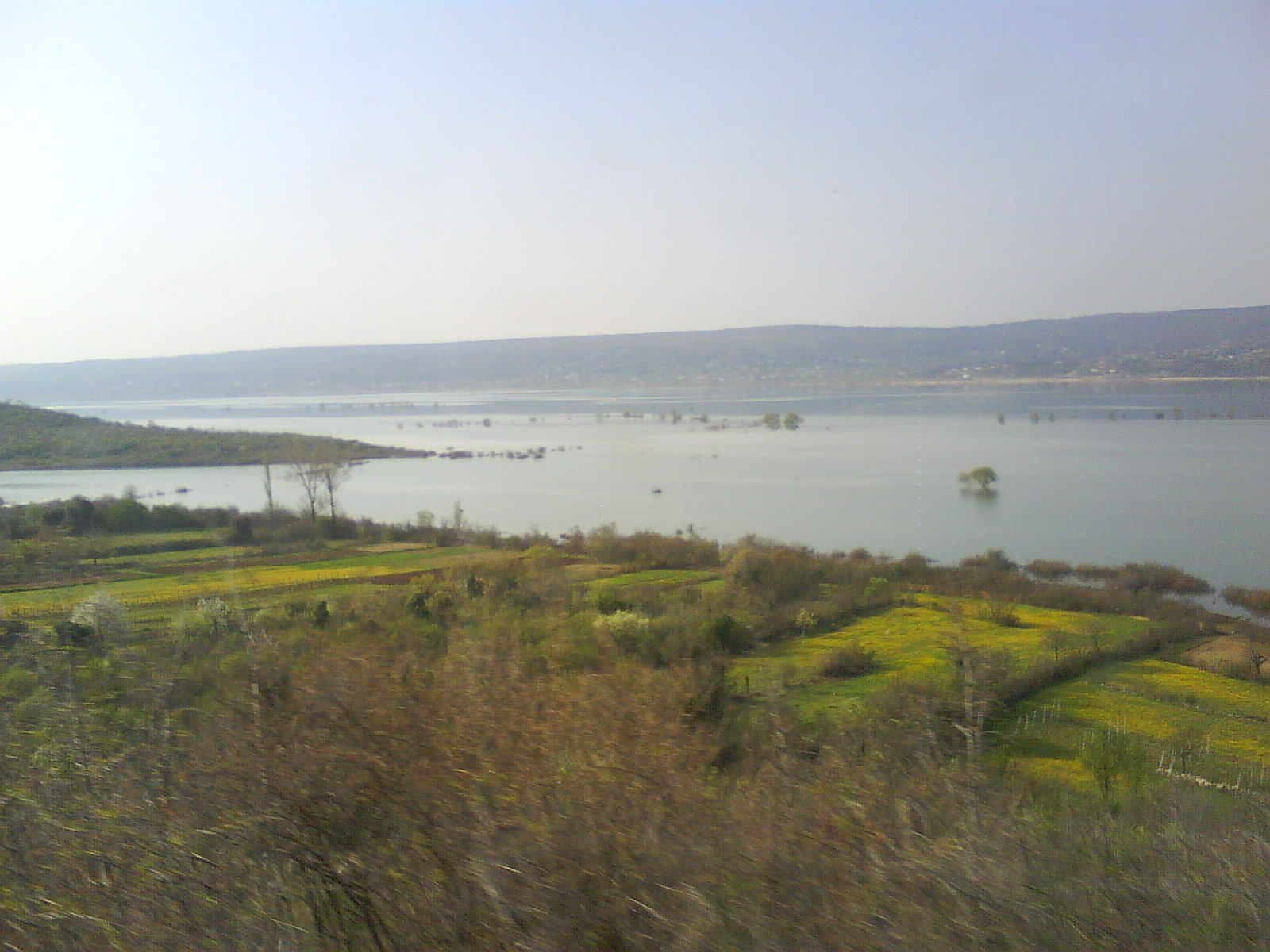

- Location within Bosnia and Herzegovina
- Interactive map of Mostarsko Blato Hydroelectric Power Station
- Country: Bosnia and Herzegovina
- Location: Jasenica, Rodoč
- Coordinates: 43.298844°N 17.794264°E
- Purpose: Power
- Status: Operational
- Opening date: 2010; 16 years ago
- Owner: Federation of Bosnia and Herzegovina entity government

Dam and spillways
- Height: 103 m (338 ft)
- Length: 230 m (750 ft)
- Elevation at crest: 598 m (1,962 ft)
- Dam volume: 1,450,000 m^{3} (1,900,000 cu yd)
- Spillway capacity: 40 m^{3}/s (1,400 cu ft/s)

Reservoir
- Creates: Mostarsko Blato
- Total capacity: 16,000,000 m^{3} (13,000 acre⋅ft)
- Active capacity: 466,000,000 m^{3} (378,000 acre⋅ft)
- Catchment area: 550 km^{2} (210 mi^{2})
- Surface area: 14.74 km^{2} (5.69 mi^{2})
- Normal elevation: 595 m (1,952 ft)

Mostarsko Blato Hydroelectric Power Station
- Coordinates: 43.298844°N 17.794264°E
- Operator: JP Elektroprivreda HZ HB d.d.
- Type: Conventional, diversion (run-of-the-river)
- Turbines: 2 x 30 MW Francis-type

The Mostarsko Blato Hydroelectric Power Station is hydroelectric power station on the Lištica river/Jasenica in Bosnia and Herzegovina, with an installed capacity of 60 MW.

== See also ==
- List of power stations in Bosnia-Herzegovina
