= Donji Gradac =

Donji Gradac may refer to:

- Donji Gradac, Konjic, a village in Konjic, Bosnia and Herzegovina
- Donji Gradac, Široki Brijeg, a village in Široki Brijeg, Bosnia and Herzegovina
