= Ivan Softa =

Croatian poet and writer (1906–1945)

- Born: Ivan Softa; 31 July 1906; Smokinje, Široki Brijeg
- Died: 1945 (aged 38–39)
- Occupations: Writer, poet
- Writing career
- Language: Croatian
- Period: 1936–1945
- Notable work: Na cesti

Ivan Softa (31 July 1906 – 1945) was a Croatian writer and poet. He was often compared to Maxim Gorky because his first novel Na cesti is known as one of the best Croatian social realism books.

Born in Smokinje near Široki Brijeg in 1906, he attended elementary school in Rasno. Due to poverty he emigrated to Slavonia and later moved to Zagreb in 1934. Unemployment and uncertainty inspired him to write his first novel - Na cesti (On the Road), which gained success within Croatian literary critic, especially due to social dimension of the novel and influence of social realism.

Except social themes, his works include motives of Herzegovina, his birth region, and its tradition and folklore (Dani jada i glada).

His works were target of censorship during Yugoslav Communist regime.

== Works ==
- Na cesti, 1936
- Dani jada i glada, 1937
- Nemirni mir, 1940
- Razrovano ognjište
- Sabrana djela, 1994
