= Oklaji =

- Village
- Location within Bosnia and Herzegovina
- Coordinates: 43°24′N 17°35′E
- Country: Bosnia and Herzegovina
- Entity: Federation of Bosnia and Herzegovina
- Canton: West Herzegovina
- Municipality: Široki Brijeg

Area
  - Total: 1.46 sq mi (3.79 km^{2})

Population (2013)
  - Total: 1,116
  - Density: 763/sq mi (294/km^{2})
- Time zone: UTC+1 (CET)
  - Summer (DST): UTC+2 (CEST)

Oklaji is a village in Bosnia and Herzegovina. According to the 1991 census, the village is located in the municipality of Široki Brijeg.

== Demographics ==
According to the 2013 census, its population was 1,116.

Ethnicity in 2013
Ethnicity	Number	Percentage
Croats	1,114	99.8%
Serbs	1	0.1%
other/undeclared	1	0.1%
Total	1,116	100%
