= Buhovo, Široki Brijeg =

Buhovo
- Village
- Location within Bosnia and Herzegovina
- Coordinates: 43°45′N 17°12′E
- Country: Bosnia and Herzegovina
- Entity: Federation of Bosnia and Herzegovina
- Canton: West Herzegovina
- Municipality: Široki Brijeg

Area
  - Total: 6.91 sq mi (17.90 km^{2})

Population (2013)
  - Total: 408
  - Density: 59.0/sq mi (22.8/km^{2})
- Time zone: UTC+1 (CET)
  - Summer (DST): UTC+2 (CEST)

Buhovo is a village in Bosnia and Herzegovina. According to the 1991 census, the village is located in the municipality of Široki Brijeg.

== Demographics ==
According to the 2013 census, its population was 408, all Croats.
