= Doci, Široki Brijeg =

Doci Доци
- Village
- Location within Bosnia and Herzegovina
- Coordinates: 43°15′48″N 17°28′11″E
- Country: Bosnia and Herzegovina
- Entity: Federation of Bosnia and Herzegovina
- Canton: West Herzegovina
- Municipality: Široki Brijeg

Area
  - Total: 1.52 sq mi (3.94 km^{2})

Population (2013)
  - Total: 189
  - Density: 124/sq mi (48.0/km^{2})
- Time zone: UTC+1 (CET)
  - Summer (DST): UTC+2 (CEST)

Doci (Serbian: Доци) is a village in Bosnia and Herzegovina. According to the 1991 census, the village is located in the municipality of Široki Brijeg.

== Demographics ==
According to the 2013 census, its population was 189, all Croats.
