= Lištica (river) =

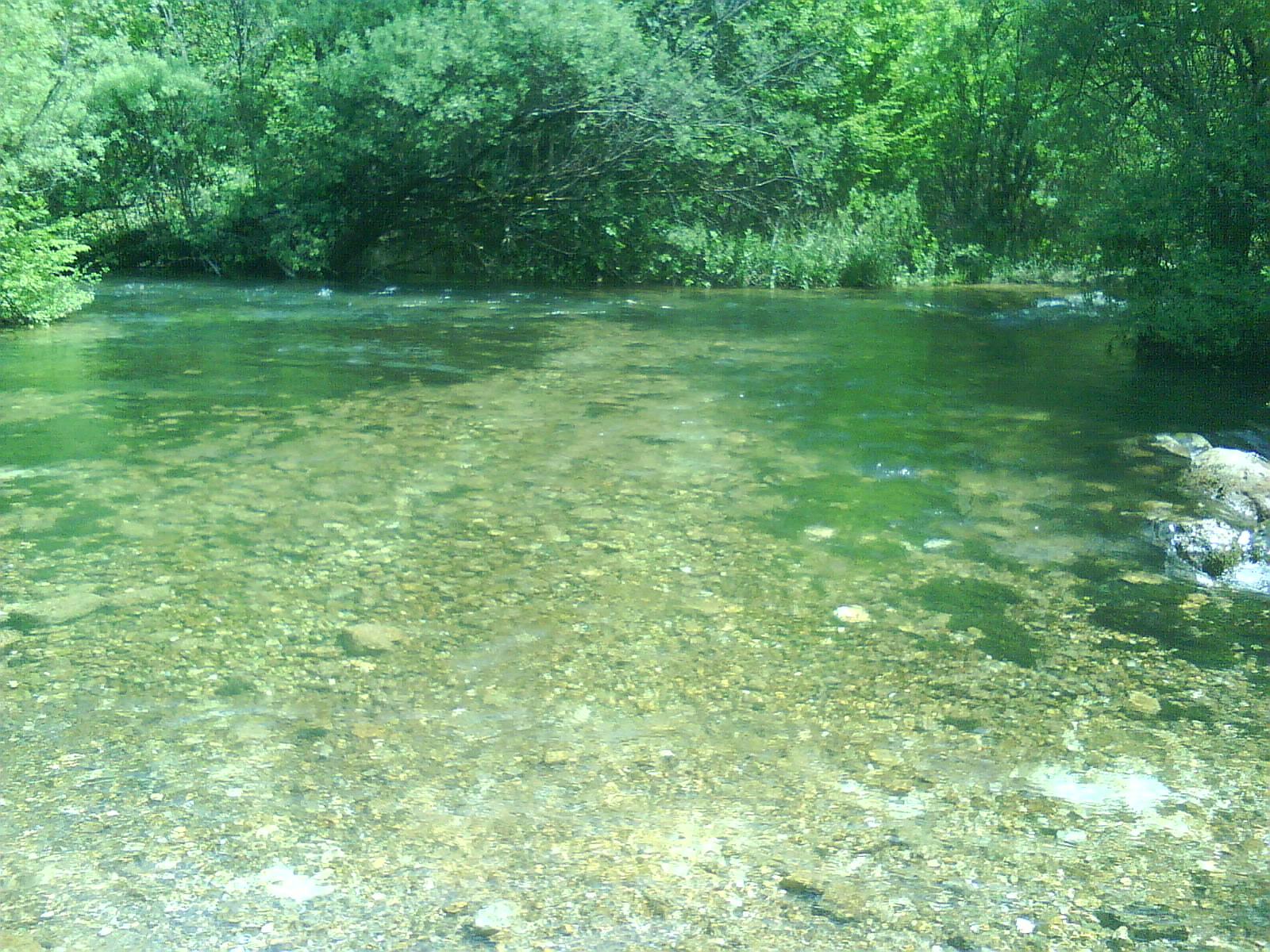
- Lištica river in Široki Brijeg

- Location within Bosnia and Herzegovina

Location
- Country: Bosnia and Herzegovina

Physical characteristics
- Mouth
  - location: Neretva
  - coordinates: 43.2534°N 17.8244°E

Basin features
- Progression: Ugrovača→ Brina→ Lištica→ Jasenica→ Neretva→ Adriatic Sea

Lištica is a sinking river in Bosnia and Herzegovina. It starts under the name Ugrovača, and end its course as the Jasenica in Mostarsko Polje, before spills into the Neretva as its right-bank tributary. It is listed as the second coldest river in Europe, and is prone to constant flooding mostly during winter. The Lištica river connects with the Borak wellspring, which rises at the base of the mountainside on the outskirts of town of Široki Brijeg. The town of Široki Brijeg was named Lištica after the Lištica River during the SFR Yugoslavia (1945–1990) but changed its name when the country dissolved back into Bosnia and Herzegovina.

== Course ==
The river begins as the Ugrovača river, runs through canyon where it pick-ups a new name, the Brina, and flows into the town of Široki Brijeg. Here it connects with the Borak wellspring, thus creating the Lištica river. The Lištica sinks in the area of Mostarsko Blato seasonal lake, and appears again in Rodoč suburb of Mostar as the Jasenica. After short course it empties into the Neretva near Ortiješ, south of Mostar.

== Water utilization ==
The river Lištica is prone to constant flooding mostly during winter. For this reason waters of the Lištica is utilized in with Mostarsko Blato Hydroelectric Power Station. The power station itself is located further beyond mountainous barrier, at the other side of the long tunnel perforated in the direction of former subterranean flow. Rest of the Lištica waters rises little further away as the Jasenica river, in eponymous village of Jasenica, Rodoč. Installed capacity of this plant is 60 MW. Today the Lištica river around Široki Brijeg is primarily used to turn the water mills that grind wheat and it serves as a sightseeing attraction for the tourists visiting the town.
