= Rujan, Široki Brijeg =

Rujan
- Village
- Location within Bosnia and Herzegovina
- Coordinates: 43.4181°N 17.4403°E
- Country: Bosnia and Herzegovina
- Entity: Federation of Bosnia and Herzegovina
- Canton: West Herzegovina
- Municipality: Široki Brijeg

Area
  - Total: 2.42 sq mi (6.26 km^{2})

Population (2013)
  - Total: 141
  - Density: 58.3/sq mi (22.5/km^{2})
- Time zone: UTC+1 (CET)
  - Summer (DST): UTC+2 (CEST)

Rujan is a village in Bosnia and Herzegovina. According to the 1991 census, the village is located in the municipality of Široki Brijeg.

== Demographics ==
According to the 2013 census, its population was 141, all Croats.
