= Ljubotići =

Ljubotići Љуботићи
- Village
- Location within Bosnia and Herzegovina
- Coordinates: 43°24′34″N 17°31′06″E
- Country: Bosnia and Herzegovina
- Entity: Federation of Bosnia and Herzegovina
- Canton: West Herzegovina
- Municipality: Široki Brijeg

Area
  - Total: 7.06 sq mi (18.28 km^{2})

Population (2013)
  - Total: 871
  - Density: 123/sq mi (47.6/km^{2})
- Time zone: UTC+1 (CET)
  - Summer (DST): UTC+2 (CEST)

Ljubotići (Serbian: Љуботићи) is a village in Bosnia and Herzegovina. According to the 1991 census, the village is located in the municipality of Široki Brijeg.

== Demographics ==
According to the 2013 census, its population was 871, all Croats.
