= Gornja Britvica =

Gornja Britvica Горња Бритвица
- Village
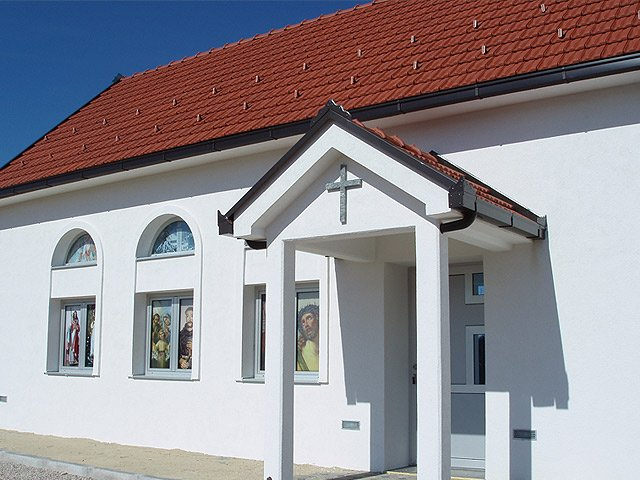
- Church in village Gornja Britvica,Bosnia and Herzegovina

- Location within Bosnia and Herzegovina
- Country: Bosnia and Herzegovina
- Entity: Federation of Bosnia and Herzegovina
- Canton: West Herzegovina
- Municipality: Široki Brijeg

Area
  - Total: 5.12 sq mi (13.25 km^{2})

Population (2013)
  - Total: 58
  - Density: 11/sq mi (4.4/km^{2})
- Time zone: UTC+1 (CET)
  - Summer (DST): UTC+2 (CEST)

Gornja Britvica (Serbian: Горња Бритвица) is a village in Bosnia and Herzegovina. According to the 1991 census, the village is located in the municipality of Široki Brijeg.

== Demographics ==
According to the 2013 census, its population was 58, all Croats.
