= Rasno, Široki Brijeg =

Rasno Расно
- Village
- Location within Bosnia and Herzegovina
- Coordinates: 43.325672°N 17.519456°E
- Country: Bosnia and Herzegovina
- Entity: Federation of Bosnia and Herzegovina
- Canton: West Herzegovina
- Municipality: Široki Brijeg

Area
  - Total: 9.64 sq mi (24.97 km^{2})

Population (2013)
  - Total: 621
  - Density: 64.4/sq mi (24.9/km^{2})
- Time zone: UTC+1 (CET)
  - Summer (DST): UTC+2 (CEST)

Rasno (Serbian: Расно) is a village in Bosnia and Herzegovina. According to the 1991 census, the village is located in the municipality of Široki Brijeg.

== Demographics ==
According to the 2013 census, its population was 621.

Ethnicity in 2013
| Ethnicity | Number | Percentage |
|---|---|---|
| Croats | 620 | 99.8% |
| other/undeclared | 1 | 0.2% |
| Total | 621 | 100% |

== Famous people ==
- Ivan Softa (1906-1945), Croatian writer
