= Elektroprivreda HZ HB =

JP Elektroprivreda HZ HB d.d.
- Type: Joint-stock company
- Industry: power, electrical energy
- Founded: 28 August 1992; 34 years ago
- Headquarters: Petra Krešimira IV 6-A, Mostar, Bosnia and Herzegovina
- Key people: Drago Bago (General Manager)
- Products: electrical energy
- Services: power generation, distribution system operation, electrical energy supply and electrical energy erading
- Revenue: ▲€478.9 million (2021)
- Net income: ▲€1.22 million (2021)
- Total assets: ▲€1.185 billion (2021)
- Total equity: ▲€435.48 million (2021)
- Owner: Federation of Bosnia and Herzegovina (90%); Others
- Number of employees: 2,322 (2026)
- Website: www.ephzhb.ba

JP Elektroprivreda HZ HB d.d. (Croatian: JP Elektroprivreda Hrvatske zajednice Herceg Bosne) is a public power utility company based in Mostar, Bosnia and Herzegovina.

== History ==
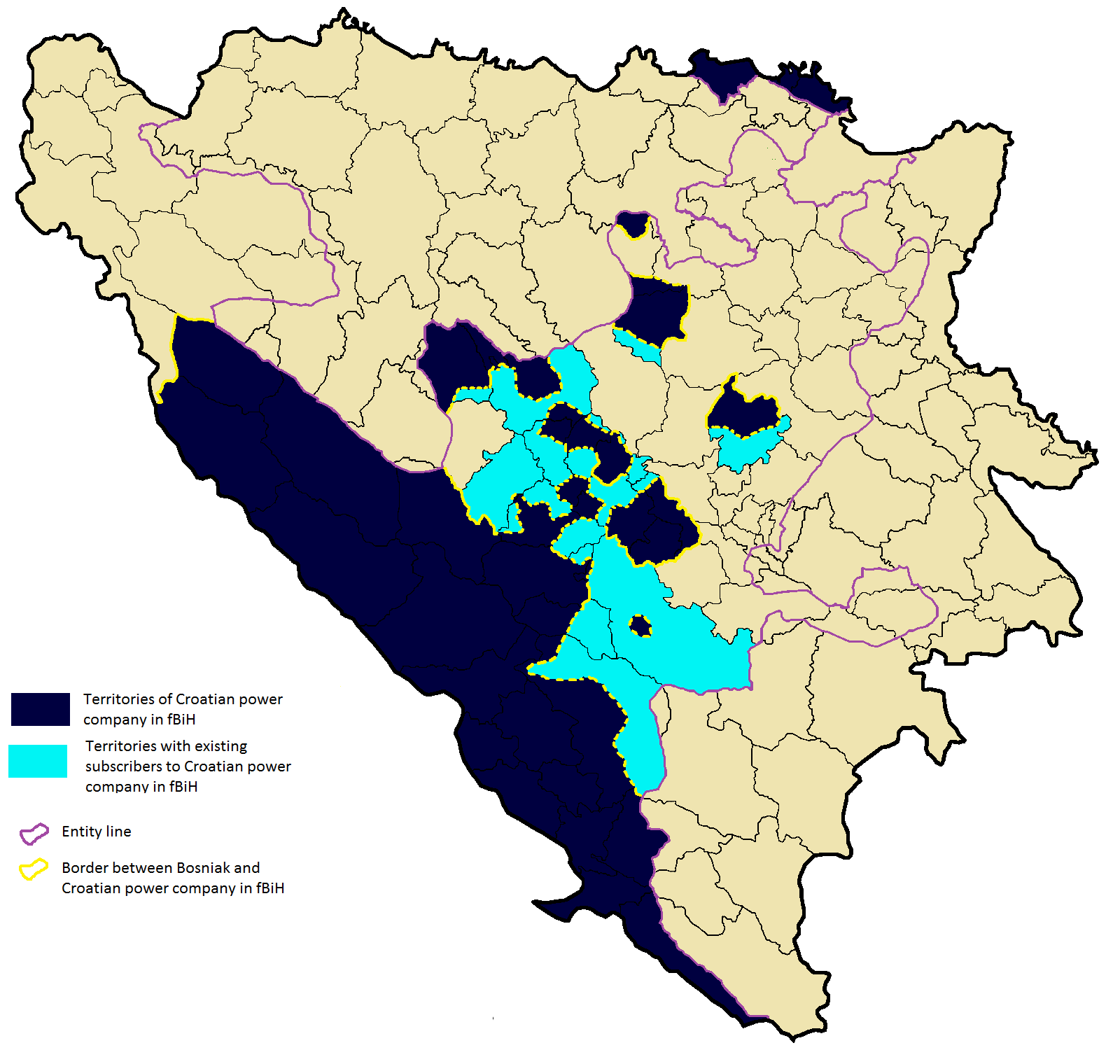
Area of operation

JP Elektroprivreda HZHB d.d. was formed on 28 August 1992 on Croats of Bosnia and Herzegovina and HVO dominated territory, and used as public utility company for territory of defunct Croatian Community of Herzeg-Bosnia. In 1999, EPHZHB had the electricity generation capacity of 762 MW, all from hydro power plants, while its distribution-level consumption was 1,075 GWh. On May 20, 2004 it became an entity government-owned publicly traded company.

In March 2018, EPHZHB launched a 50.6 MW Mesihovina wind power plant, located near the northwestern town of Tomislavgrad. It consists of 22 turbines and can produce 165.2 GWh of power a year, enough to supply 27,500 households.

=== Power generation and consumption ===
GWh

- generation
- consumption/sales

Source 2010–2015, 2016 2017, 2018

== Structure ==
90% of company stock is owned by Federation of Bosnia and Herzegovina entity government. It is listed on the Sarajevo Stock Exchange.

== Operations ==
The company operates mostly in Croatian-majority cantons and municipalities in Bosnia-Herzegovina, covering approximately 25% of the country's territory. It is the third largest utility company in the country, with 2,325 GWh of electricity generation in 2015 (14,8% of the total generation in the country). It employs over 1,500 people and operates seven hydropower plants and one wind power plant:

- Čapljina Hydroelectric Power Plant, Čapljina
- Rama Hydroelectric Power Plant, Prozor-Rama
- HPP "Mostar", Mostar
- Mostarsko Blato Hydroelectric Power Plant, Mostar
- Jajce-1 HPP, Jajce
- Jajce-2 HPP, Jajce
- MHE "Peć Mlini", Grude
- Mesihovina - Wind Power Plant (hr), Tomislavgrad

== See also ==
- List of companies of Bosnia and Herzegovina
- Elektroprivreda Bosne i Hercegovine
- Elektroprivreda Republike Srpske
