= Crne Lokve =

- Village
- Location within Bosnia and Herzegovina
- Coordinates: 43.4417°N 17.4633°E
- Country: Bosnia and Herzegovina
- Entity: Federation of Bosnia and Herzegovina
- Canton: West Herzegovina
- Municipality: Široki Brijeg

Area
  - Total: 8.09 sq mi (20.95 km^{2})

Population (2013)
  - Total: 142
  - Density: 17.6/sq mi (6.78/km^{2})
- Time zone: UTC+1 (CET)
  - Summer (DST): UTC+2 (CEST)

Crne Lokve (Croatian:Crne Lokve) is a village in Bosnia and Herzegovina. According to the 1991 census, the village is located in the municipality of Široki Brijeg. According to the first results of the 2013 Bosnian census, it has 163 inhabitants.

== Demographics ==
According to the 2013 census, its population was 142.

Ethnicity in 2013
Ethnicity	Number	Percentage
Croats	140	98.6%
Bosniaks	2	1.4%
Total	142	100%
