= Podvranić =

- Village
- Location within Bosnia and Herzegovina
- Country: Bosnia and Herzegovina
- Entity: Federation of Bosnia and Herzegovina
- Canton: West Herzegovina
- Municipality: Široki Brijeg

Area
  - Total: 1.06 sq mi (2.75 km^{2})

Population (2013)
  - Total: 150
  - Density: 140/sq mi (55/km^{2})
- Time zone: UTC+1 (CET)
  - Summer (DST): UTC+2 (CEST)

Podvranić is a village in Bosnia and Herzegovina. According to the 1991 census, the village is located in the municipality of Široki Brijeg. With 100% of the population being Croats.

== Demographics ==
According to the 2013 census, its population was 150, all Croats.
