= Trn, Široki Brijeg =

Trn
- Village
- Location within Bosnia and Herzegovina
- Country: Bosnia and Herzegovina
- Entity: Federation of Bosnia and Herzegovina
- Canton: West Herzegovina
- Municipality: Široki Brijeg

Area
  - Total: 1.89 sq mi (4.90 km^{2})

Population (2013)
  - Total: 2,487
  - Density: 1,310/sq mi (508/km^{2})
- Time zone: UTC+1 (CET)
  - Summer (DST): UTC+2 (CEST)

Trn is a village in Bosnia and Herzegovina. According to the 1991 census, the village is located in the municipality of Široki Brijeg.

== Demographics ==
According to the 2013 census, its population was 2,487.

Ethnicity in 2013
Ethnicity	Number	Percentage
Croats	2,472	99.4%
other/undeclared	15	0.6%
Total	2,487	100%
