= Lise, Široki Brijeg =

Lise
- Village
- Location within Bosnia and Herzegovina
- Country: Bosnia and Herzegovina
- Entity: Federation of Bosnia and Herzegovina
- Canton: West Herzegovina
- Municipality: Široki Brijeg

Area
  - Total: 1.41 sq mi (3.66 km^{2})

Population (2013)
  - Total: 2,025
  - Density: 1,430/sq mi (553/km^{2})
- Time zone: UTC+1 (CET)
  - Summer (DST): UTC+2 (CEST)

Lise is a village in Bosnia and Herzegovina. According to the 1991 census, the village is located in the municipality of Široki Brijeg.

== Demographics ==
According to the 2013 census, its population was 2,025.

Ethnicity in 2013
Ethnicity	Number	Percentage
Croats	2,023	99.9%
Bosniaks	2	0.1%
Total	2,025	100%
