= Jare, Široki Brijeg =

Jare
- Village
- Location within Bosnia and Herzegovina
- Country: Bosnia and Herzegovina
- Entity: Federation of Bosnia and Herzegovina
- Canton: West Herzegovina
- Municipality: Široki Brijeg

Area
  - Total: 4.92 sq mi (12.75 km^{2})

Population (2013)
  - Total: 880
  - Density: 180/sq mi (69/km^{2})
- Time zone: UTC+1 (CET)
  - Summer (DST): UTC+2 (CEST)

Jare is a village in Bosnia and Herzegovina. According to the 1991 census, the village is located in the municipality of Široki Brijeg.

== Demographics ==
According to the 2013 census, its population was 880.

Ethnicity in 2013
Ethnicity	Number	Percentage
Croats	879	99.9%
Ostalo stanovništvo	1	0.1%
Total	880	100%
