= Donja Britvica =

Donja Britvica Доња Бритвица
- Village
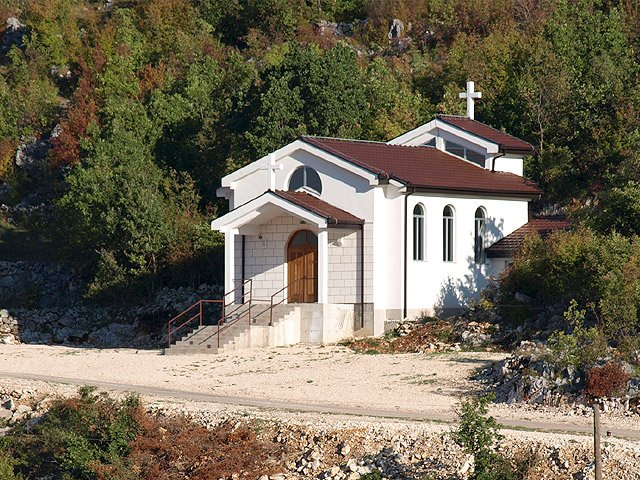

- Location within Bosnia and Herzegovina
- Coordinates: 43°26′N 17°31′E
- Country: Bosnia and Herzegovina
- Entity: Federation of Bosnia and Herzegovina
- Canton: West Herzegovina
- Municipality: Široki Brijeg

Area
  - Total: 3.03 sq mi (7.84 km^{2})

Population (2013)
  - Total: 169
  - Density: 55.8/sq mi (21.6/km^{2})
- Time zone: UTC+1 (CET)
  - Summer (DST): UTC+2 (CEST)

Donja Britvica (Serbian: Доња Бритвица) is a village in Bosnia and Herzegovina. According to the 1991 census, the village is located in the municipality of Široki Brijeg.

== Demographics ==
According to the 2013 census, its population was 169.

Ethnicity in 2013
Ethnicity	Number	Percentage
Croats	168	99.4%
other/undeclared	1	0.6%
Total	169	100%
