= Dobrkovići =

- Village
- Location within Bosnia and Herzegovina
- Country: Bosnia and Herzegovina
- Entity: Federation of Bosnia and Herzegovina
- Canton: West Herzegovina
- Municipality: Široki Brijeg

Area
  - Total: 3.23 sq mi (8.37 km^{2})

Population (2013)
  - Total: 563
  - Density: 174/sq mi (67.3/km^{2})
- Time zone: UTC+1 (CET)
  - Summer (DST): UTC+2 (CEST)

Dobrkovići is a village in Bosnia and Herzegovina. According to the 1991 census, the village is located in the municipality of Široki Brijeg.

== Demographics ==
According to the 2013 census, its population was 563.

Ethnicity in 2013
Ethnicity	Number	Percentage
Croats	562	99.8%
other/undeclared	1	0.2%
Total	563	100%
