= Kočerin =

Kočerin Ⰽⱁⱍⰵⱃⰻⱀ
- Village
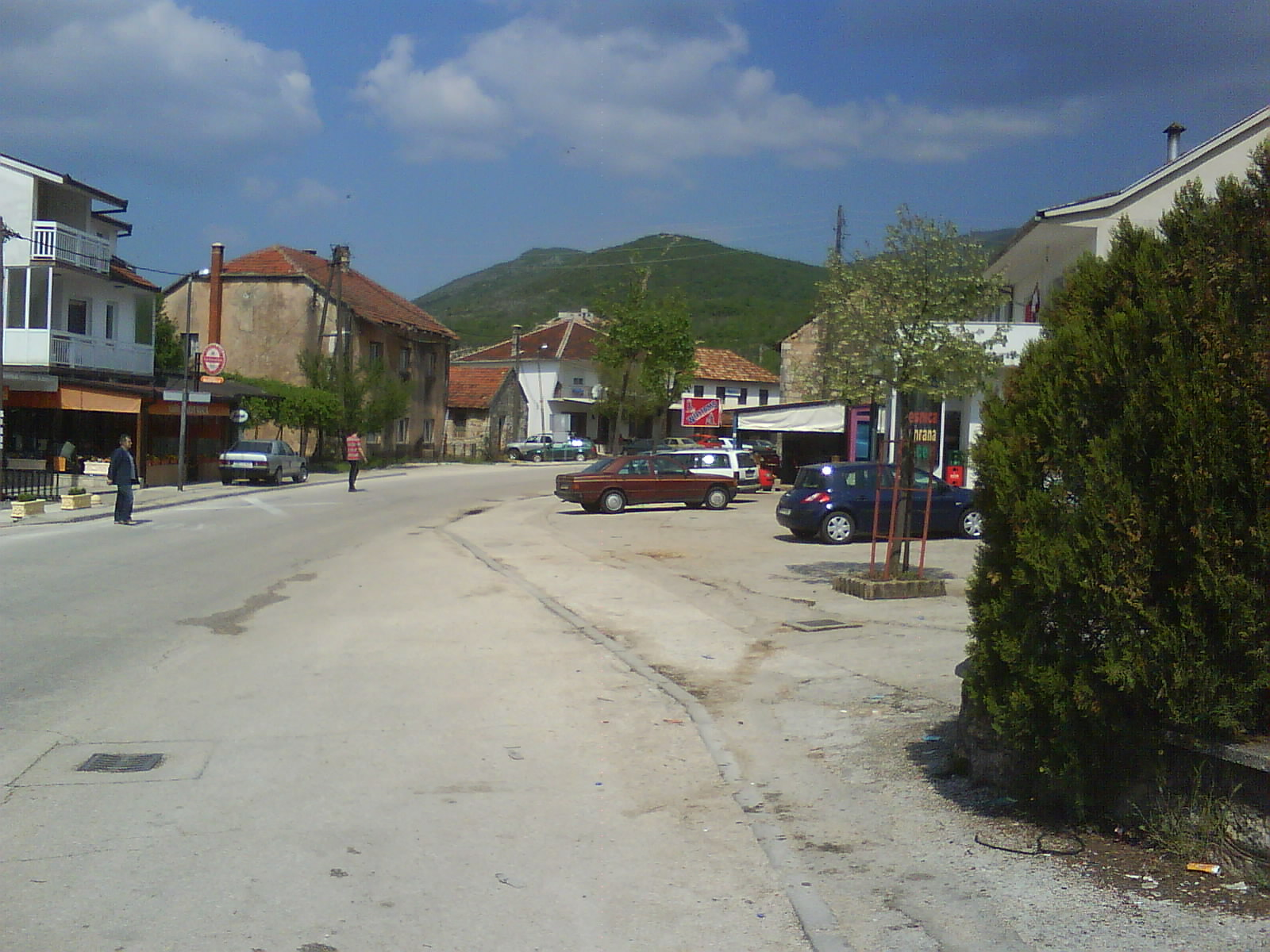
- The main street

- Location within Bosnia and Herzegovina
- Coordinates: 43°23′N 17°29′E
- Country: Bosnia and Herzegovina
- Entity: Federation of Bosnia and Herzegovina
- Canton: West Herzegovina
- Municipality: Široki Brijeg

Area
  - Total: 4.61 sq mi (11.93 km^{2})

Population (2013)
  - Total: 1,195
  - Density: 259.4/sq mi (100.2/km^{2})
- Time zone: UTC+1 (CET)
  - Summer (DST): UTC+2 (CEST)

Kočerin (Croatian: Ⰽⱁⱍⰵⱃⰻⱀ) is a village in Bosnia and Herzegovina. According to the 1991 census, the village is located in the municipality of Široki Brijeg.

== Demographics ==
According to the 2013 census, its population was 1,195.

Ethnicity in 2013
Ethnicity	Number	Percentage
Croats	1,191	99.7%
other/undeclared	4	0.3%
Total	1,195	100%

== Villages ==
- Kolobarića Dolac
