= Gornji Mamići =

Gornji Mamići Горњи Мамићи
- Village
- Location within Bosnia and Herzegovina
- Coordinates: 43.379455°N 17.464603°E
- Country: Bosnia and Herzegovina
- Entity: Federation of Bosnia and Herzegovina
- Canton: West Herzegovina
- Municipality: Široki Brijeg

Area
  - Total: 2.80 sq mi (7.24 km^{2})

Population (2013)
  - Total: 602
  - Density: 215/sq mi (83.1/km^{2})
- Time zone: UTC+1 (CET)
  - Summer (DST): UTC+2 (CEST)

Gornji Mamići (Serbian: Горњи Мамићи) is a village in Bosnia and Herzegovina. According to the 1991 census, the village is located in the municipality of Široki Brijeg.

== Demographics ==
According to the 2013 census, its population was 800.

Ethnicity in 2013
Ethnicity	Number	Percentage
Croats	601	99.8%
other/undeclared	1	0.2%
Total	602	100%
