= Trebišnica =

- Location within Bosnia and Herzegovina
- Coordinates: 42°55′43″N 17°50′10″E
- Country: Bosnia
- Entity: Federation of Bosnia and Herzegovina
- Time zone: UTC+1 (CET)
  - Summer (DST): UTC+2 (CEST)

Trebišnica is a municipality located to the southeast of Široki Brijeg in Bosnia and Herzegovina.

== See also ==
- Hutovo Lake
