= Dobrič =

- Village
- Location within Bosnia and Herzegovina
- Country: Bosnia and Herzegovina
- Entity: Federation of Bosnia and Herzegovina
- Canton: West Herzegovina
- Municipality: Široki Brijeg

Area
  - Total: 3.48 sq mi (9.02 km^{2})

Population (2013)
  - Total: 630
  - Density: 180/sq mi (70/km^{2})
- Time zone: UTC+1 (CET)
  - Summer (DST): UTC+2 (CEST)

Dobrič is a village in Bosnia and Herzegovina. According to the 1991 census, the village is located in the municipality of Široki Brijeg.

== Demographics ==
According to the 2013 census, its population was 630.

Ethnicity in 2013
Ethnicity	Number	Percentage
Croats	597	94.8%
Serbs	33	5.2%
Total	630	100%
