= Raška Gora =

- Village
- Location within Bosnia and Herzegovina
- Coordinates: 43.4416099°N 17.7667803°E
- Country: Bosnia and Herzegovina
- Entity: Federation of Bosnia and Herzegovina
- Canton: Herzegovina-Neretva
- Municipality: City of Mostar

Area
  - Total: 17.05 sq mi (44.15 km^{2})

Population (2013)
  - Total: 35
  - Density: 2.1/sq mi (0.79/km^{2})
- Time zone: UTC+1 (CET)
  - Summer (DST): UTC+2 (CEST)

Raška Gora is a village in the City of Mostar, Bosnia and Herzegovina.

== Demographics ==
According to the 2013 census, its population was 35, all Croats.
