= Gornji Gradac, Široki Brijeg =

Gornji Gradac
- Village
- Location within Bosnia and Herzegovina
- Country: Bosnia and Herzegovina
- Entity: Federation of Bosnia and Herzegovina
- Canton: West Herzegovina
- Municipality: Široki Brijeg

Area
  - Total: 7.53 sq mi (19.50 km^{2})

Population (2013)
  - Total: 208
  - Density: 27.6/sq mi (10.7/km^{2})
- Time zone: UTC+1 (CET)
  - Summer (DST): UTC+2 (CEST)

Gornji Gradac is a village in Široki Brijeg, Bosnia and Herzegovina. According to the 1991 census, the village is located in the municipality of Široki Brijeg.

== Demographics ==
According to the 2013 census, its population was 208, all Croats.
