= Gornji Gradac, Konjic =

Gornji Gradac Горњи Градац
- Village
- Location within Bosnia and Herzegovina
- Coordinates: 43°43′42″N 17°51′54″E
- Country: Bosnia and Herzegovina
- Entity: Federation of Bosnia and Herzegovina
- Canton: Herzegovina-Neretva
- Municipality: Konjic

Area
  - Total: 0.21 sq mi (0.54 km^{2})

Population (2013)
  - Total: 23
  - Density: 110/sq mi (43/km^{2})
- Time zone: UTC+1 (CET)
  - Summer (DST): UTC+2 (CEST)

Gornji Gradac (Cyrillic: Горњи Градац) is a village in the municipality of Konjic, Bosnia and Herzegovina.

== Demographics ==
According to the 2013 census, its population was 23.

Ethnicity in 2013
| Ethnicity | Number | Percentage |
|---|---|---|
| Bosniaks | 16 | 69.6% |
| Serbs | 5 | 21.7% |
| Croats | 2 | 8.7% |
| Total | 23 | 100% |
