= Vrdi =

- Village
- Location within Bosnia and Herzegovina
- Coordinates: 43.4958901°N 17.7069568°E
- Country: Bosnia and Herzegovina
- Entity: Federation of Bosnia and Herzegovina
- Canton: Herzegovina-Neretva
- Municipality: City of Mostar

Area
  - Total: 8.72 sq mi (22.58 km^{2})

Population (2013)
  - Total: 102
  - Density: 11.7/sq mi (4.52/km^{2})
- Time zone: UTC+1 (CET)
  - Summer (DST): UTC+2 (CEST)

Vrdi is a village in the City of Mostar, Bosnia and Herzegovina.

== Demographics ==
According to the 2013 census, its population was 102, all Croats.
