= Grabova Draga =

- Village
- Location within Bosnia and Herzegovina
- Coordinates: 43°24′N 17°41′E
- Country: Bosnia and Herzegovina
- Entity: Federation of Bosnia and Herzegovina
- Canton: West Herzegovina
- Municipality: Široki Brijeg

Area
  - Total: 4.56 sq mi (11.80 km^{2})

Population (2013)
  - Total: 45
  - Density: 9.9/sq mi (3.8/km^{2})
- Time zone: UTC+1 (CET)
  - Summer (DST): UTC+2 (CEST)

Grabova Draga is a village in the City of Široki Brijeg, West Herzegovina Canton of the Federation of Bosnia and Herzegovina in Bosnia and Herzegovina. According to the 1991 census, the village is located in the municipality of Široki Brijeg.

== Demographics ==
According to the 2013 census, its population was 45, all Croats.
