= Krivodol, Mostar =

Krivodol
- Village
- Location within Bosnia and Herzegovina
- Coordinates: 43.2805439°N 17.7621459°E
- Country: Bosnia and Herzegovina
- Entity: Federation of Bosnia and Herzegovina
- Canton: Herzegovina-Neretva
- Municipality: City of Mostar

Area
  - Total: 2.60 sq mi (6.74 km^{2})

Population (2013)
  - Total: 278
  - Density: 107/sq mi (41.2/km^{2})
- Time zone: UTC+1 (CET)
  - Summer (DST): UTC+2 (CEST)

Krivodol is a village in the City of Mostar, Bosnia and Herzegovina.

== Demographics ==
According to the 2013 census, its population was 278.

Ethnicity in 2013
Ethnicity	Number	Percentage
Croats	277	99.6%
Serbs	1	0.4%
Total	278	100%
