= Biograci =

Biograci Биограци
- Village
- Location within Bosnia and Herzegovina
- Coordinates: 43°19′N 17°41′E
- Country: Bosnia and Herzegovina
- Entity: Federation of Bosnia and Herzegovina
- Canton: West Herzegovina
- Municipality: Široki Brijeg

Area
  - Total: 3.90 sq mi (10.11 km^{2})

Population (2013)
  - Total: 800
  - Density: 200/sq mi (79/km^{2})
- Time zone: UTC+1 (CET)
  - Summer (DST): UTC+2 (CEST)

Biograci (Serbian: Биограци) is a village in Bosnia and Herzegovina. According to the 1991 census, the village is located in the municipality of Široki Brijeg.

== Demographics ==
According to the 2013 census, its population was 800.

Ethnicity in 2013
Ethnicity	Number	Percentage
Croats	795	99.4%
Serbs	4	0.5%
Bosniaks	0	0.0%
other/undeclared	1	0.1%
Total	800	100%
