= Gradac, Tutin =

Gradac
- Village (Selo)
- Location within Serbia
- Coordinates: 43°04′09″N 20°08′34″E
- Country: Serbia
- District: Raška District
- Municipality: Tutin

Population (2002)
  - Total: 95
- Time zone: UTC+1 (CET)
  - Summer (DST): UTC+2 (CEST)

Gradac is a village in the municipality of Tutin, Serbia. According to the 2002 census, the village has a population of 95 people.

== History ==
The Shkreli tribe migrated to the Pešter region in the 18th century. The majority of them were subsequently Slavicised, however in some villages such as and Gradac (Albanian: Gradaci), they managed to maintain the original Albanian language until this day.
