= Donji Gradac, Konjic =

Donji Gradac Доњи Градац
- Village
- Location within Bosnia and Herzegovina
- Coordinates: 43°43′33″N 17°51′43″E
- Country: Bosnia and Herzegovina
- Entity: Federation of Bosnia and Herzegovina
- Canton: Herzegovina-Neretva
- Municipality: Konjic

Area
  - Total: 0.62 sq mi (1.61 km^{2})

Population (2013)
  - Total: 88
  - Density: 140/sq mi (55/km^{2})
- Time zone: UTC+1 (CET)
  - Summer (DST): UTC+2 (CEST)

Donji Gradac (Cyrillic: Доњи Градац) is a village in the municipality of Konjic, Bosnia and Herzegovina.

== Demographics ==
According to the 2013 census, its population was 88, all Bosniaks.
