= Donji Crnač =

Donji Crnač Доњи Црнач
- Village
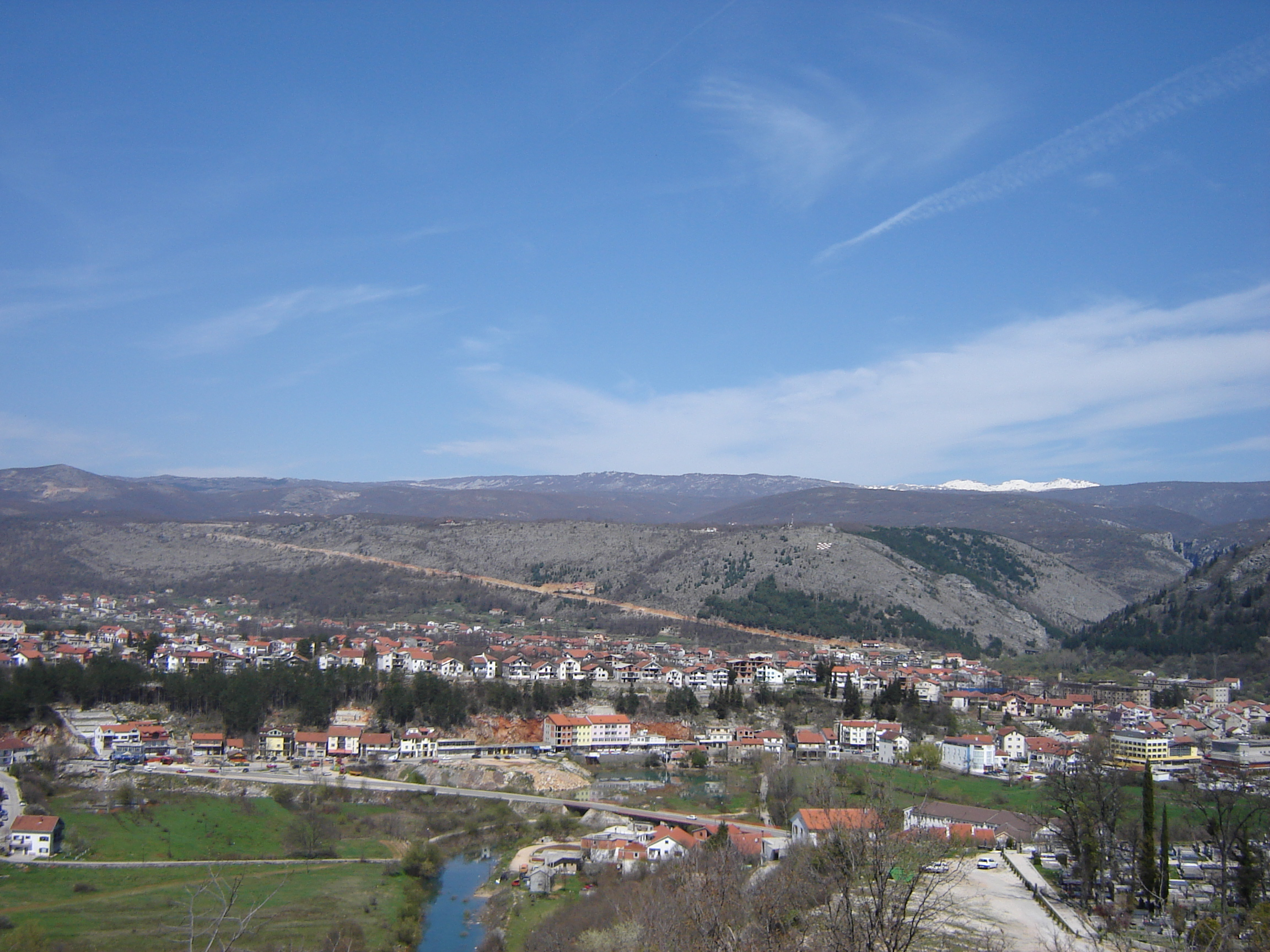

- Location within Bosnia and Herzegovina
- Coordinates: 43°26′07″N 17°34′04″E
- Country: Bosnia and Herzegovina
- Entity: Federation of Bosnia and Herzegovina
- Canton: West Herzegovina
- Municipality: Široki Brijeg

Area
  - Total: 11.07 sq mi (28.67 km^{2})

Population (2013)
  - Total: 569
  - Density: 51.4/sq mi (19.8/km^{2})
- Time zone: UTC+1 (CET)
  - Summer (DST): UTC+2 (CEST)

Donji Crnač (Serbian: Доњи Црнач) is a village in Bosnia and Herzegovina. According to the 1991 census, the village is located in the municipality of Široki Brijeg. Donji Crnač has about 740 inhabitants.

== Demographics ==
According to the 2013 census, its population was 569.

Ethnicity in 2013
Ethnicity	Number	Percentage
Croats	568	99.8%
other/undeclared	1	0.2%
Total	569	100%
