= Gornji Crnač =

Gornji Crnač Горњи Црнач
- Village
- Location within Bosnia and Herzegovina
- Country: Bosnia and Herzegovina
- Entity: Federation of Bosnia and Herzegovina
- Canton: West Herzegovina
- Municipality: Široki Brijeg

Area
  - Total: 11.67 sq mi (30.22 km^{2})

Population (2013)
  - Total: 183
  - Density: 15.7/sq mi (6.06/km^{2})
- Time zone: UTC+1 (CET)
  - Summer (DST): UTC+2 (CEST)

Gornji Crnač (Serbian: Горњи Црнач) is a village in Bosnia and Herzegovina. According to the 1991 census, the village is located in the municipality of Široki Brijeg.

== Demographics ==
According to the 2013 census, its population was 183, all Croats.
