= Donji Gradac, Široki Brijeg =

Donji Gradac
- Village
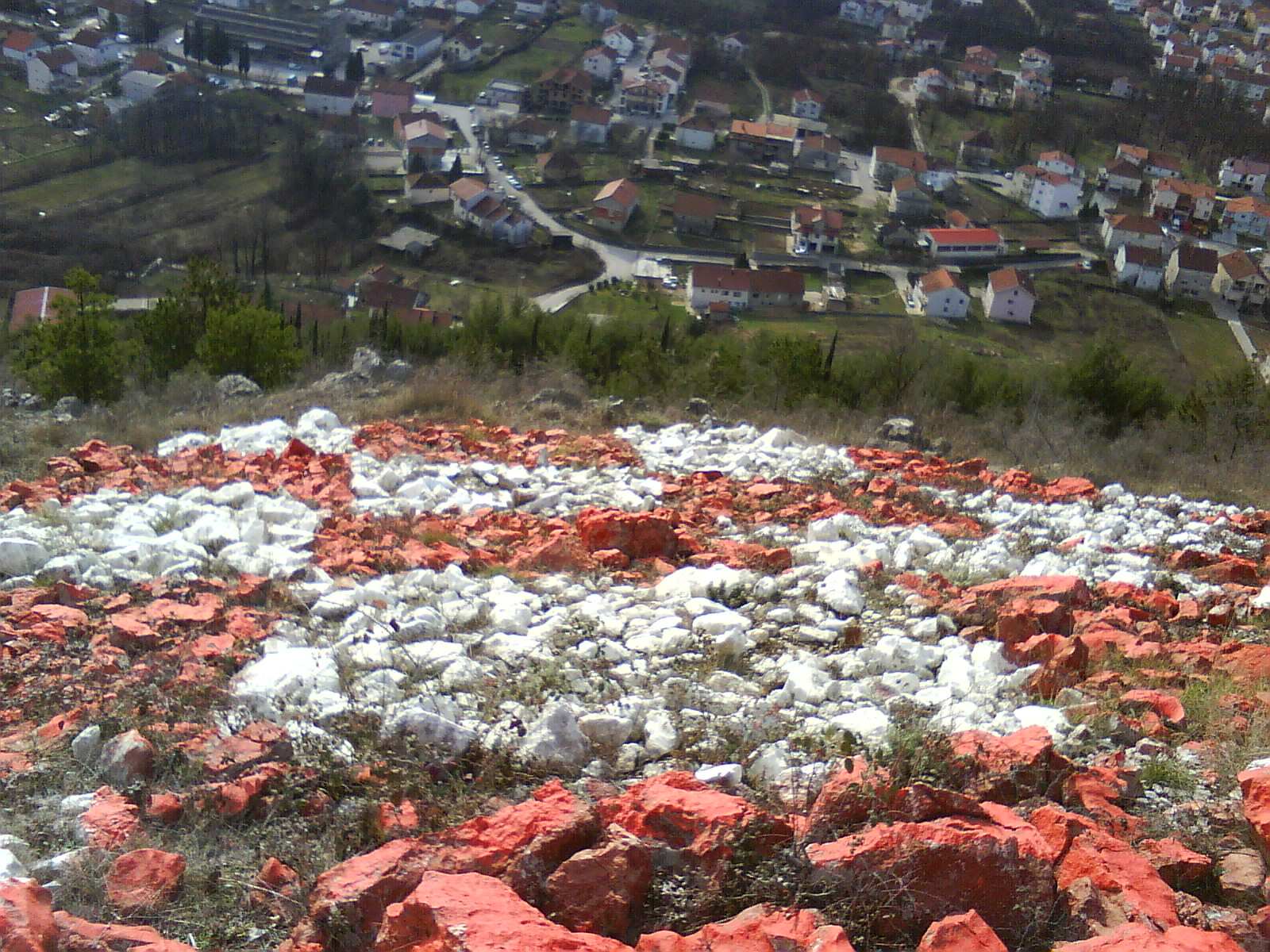

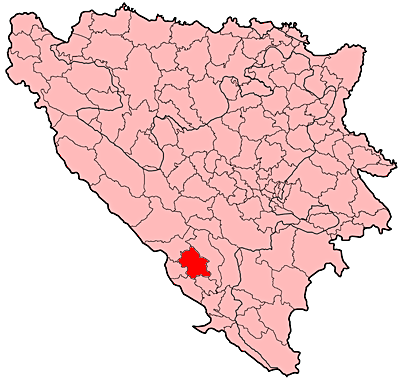

- Location within Bosnia and Herzegovina
- Coordinates: 43°22′20″N 17°38′19″E
- Country: Bosnia and Herzegovina
- Entity: Federation of Bosnia and Herzegovina
- Canton: West Herzegovina
- Municipality: Široki Brijeg

Area
  - Total: 4.00 sq mi (10.36 km^{2})

Population (2013)
  - Total: 672
  - Density: 168/sq mi (64.9/km^{2})
- Time zone: UTC+1 (CET)
  - Summer (DST): UTC+2 (CEST)

Donji Gradac is a village in Bosnia and Herzegovina. According to the 1991 census, the village is located in the municipality of Široki Brijeg.

== Demographics ==
According to the 2013 census, its population was 672.

Ethnicity in 2013
Ethnicity	Number	Percentage
Croats	666	99.1%
Serbs	1	0.1%
other/undeclared	5	0.7%
Total	672	100%
