= Sovići, Mostar =

Sovići
- Village
- Location within Bosnia and Herzegovina
- Coordinates: 43.3786602°N 17.7364825°E
- Country: Bosnia and Herzegovina
- Entity: Federation of Bosnia and Herzegovina
- Canton: Herzegovina-Neretva
- Municipality: City of Mostar

Area
  - Total: 4.34 sq mi (11.23 km^{2})

Population (2013)
  - Total: 4
  - Density: 0.92/sq mi (0.36/km^{2})
- Time zone: UTC+1 (CET)
  - Summer (DST): UTC+2 (CEST)

Sovići is a village in the City of Mostar, Bosnia and Herzegovina.

== Demographics ==
According to the 2013 census, its population was 4, all Croats.
