= Polog, Mostar =

Polog
- Village
- Location within Bosnia and Herzegovina
- Coordinates: 43°20′52.69″N 17°41′45.08″E
- Country: Bosnia and Herzegovina
- Entity: Federation of Bosnia and Herzegovina
- Canton: Herzegovina-Neretva
- Municipality: City of Mostar

Area
  - Total: 10.91 sq mi (28.26 km^{2})

Population (2013)
  - Total: 974
  - Density: 89.3/sq mi (34.5/km^{2})
- Time zone: UTC+1 (CET)
  - Summer (DST): UTC+2 (CEST)
- Postal code: 88000 (Same as Mostar)
- Area code: (+387) 36 345

Polog is a populated settlement in the Mostar municipality, Herzegovina-Neretva Canton, Federation of Bosnia and Herzegovina, Bosnia and Herzegovina. It is situated 11 kilometres (6.8 mi) west of the city of Mostar.

== History ==
In 1991, the residents of Polog stopped a column of tanks of the Yugoslav People's Army (JNA).

== Demographics ==
According to the 2013 census, its population was 974.

Ethnicity in 2013
Ethnicity	Number	Percentage
Croats	785	80.6%
Bosniaks	178	18.3%
Serbs	10	1.0%
other/undeclared	1	0.1%
Total	974	100%
