= Rodoč =

Suburb in Herzegovina-Neretva

- Suburb
- Location within Bosnia and Herzegovina
- Coordinates: 43°18′46″N 17°48′52″E
- Country: Bosnia and Herzegovina
- Entity: Federation of Bosnia and Herzegovina
- Canton: Herzegovina-Neretva
- Municipality: City of Mostar

Area
  - Total: 4.43 sq mi (11.48 km^{2})

Population (2013)
  - Total: 3,257
  - Density: 734.8/sq mi (283.7/km^{2})
- Time zone: UTC+1 (CET)
  - Summer (DST): UTC+2 (CEST)
- Postal code: 88000

Rodoč is a populated settlement in the Mostar municipality, just south of the city of Mostar, making it a suburb. It is 5 km (3.1 mi) from Mostar, 139 km (86 mi) from Sarajevo, 139 km (86 mi) from Dubrovnik and 157 km (98 mi) from Split.

== History ==
During the Bosnian War of the 1990s, Serb forces temporally occupied the southern parts of the city of Mostar, including Rodoč. They burned down about 80% of the houses. Many people were either killed or taken to camps, predominantly in Bileća or in Montenegro. For the tortures in the camps located in Montenegro couple of people were prosecuted as war criminals in Montenegro. After the liberation of the southern parts of the city and Rodoč, many people returned to their homes.

Between 1992 and 1994, the settlement was the site of the Heliodrom camp, which was operated by the Croatian Defence Council, the military arm of the Croatian Republic of Herzeg-Bosnia, and used to detain Bosniak and Bosnian Serb civilians. Seventy-seven detainees lost their lives at the camp over the course of its existence.

== Demographics ==
According to the 2013 census, its population was 3,257.

Ethnicity in 2013
Ethnicity	Number	Percentage
Croats	2,898	89.0%
Bosniaks	252	7.7%
Serbs	35	1.1%
other/undeclared	72	2.2%
Total	3,257	100%

== Sports ==
Local football club HNK Branitelj play their home games at the Stadion Sportskog Centra.
