= Široki Brijeg =

- City
- Grad Široki Brijeg; City of Široki Brijeg
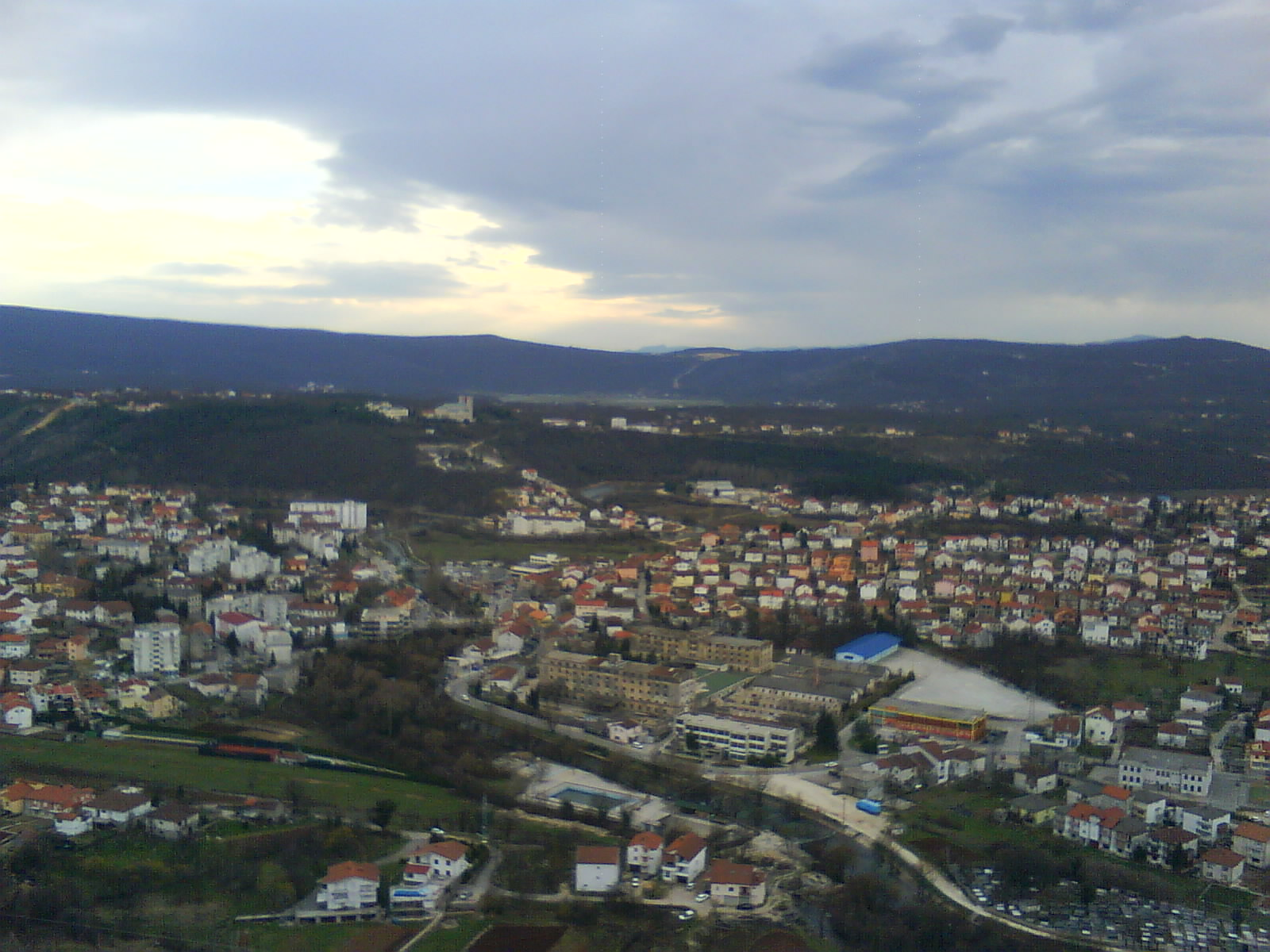
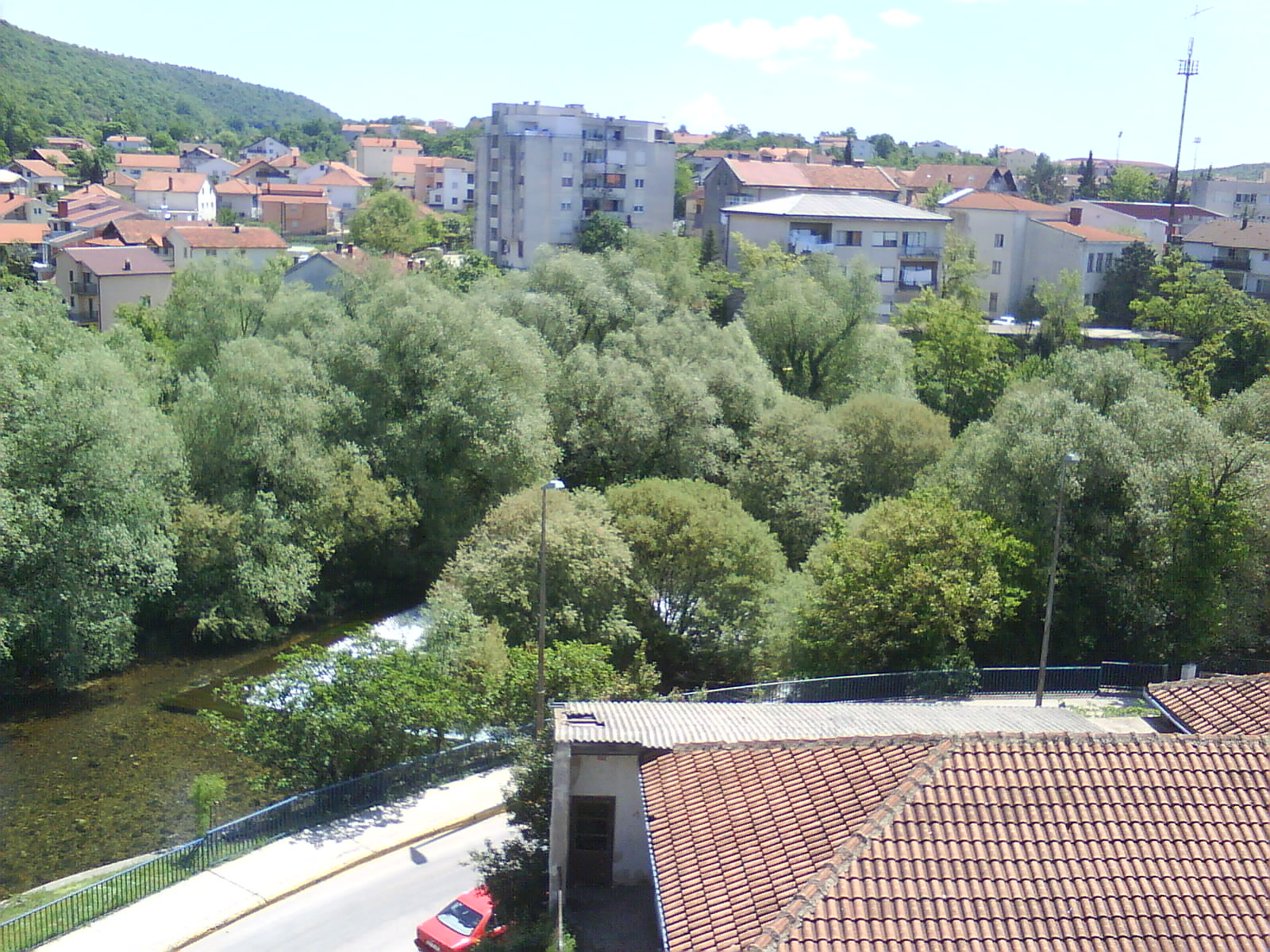
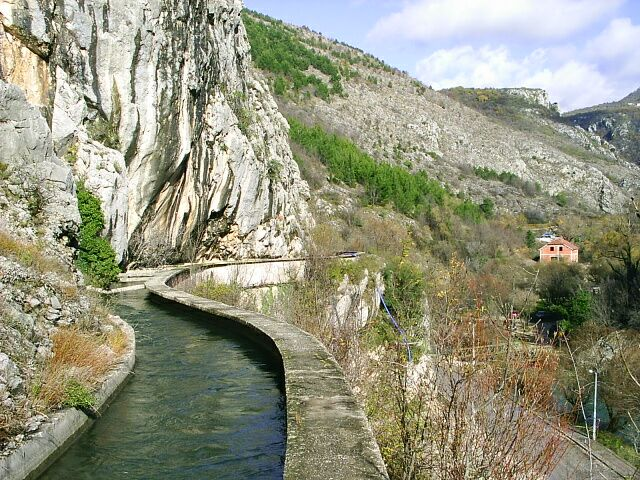
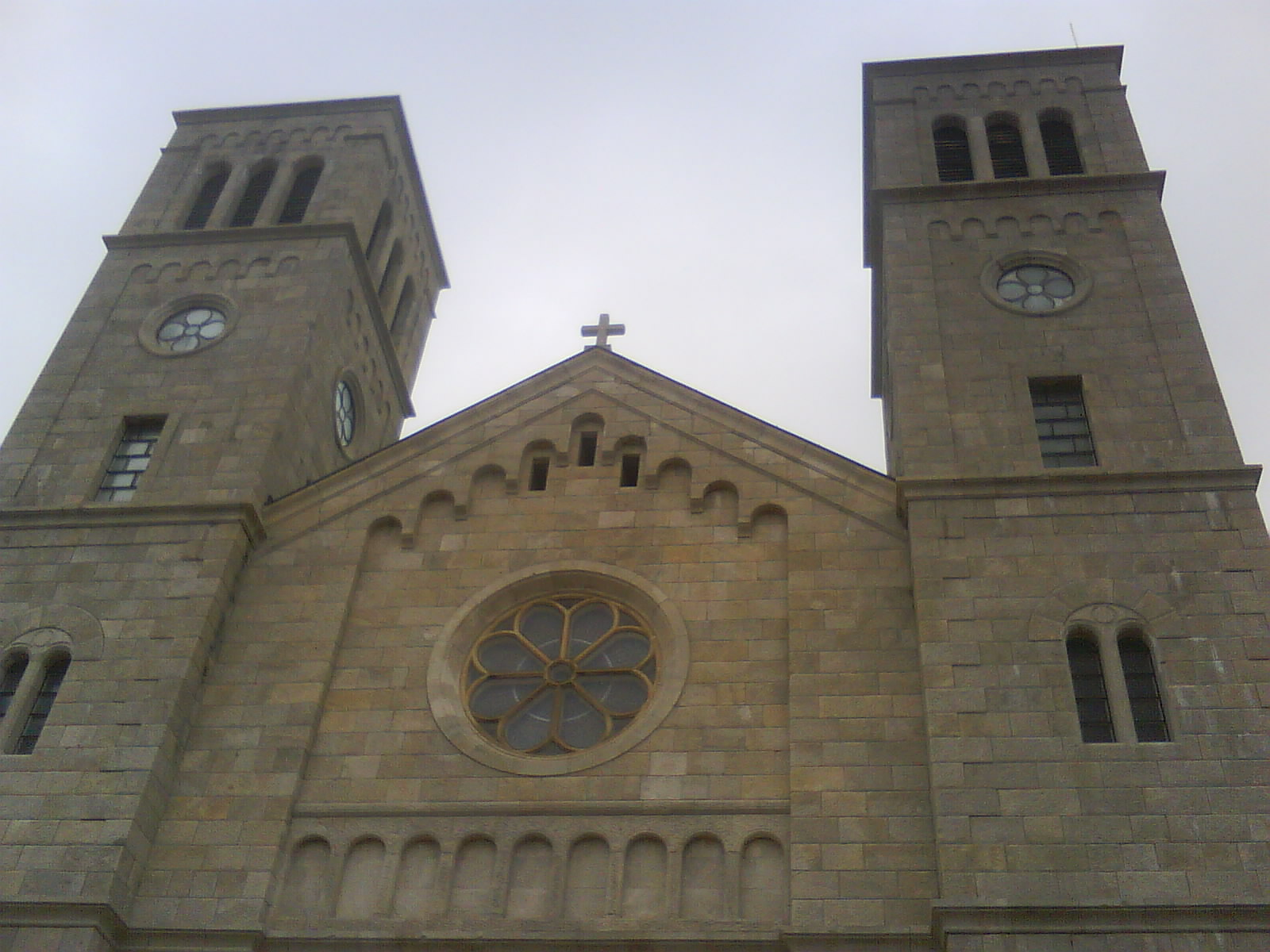
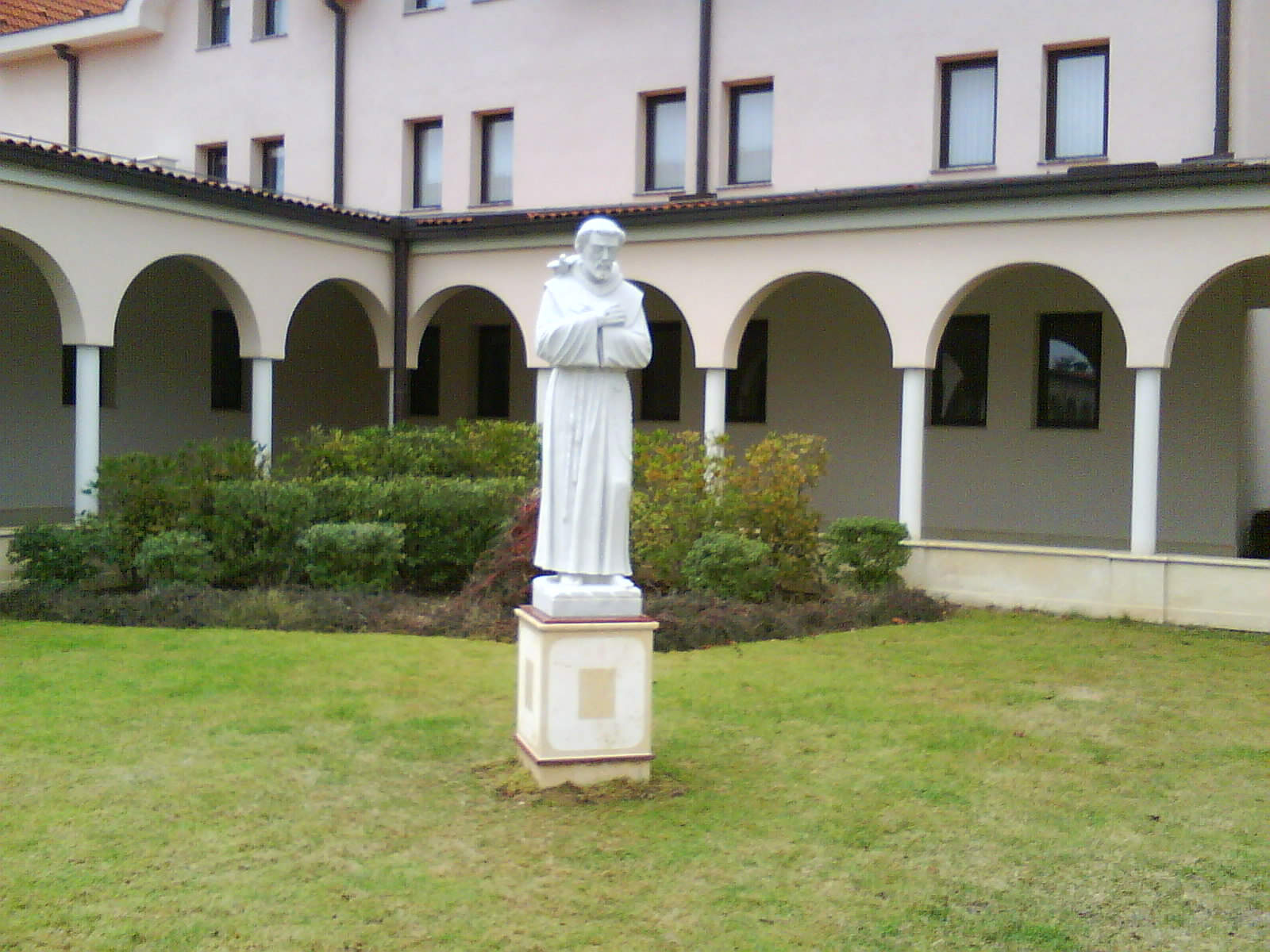
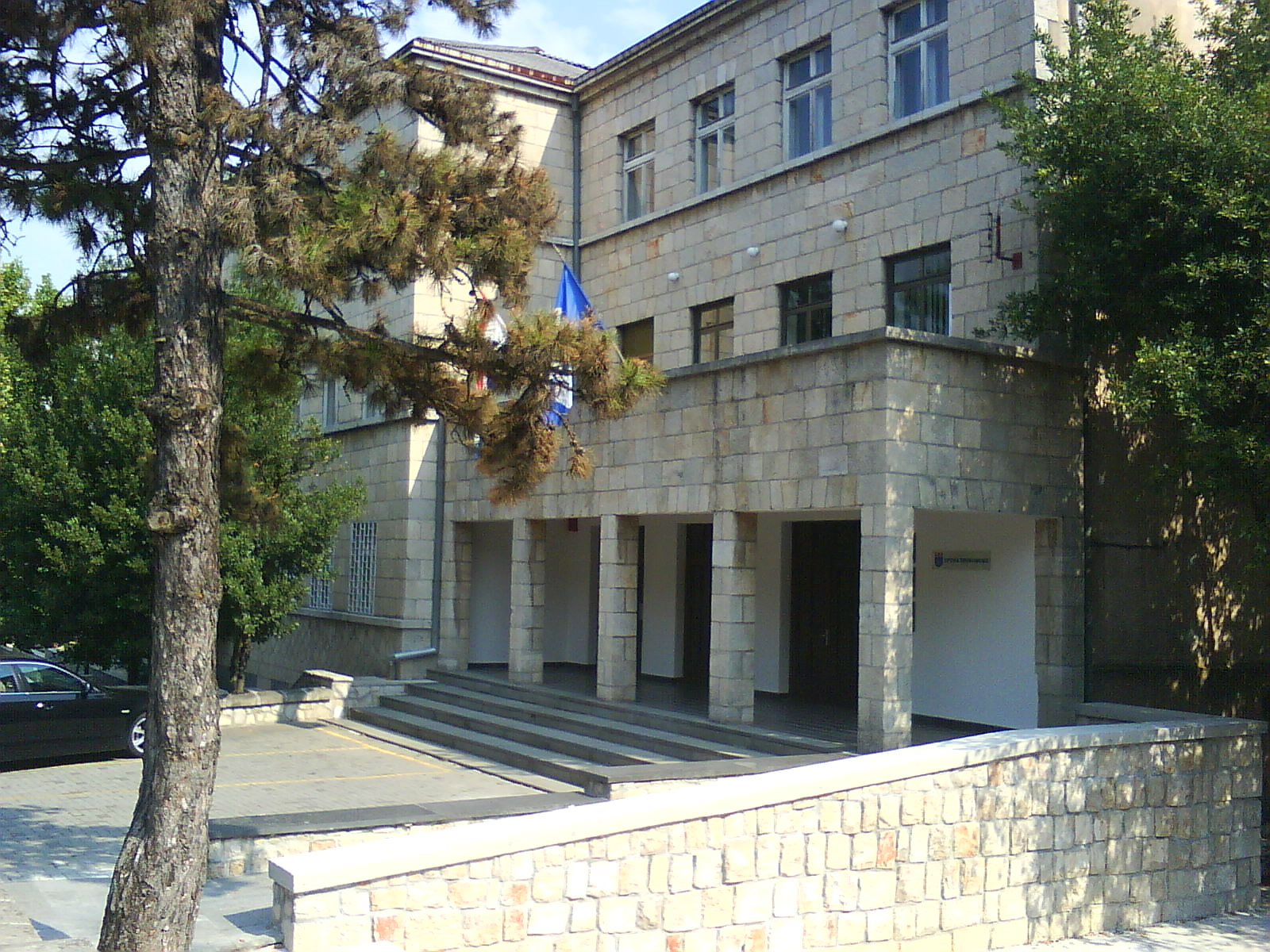
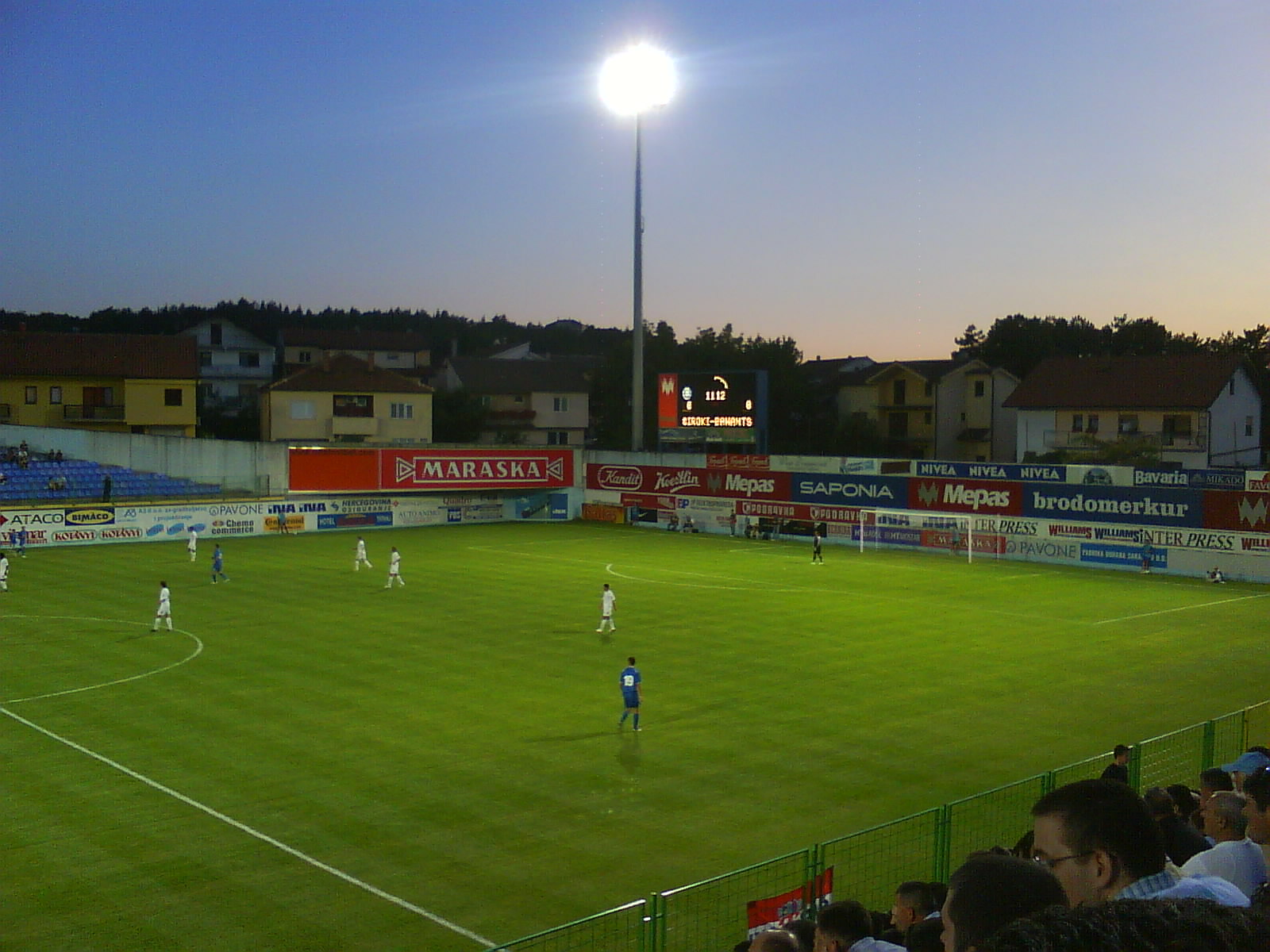
- Široki Brijeg

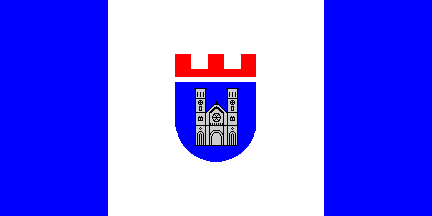
- Flag Coat of arms
- Etymology: Croatian: široki brijeg, lit. 'wide hill'
- Location of Široki Brijeg in Bosnia and Herzegovina

- Location within Bosnia and Herzegovina
- Coordinates: 43°22′59.31″N 17°35′33.86″E
- Country: Bosnia and Herzegovina
- Entity: Federation of Bosnia and Herzegovina
- Canton: West Herzegovina
- Geographical region: Herzegovina

Government
  - Mayor: Ivo Pavković (HDZ BiH)

Area
  - City: 387.6 km^{2} (149.7 sq mi)
  - Land: 387.6 km^{2} (149.7 sq mi)
  - Water: 0 km^{2} (0 sq mi)
- Elevation: 312 m (1,024 ft)

Population (2013)
  - City: 28,929
  - Density: 74.64/km^{2} (193.3/sq mi)
  - Urban: 6,149
  - Rural: 22,780
- Time zone: UTC+1 (CET)
  - Summer (DST): UTC+2 (CEST)
- Post code: 88220
- Area code: +387 039
- Website: www.sirokibrijeg.ba

Široki Brijeg is a city and the regional capital of West Herzegovina Canton of the Federation of Bosnia and Herzegovina, an entity of Bosnia and Herzegovina. As of 2013, the town itself had a population of 6,149 while the municipality had 28,929.

== Name ==
Široki Brijeg means 'wide hill' in Croatian. It is sometimes called Široki Brig or Široki ('wide'). From 1952 until October 16, 1992, the town was officially called Lištica after the Lištica river, which runs through it.

== Geography ==
The town is 20–25 km (12–16 mi) from Mostar, 29 km (18 mi) from Međugorje, and 88 km (55 mi) from the Adriatic coast (Ploče).

The Široki Brijeg Municipality's population numbers around 30,000 people, and the town itself has about 13,000 inhabitants. The area of the municipality amounts to 1,168 ha (2,886 acres; 5 sq mi). The center of town is at 270 m (886 ft) above sea level; this area is known as "lower Herzegovina". Almost the entire northern part of the municipality belongs to "high Herzegovina", with the highest point being the Bile stine ("White Rocks") near Donji Crnač.

=== Climate ===
Široki Brijeg has a mild humid subtropical climate (Köppen climate classification:Cfa). As such, winters average just above freezing, and are often cold. Summers are warm to mildly hot.

Climate data for Široki Brijeg
Month	Jan	Feb	Mar	Apr	May	Jun	Jul	Aug	Sep	Oct	Nov	Dec	Year
Daily mean °C (°F)	3.9 (39.0)	5.2 (41.4)	8.1 (46.6)	12.3 (54.1)	16.9 (62.4)	20.8 (69.4)	23.3 (73.9)	23.4 (74.1)	18.7 (65.7)	14.1 (57.4)	9.4 (48.9)	4.9 (40.8)	13.4 (56.1)
Average precipitation mm (inches)	125.7 (4.95)	116.7 (4.59)	97.5 (3.84)	105.2 (4.14)	91.6 (3.61)	71.4 (2.81)	57.1 (2.25)	58.5 (2.30)	124.1 (4.89)	123.2 (4.85)	182.8 (7.20)	179.3 (7.06)	1,333.1 (52.49)
Average rainy days	9	8	9	11	11	9	7	5	7	8	10	10	104
Average relative humidity (%)	78	75	73	70	70	66	59	57	67	76	79	79	71
Source 1: Climate Charts(temperatures-precipitation 1993–2022)
Source 2: Climate data (humidity-rainy days 1991–2021)

=== Terrain ===
The wider area of the municipality of Široki Brijeg is located on the characteristic, complex structural forms known as the "high karst zone" in geological terms. The basic characteristic is the rocky limestone relief in various karst forms (sinks, caves, sinkholes, karst fields, etc.) and deeply cut valleys with occasional water flows. The Široki Brijeg area is located on the direction of tectonic units Rakitno-Hrgud and spreads over Rakitno, Vardi mountains, Mostarsko Blato, Rotimlje and Hrgud to Trebišnjica in the southeast. The area is made-up of up late Jurassic sediments, followed by Cretaceous and Paleogene age layers, then Neogene and Quaternary deposits. Highlights are early Cretaceous dun, well-stratified limestone and dolomites. Late Cretaceous deposits, cenoman-turon, are represented by white and pink, massive limestone with the shoot. In Paleogene layers function Liburnijska and alveolinic-nummulitic limestones, then eocenic flysch, which is represented by marl, sandstone, calcarenite and conglomerates.

Neogenic layers are built of marl, sandy clay, sandstone and conglomerates, and can be found in the vicinity of Grabovo Drage and Mostarsko Blato. Quaternary pebbles, sand and water karst banks are found on almost all rocky fields and drift along the river beds. Between the lower mountain Vardi, Gvozd, Rujan and Trtle (altitude 600–900m) is a karstic depression Kočerinsko, Trnsko, Mokarsko and Ruževo field and Mostar Blato (altitude of 220–300m). The Široki Brijeg area belongs to typical bauxite courts, Lokve Black - Kidačke Njive, Resnica - deposit and Uzarići - Knešpolje. This area was devastated by landfills and tailings, and rehabilitation requirements.

=== Waters ===
The water from the municipality of Široki Brijeg belongs to the basin of the Neretva river-the main surface currents towards Mostar, Blato, the ticket with Ugrovača, Mokašnica, Crnašnica and Žvatić. The river belongs to Lištica of surface waters Čabulje, who bujični aquifer Brinje collected from Ladin and Dobrinja. Brinje whose rudiments north of Bogodola, below Kulic (1199) runs to the west and on its way to Lištica receives at the Prskalo stream Ladin, and 2.5 kilometers below, the stream of water Dobrinski. These streams buy all surface waters during the period of abundant precipitation and dissolution of snow on the southwestern parts of the mountain Čabulje.

Surface waters that come to Rakitno field are dried by water points Jelica and Zmijinac, and during major precipitation formed a periodic watercourse Ugrovača that deeply carved Brin canyon, receiving side stream, and in the village of Trn, Kočerin water fields, and on the road to Blato Mostarskog, in Siroki Brijeg center connects with the Lištica.

== History ==
=== Ancient period ===
The ruins from the Illyrian period confirm that the area of Široki Brijeg had a large population in pre-historic times. The evidence can be seen on the hill Gradina on the frontier of Mokro and Čerigaj. There is also evidence on the walls of the forts where they had been in past. During the ancient period there was plenty of life in that region. From the Roman period there are remains of a fort (refugium) in the village of Biograci and a basilica in Mokro; there are remains of the forts and roads there.

=== Middle ages ===
Emperor Constantine VII Porphyrogennetos mentions that Mokriskik was in that area. The basilica in Mokri was built and destroyed several times in the Middle Ages and it was used for its purpose. In her neighbourhood is nekrepola with stećak, which are present elsewhere. There number and size indicate that this region was (from 12th till 15th century) has been very populated and rich. From that period on Kočerin was kept the longest tablet on stećak written with Bosnian Cyrillic, known as Kočerinska ploča („Kočerin tablet"). The residues of middle-age fort can be found in the Bork, close to the source of river Lištica.

=== Ottoman rule ===
After the Turkish conquest in the middle of 15th century the population was mainly rural and in the mountains. Until the middle of 19th century, Herzegovina was cut off from social, cultural and political events in other European countries.

=== World War II and Yugoslavia ===
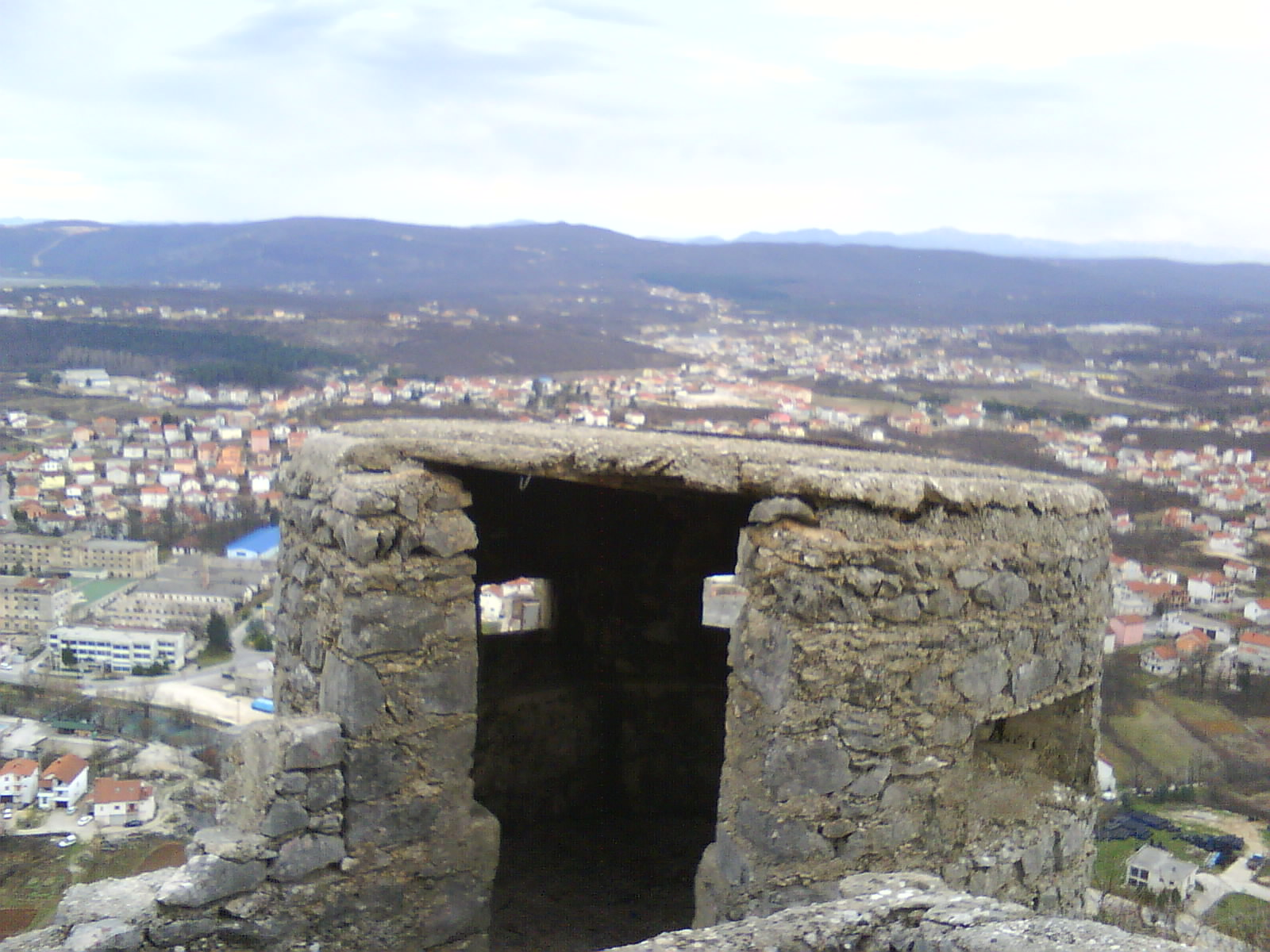
Italian fort above Široki Brijeg

During the Second World War the Ustaše held the city together with Italian troops. During their presence, the Italians built several forts for observation of the city. A number of prominent Ustaše officials, including Andrija Artuković were educated at the Široki Brijeg school and monastery.

Following the war, the town was renamed Lištica by the Yugoslav government after the river that runs through it. Investment in the city was also very poor. A number of people emigrated to Zagreb and Dalmatia, as well as to Germany as gastarbeiters.

In 1985, the local Communist Party built a monument to the Yugoslav Partisans in the centre of the town.

On 7 April 1992, during the first stages of the Bosnian War, the town was the target of an air raid carried out by the Yugoslav Air Force. Two aircraft that took off from Podgorica fired air-to-air rockets and dropped bombs on the town centre, killing six civilians.

== Settlements ==
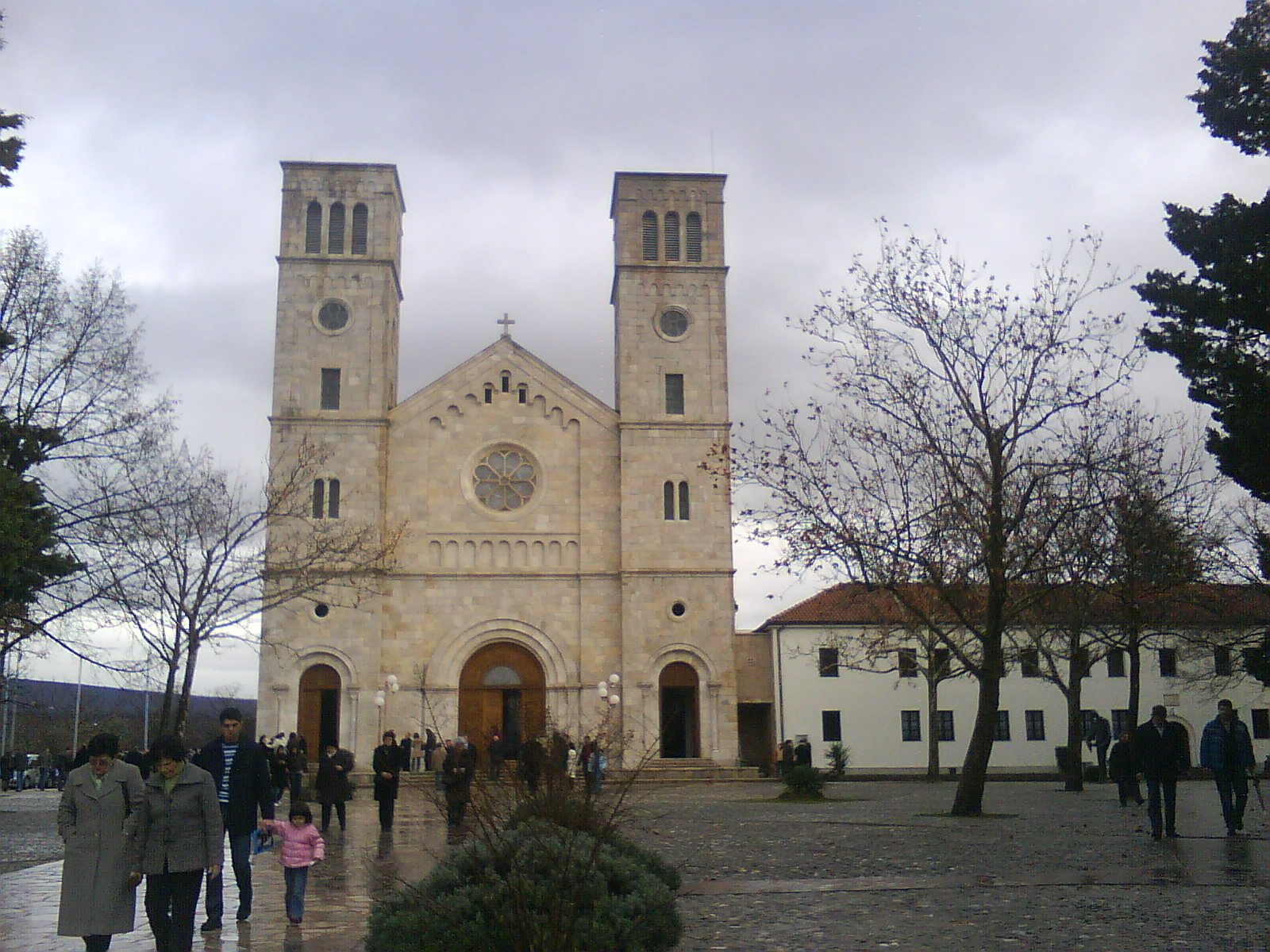
The Monastery, the symbol of the city

- Biograci
- Brig
- Buhovo
- Crne Lokve
- Čerigaj
- Dobrič
- Dobrkovići
- Doci
- Donja Britvica
- Donji Crnač
- Donji Gradac
- Dužice
- Gornja Britvica
- Gornji Crnač
- Gornji Mamići
- Grabova Draga
- Izbično
- Jare
- Knešpolje
- Kočerin
- Lise
- Ljubotići
- Ljuti Dolac
- Mokro
- Oklaji
- Podvranić
- Potkraj
- Privalj
- Rasno
- Rujan
- Široki Brijeg
- Trebišnica
- Trn
- Turčinovići
- Uzarići

== Economy ==
=== Agriculture ===
Agricultural production in the municipality of Široki Brijeg is mostly reduced to the production for their own use on yards and a minor part of the arable land. It is the production of agricultural products for the market is very small compared to the alternatives, and refers primarily to the production of wine, a little bit in the production of vegetables and flowers, very little in the livestock and milk production.

This resulted in a large percentage of agricultural land is not used- according to latest statistics - even 60% that could be used for agricultural land is not processed.

The lack of clear government strategy and orientation towards the launching and development of agricultural production is also very important feature of the present situation in agriculture .

==== Prior to the war ====
Unlike twenty years ago, is now in agricultural production there is no fundamental cultural production, production that would be meaningful and possible in a larger area of the municipality. For many years it was tobacco. Together with the war has fallen down and the existing state system and thus the former system of organization of agricultural production. In the entire period since then until today, the new system was established.

It is the country, especially the area where the municipality brought uncontrolled import all kinds of things, so the majority of agricultural products has become cheaper to import than produce.

The result has already been mentioned drastically reducing obrađivanih area, reducing the number of cattle and even up to five times, the entire reduction in volume of agricultural production. Finally it came to life the feeling that it is impossible to engage in agricultural production as the production activity of which can be live or something and make money.

==== After the war ====
The municipality's overall economic performance is stronger than that of the surrounding municipalities - primarily in the Entrepreneurial Sector, and the time orientation and working-age population by non-sector higher. Therefore, the percentage of uncultivated land is the largest in the municipality in comparison to the surrounding ones- 60% (Posušje 59%, 49% Ljubuški and Grude 47%). The number of residents who are engaged solely in agriculture is relatively smallest in Siroki Brijeg.

== Industry ==
In the area of industrial production in the municipality are significantly represented meat industry and metal industry, and to a smaller production of footwear, manufacture of construction products and stone processing, production of insulation materials, graphic activity, etc.

Official statistics, which regularly publishes the Federal Bureau of Statistics tracked the movement of industrial production at the level of the Federation and cantons, so that these (official) data for the municipality does not have. However, the basic features of industrial production in this region in the West would be essentially similar and reflect the movement of industrial production for the municipality of Siroki Brijeg.

In the period 2004/2005 the recorded slight growth of the index of industrial production (101.3). When the production of metals and production of metal products recorded a significant growth (index 2005./2004. = 134.3 and 180.4), production of paper products (index = 110.7), while other areas of industrial production recorded a significant decrease ( such as food and beverages: Index = 80.0, mining: index = 71.4).

For further growth of industrial production are essential investments in the development of existing industrial capacity in the areas that are currently represented in the municipality and which employ a large number of workers. This primarily refers to the production of metals and metal products. These activities according to official statistics reported a continued growth during 2005 year. The establishment and construction of new or expansion of existing business and industrial zones is prerequisite for the growth of manufacturing sector, attract domestic and foreign capital and create new jobs.

== Sport ==
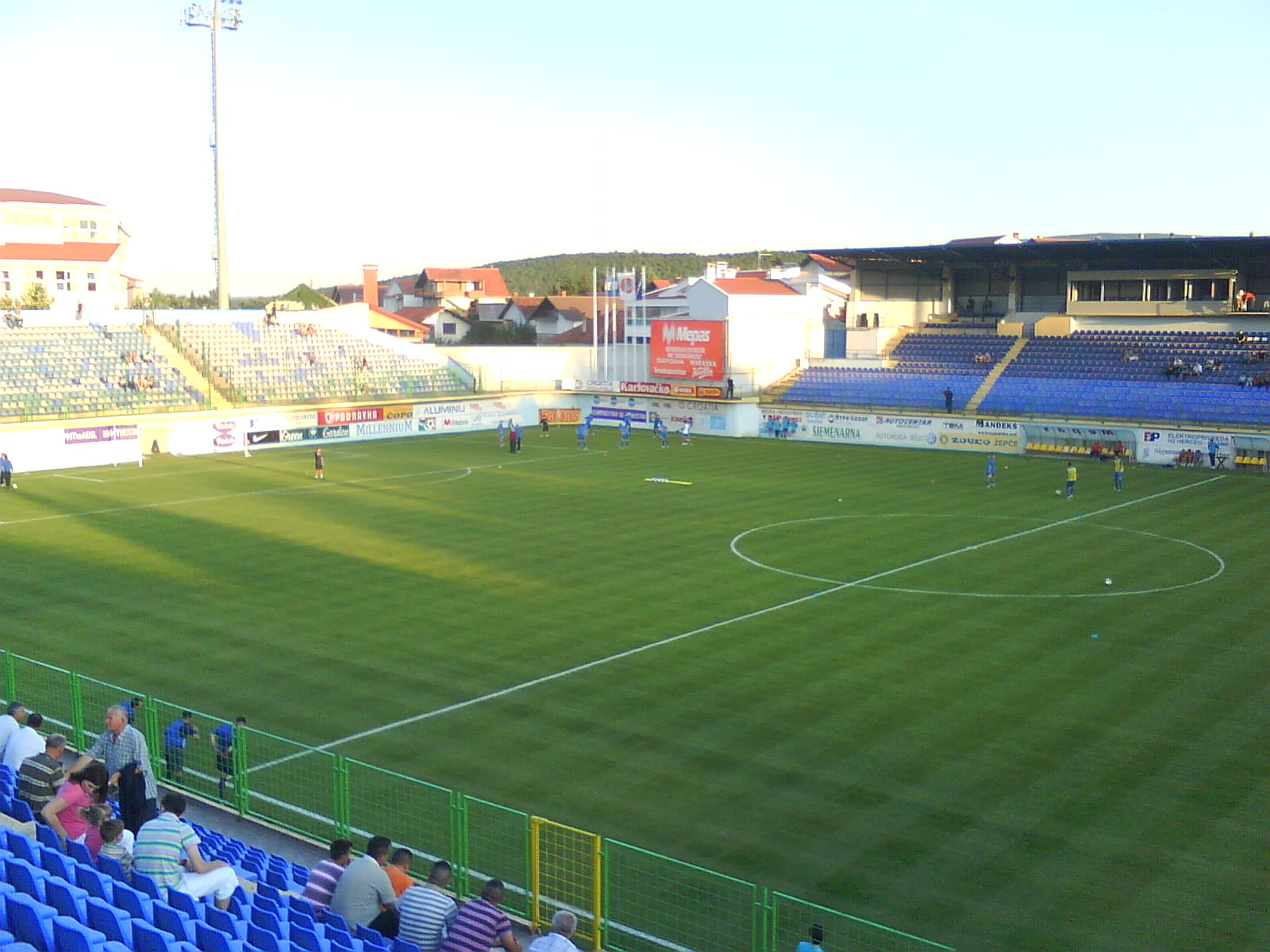
Pecara Stadium

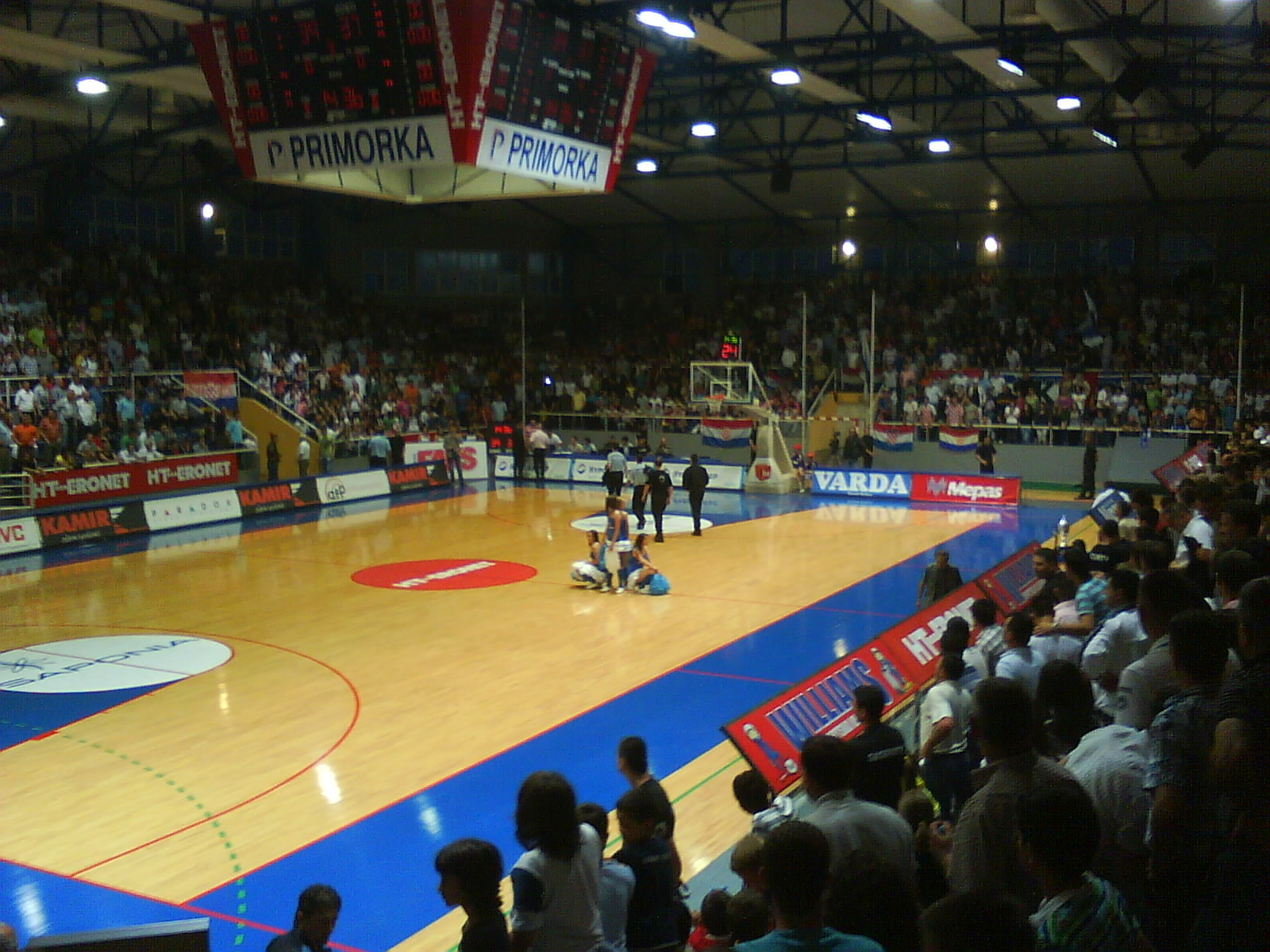
Pecara Sports Hall

The association football club NK Široki Brijeg, which was founded in 1948, is based in Široki Brijeg. NK Široki Brijeg plays its home games at the Pecara Stadium, which is one of only two stadiums in Bosnia and Herzegovina with an UEFA category 3 ranking. Pecara Stadium has a seating capacity of 7,000 individuals.

One of Bosnia and Herzegovina's most popular basketball clubs, HKK Široki, is also based in Široki Brijeg. HKK Široki, which has won eleven Bosnia and Herzegovina Championship titles and nine Basketball Cups of Bosnia and Herzegovina (Mirza Delibašić Cups)., plays their home games at the Pecara Sports Hall, which has a seating capacity of 4,500 people.

== Demographics ==
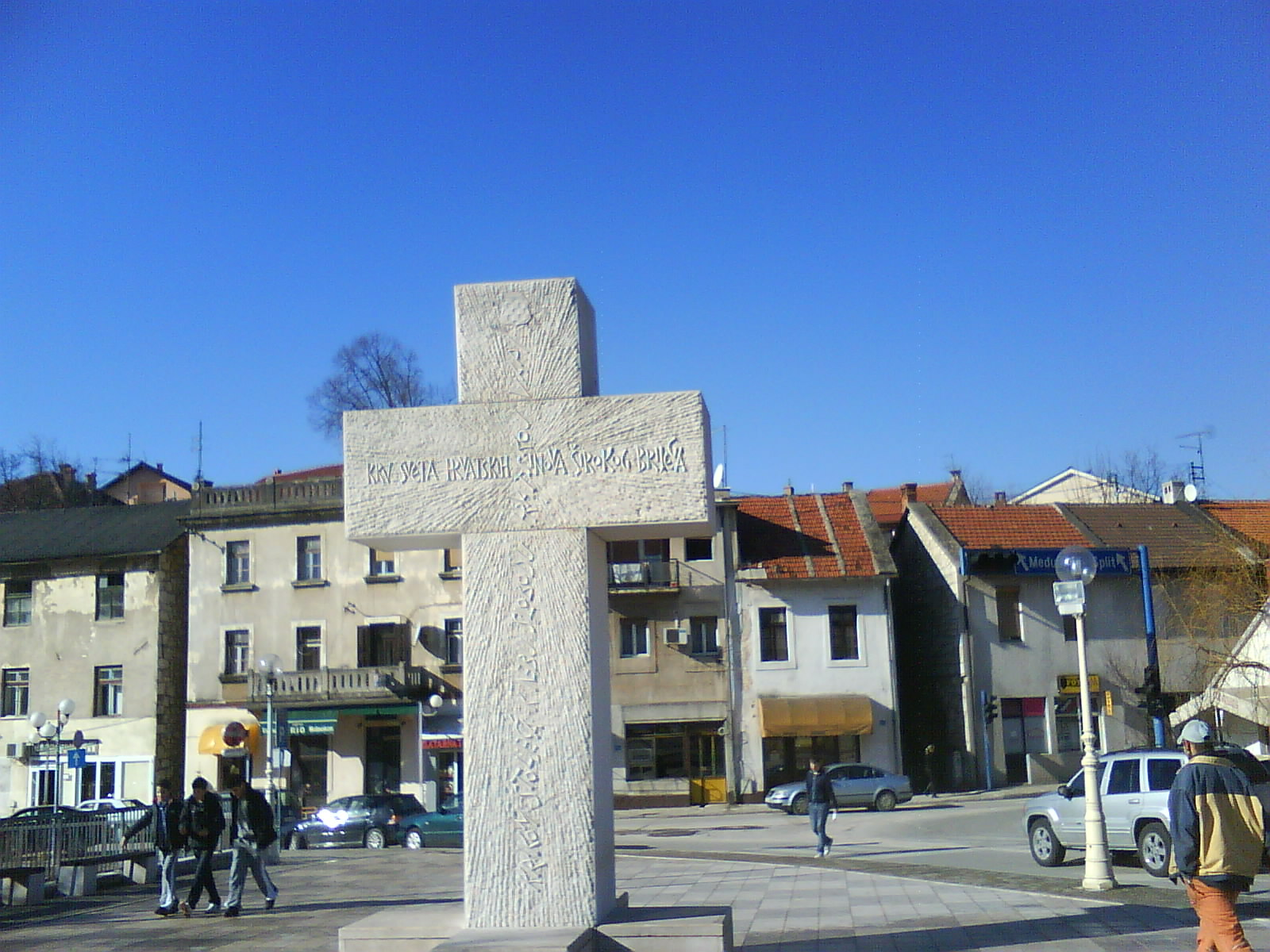
Cross in downtown, made by Anđelko Mikulić, 2000.

=== 1971 ===
27,285 total

- Croats - 26,940 (98.73%)
- Others - 345 (1.27%)

=== 1991 ===
In the 1991 census, the municipality of Široki Brijeg had 26,437 inhabitants:

- 26,231 Croats (99.2%)
- 206 others (0.8%).

The town itself had 6,864 inhabitants, 99.37% being Croats.

=== 2013 ===
In the 2013 census, the municipality of Široki Brijeg had 28,929 inhabitants:

- 28,814 Croats (99.6%)
- 115 others (0.4%).

== Twin towns – sister cities ==
Široki Brijeg is twinned with:

- Vinkovci, Croatia

== Notable people ==
- Mario Bazina, football player
- Ivan Mikulić, singer (representing Croatia in 2004 Eurovision Song Contest)
- Gojko Šušak, former Minister of Defence of Croatia
- Goran Bogdan, actor
