= List of settlements in the Federation of Bosnia and Herzegovina/S =

== Sa ==
Sabljari Bugojno, Sadovače Vitez (BiH), Sandžak Donji Vakuf, Sanski Most, Sažići Travnik,

== Se ==
Seoca, Seonica, Sebešić Novi Travnik, Sečevo Travnik, Sedlari, Seferi Travnik, Seferovići Bugojno, Seferovići Uskoplje, Selići Travnik, Selakovići Fojnica, Selište Fojnica, Selište Jajce, Selište (municipality Mostar), Seljani, Semin Donji Vakuf, Seoci Jajce, Seoci Uskoplje, Seona Novi Travnik, Servani Bugojno

== Si ==
Sijedac, Silajdževina Donji Vakuf, Sitišće Fojnica, Sitnik, Sivrino Selo Vitez (BiH)

== Sj ==
Sjekose

== Sk ==
Skrobućani (municipality Prozor-Rama), Skravnik, Skrte Bugojno, Skomorje Travnik, Skradno Busovača

== Sl ==
Slatina, Slatina, Slatina Donji Vakuf, Slavičići, Slavkovići, Slavogostići (municipality Ravno), Slimena Travnik, Slipčevići Dobretići, Slipčići (municipality Mostar), Slivnica Bobani (municipality Ravno), Slivnica Površ (municipality Ravno), Služanj

== Sm ==
Smajlovići Fojnica, Smionica Jajce, Smrčevice Uskoplje

== So ==
Sofići, Sokolina Donji Vakuf, Solakova Kula, Solakovići Busovača, Solakovići Kiseljak, Sopot, Sopotnica, Sorlaci (part), Sovići, Sovići (municipality Mostar)

== Sp ==
Spahovići, Sparožići (municipality Ravno), Spiljani

== Sr ==
Srebrenik, Sretnice (municipality Mostar)

== St ==
Stanojevići, Stolac (Herzegovina-Neretva Canton), Stare Kuće Jajce, Staro Selo Donji Vakuf, Stojčići Kreševo, Stojići Bugojno, Stojkovići, Stojkovići Novi Travnik, Stojkovići Kiseljak, Stojkovići, Stolac Bugojno, Strane Busovača, Strgonice, Striževo (municipality Mostar), Struge, Stubica Busovača, Studenčica

== Su ==
Suhi Dol Travnik, Suhodol Donji Vakuf, Sultanovići Donji Vakuf, Sultići, Surovi

== Sv ==
Svijenča Svitava, Svilići Uskoplje, Svinjarevo Kiseljak
