= List of settlements in the Federation of Bosnia and Herzegovina/G =

List of settlements in the Federation of Bosnia and Herzegovina - G
Settlement	City or municipality	Canton
Gabela	Čapljina	Herzegovina-Neretva Canton
Gaćice	Vitez	Central Bosnia Canton
Gaj	Goražde	Bosnian Podrinje Canton
Gaj	Uskoplje	Central Bosnia Canton
Gajevi	Ilijaš	Sarajevo Canton
Gajine	Ilijaš	Sarajevo Canton
Gakići	Konjic	Herzegovina-Neretva Canton
Galečić	Tomislavgrad	Canton 10
Galičica	Uskoplje	Central Bosnia Canton
Galjevo	Konjic	Herzegovina-Neretva Canton
Garačići	Bugojno	Central Bosnia Canton
Garež	Vogošća	Sarajevo Canton
Garovci	Hadžići	Sarajevo Canton
Gladnik,	Travnik	Central Bosnia Canton
Glamoč	Glamoč	Canton 10
Glamoč	Goražde	Bosnian Podrinje Canton
Glavatičevo	Konjic	Herzegovina-Neretva Canton
Glavica	Glamoč	Canton 10
Glavice	Bugojno	Central Bosnia Canton
Glavska	Ravno	Herzegovina-Neretva Canton
Glodnica	Jablanica	Herzegovina-Neretva Canton
Glogošnica	Jablanica	Herzegovina-Neretva Canton
Gluha Bukovica	Travnik	Central Bosnia Canton
Gnjilišta	Čapljina	Herzegovina-Neretva Canton
Gobelovina	Konjic	Herzegovina-Neretva Canton
Gočela	Goražde	Bosnian Podrinje Canton
Godinja	Trnovo	Sarajevo Canton
Gojanovići	Ilijaš	Sarajevo Canton
Gojčevići	Goražde	Bosnian Podrinje Canton
Goleš	Travnik	Central Bosnia Canton
Golinjevo	Livno	Canton 10
Golo Brdo	Bugojno	Central Bosnia Canton
Golubinac	Ravno	Herzegovina-Neretva Canton
Gora	Vogošća	Sarajevo Canton
Gorani	Konjic	Herzegovina-Neretva Canton
Goransko Polje	Konjic	Herzegovina-Neretva Canton
Goravci	Kupres	Canton 10
Goražde	Goražde	Bosnian Podrinje Canton
Gorica	Čapljina	Herzegovina-Neretva Canton
Gorica	Grude	West Herzegovina Canton
Gorica	Konjic	Herzegovina-Neretva Canton
Gornja Bioča	Hadžići	Sarajevo Canton
Gornja Bioča	Ilijaš	Sarajevo Canton
Blatnica	Čitluk	
Gornja Brda	Goražde	Bosnian Podrinje Canton
Gornja Britvica	Široki Brijeg	West Herzegovina Canton
Gornja Bukvica	Goražde	Bosnian Podrinje Canton
Gornja Misoča	Ilijaš	Sarajevo Canton
Gornja Presjenica	Trnovo	Sarajevo Canton
Gornja Prisika	Tomislavgrad	Canton 10
Gornja Raštelica	Hadžići	Sarajevo Canton
Gornja Ričica	Uskoplje	Central Bosnia Canton
Gornja Trebeuša	Travnik	Central Bosnia Canton
Gornja Večeriska	Vitez	Central Bosnia Canton
Gornja Vratna Gora	Konjic	Herzegovina-Neretva Canton
Gornje Krčevine		
Gornje Mladice	Ilidža	Sarajevo Canton
Gornje Paprasko	Jablanica	Herzegovina-Neretva Canton
Gornje Peulje	Bosansko Grahovo	Canton 10
Gornje Ravno	Kupres	Canton 10
Gornje Višnjevice	Konjic	Herzegovina-Neretva Canton
Gornje Vukovsko	Kupres	Canton 10
Gornji Boganovci	Bugojno	Central Bosnia Canton
Gornji Bogovići	Goražde	Bosnian Podrinje Canton
Gornji Brišnik	Tomislavgrad	Canton 10
Gornji Crnač	Široki Brijeg	West Herzegovina Canton
Gornji Čažanj	Konjic	Herzegovina-Neretva Canton
Gornji Čevljanovići	Ilijaš	Sarajevo Canton
Gornji Gradac	Konjic	Herzegovina-Neretva Canton
Gornji Gradac	Široki Brijeg	West Herzegovina Canton
Gornji Kazanci	Bosansko Grahovo	Canton 10
Gornji Korićani	Travnik	Canton 10
Gornji Kovačići	Novo Sarajevo	Canton 10
Gornji Malovan	Kupres	Canton 10
Gornji Mamići	Široki Brijeg	West Herzegovina Canton
Gornji Mračaj	Uskoplje	Central Bosnia Canton
Gornji Nevizdraci	Konjic	Herzegovina-Neretva Canton
Gornji Rujani	Livno	Canton 10
Gornji Tiškovac	Drvar	Canton 10
Gornji Velešići	Novo Sarajevo	Sarajevo Canton
Gornji Zovik	Hadžići	Sarajevo Canton
Gorogaše	Ravno	Herzegovina-Neretva Canton
Goruša	Bugojno	Central Bosnia Canton
Gostovići	Konjic	Herzegovina-Neretva Canton
Govedovići	Trnovo	Sarajevo Canton
Grab	Ljubuški	West Herzegovina Canton
Grabova Draga	Široki Brijeg	West Herzegovina Canton
Grabovci	Konjic	Herzegovina-Neretva Canton
Grabovica	Tomislavgrad	Canton 10
Grabovik	Goražde	Bosnian Podrinje Canton
Grabovnik	Ljubuški	West Herzegovina Canton
Grabovina	Čapljina	Herzegovina-Neretva Canton
Gračanica	Bugojno	Central Bosnia Canton
Gračanica	Trnovo	Sarajevo Canton
Gradac	Goražde	Bosnian Podrinje Canton
Gradac	Hadžići	
Gradac	Posušje	West Herzegovina Canton
Gradačac	Gradačac	Tuzla Canton
Gradeljina	Konjic	Herzegovina-Neretva Canton
Gradina	Travnik	Central Bosnia Canton
Gradnići	Čitluk	Herzegovina-Neretva Canton
Gradska	Ljubuški	West Herzegovina Canton
Grahovčići	Travnik	Central Bosnia Canton
Grahovik	Travnik	Central Bosnia Canton
Grahovište	Vogošća	Sarajevo Canton
Grbavica I	Novo Sarajevo	Sarajevo Canton
Grbavica II	Novo Sarajevo	Sarajevo Canton
Grborezi	Livno	Canton 10
Grebci	Ravno	Herzegovina-Neretva Canton
Greda	Ljubuški	
Gredine	Bugojno	Central Bosnia Canton
Grgići	Bugojno	Central Bosnia Canton
Grivići	Hadžići	Sarajevo Canton
Grljevići		
Grgurići	Livno	Canton 10
Grkovci	Bosansko Grahovo	Canton 10
Grnica	Uskoplje	Central Bosnia Canton
Gruborski Naslon	Drvar	Canton 10
Grude	Grude	West Herzegovina Canton
Grude	Hadžići	Sarajevo Canton
Grušča	Konjic	Herzegovina-Neretva Canton
Gubin	Livno	Canton 10
Guča Gora	Travnik	
Gunjačići	Goražde	Bosnian Podrinje Canton
Gunjevići	Goražde	Bosnian Podrinje Canton
Gusići	Goražde	Bosnian Podrinje Canton
Guskovići	Goražde	Bosnian Podrinje Canton
