= List of settlements in the Federation of Bosnia and Herzegovina/Č =

List of settlements in the Federation of Bosnia and Herzegovina - Č
Settlement	City or municipality	Canton
Čaić	Livno	Canton 10
Čakići	Novi Travnik	Central Bosnia Canton
Čalići		
Čapljina	Čapljina	Herzegovina-Neretva Canton
Čaprazlije	Livno	Canton 10
Čardaci	Bugojno	Central Bosnia Canton
Čaušlije	Bugojno	Central Bosnia Canton
Čavaš	Ravno	Herzegovina-Neretva Canton
Čavići	Bugojno	Central Bosnia Canton
Čehari		
Čehova	Novi Travnik	Central Bosnia Canton
Čelebić	Livno	Canton 10
Čelebići	Konjic	Herzegovina-Neretva Canton
Čelina	Konjic	Herzegovina-Neretva Canton
Čeljevo	Čapljina	
Čerigaj	Široki Brijeg	
Čerin	Čitluk	
Čičevo		
Čifluk	Travnik	Central Bosnia Canton
Čitluk	Čitluk	
Čitluk	Goražde	
Čitluk	Posušje	
Čivelj		
Čopice	Ravno	Herzegovina-Neretva Canton
Čosići	Travnik	Central Bosnia Canton
Čovčići		
Čuhovići		
Čukle	Travnik	Central Bosnia Canton
Čuklić	Livno	Canton 10
Čurovi		
Čvaljina	Ravno	Herzegovina-Neretva Canton
