= Popovo (župa) =

Medieval župa in what is now Bosnia and Herzegovina

Coordinates: 42.8749577°N 17.9846191°E

In the Middle Ages, most of the territory of the Popovo field by the Trebišnjica was part of the župa of Popovo ([pɔ̌pɔʋɔ]), and was part of the Hum province and form at least 1322 Banate of Bosnia and later Bosnian Kingdom. It encompassed most of the tribal territories of Vlasi Bobani, Vlasi Žurovci, Vlasi Hrabreni and Vlasi Burmazi. On the north it encompassed parts of the Ljubinje area, where it bordered župas Dabar, Ljubinje, Ljubomir and Dubrava. On the south it bordered with Bosansko Primorje county, and Trebinje area with eponymous župa to the east, and Zažabalje to the west. The Bosansko Primorje county was later acquired by the Republic of Ragusa from Bosnian monarch, namely kings Tvrtko II and Ostoja, through sequence of purchase arrangements and contracts.

In the area of the Popovo župa, the most notable nobility were the Nikolići, and their subjects Brlići, Ivanovići and Krasomirići. The location of the main fortress, Popovski, has not yet been determined for sure, but according to Marko Vego its most likely location is probably somewhere in the vicinity of Zavala, where the cultural center of the region was. The most important settlements in the Popovo župa were Dračevo, Žakovo, Čvaljina, Velja Međa, Ravno, Orahov Do, Sedlari, Poljice, Golubinac, Drijenjani, Grepci, Vršće, Dubljani, Površ, Kotezi and Veličani. The main occupation of the inhabitants were agriculture and animal husbandry. The vicinity of Dubrovnik facilitated the enduring orientation of domestic labor in the coastal area.

== Bibliography ==
- Filipović, Milenko S.; Mićević, Ljubo (1959). Попово у Херзеговини: антропогеографски приказ/Popovo u Hercegovini. Научно друштво НР Босне и Херцеговине/Naučno društvo NR Bosne i Hercegovine.
