= List of settlements in the Federation of Bosnia and Herzegovina/T =

== Ta ==
Tasovčići

== Te ==
Tepčići, Teskera, Tešanj

== Ti ==
Tihaljina, Tinje

== To ==
Tošćanica (municipality Prozor-Rama), Tovarnica

== Tr ==
Travnik, Trebeševo, Trebimlja (municipality Ravno), Trebižat, Treboje, Trešnjevica, Trge, Tribistovo, Trijebanj (municipality Stolac(BiH)) Trn (Široki Brijeg), Trnčina (municipality Ravno), Trusina

== Tu ==
Tuhobići, Tupačići, Turbe, Turčinovići (Široki Brijeg), Turija, Tuzla
