= Bukve =

- Village
- Location within Bosnia and Herzegovina
- Coordinates: 44°11′10″N 17°47′24″E
- Country: Bosnia and Herzegovina
- Entity: Federation of Bosnia and Herzegovina
- Canton: Central Bosnia
- Municipality: Vitez

Area
  - Total: 1.21 sq mi (3.14 km^{2})

Population (2013)
  - Total: 210
  - Density: 170/sq mi (67/km^{2})
- Time zone: UTC+1 (CET)
  - Summer (DST): UTC+2 (CEST)

Bukve is a village in the municipality of Vitez, Bosnia and Herzegovina.

== Demographics ==
According to the 2013 census, its population was 210.

Ethnicity in 2013
Ethnicity	Number	Percentage
Bosniaks	206	98.1%
Croats	4	1.9%
Total	210	100%
