= Tolovići =

- Village
- Location within Bosnia and Herzegovina
- Coordinates: 44.1740776°N 17.8158189°E
- Country: Bosnia and Herzegovina
- Entity: Federation of Bosnia and Herzegovina
- Canton: Central Bosnia
- Municipality: Vitez

Area
  - Total: 0.98 sq mi (2.55 km^{2})

Population (2013)
  - Total: 145
  - Density: 147/sq mi (56.9/km^{2})
- Time zone: UTC+1 (CET)
  - Summer (DST): UTC+2 (CEST)

Tolovići is a village in the municipality of Vitez, Bosnia and Herzegovina.

== Demographics ==
According to the 2013 census, its population was 145.

Ethnicity in 2013
| Ethnicity | Number | Percentage |
|---|---|---|
| Bosniaks | 143 | 98.6% |
| Croats | 1 | 0.7% |
| Serbs | 1 | 0.7% |
| Total | 145 | 100% |
