= Dračevo =

Dračevo (Cyrillic script: Драчево) may refer to any of the following settlements within the former Yugoslavia:

- Dračevo, Čapljina - Bosnia and Herzegovina
- Dračevo, Trebinje - Bosnia and Herzegovina
- Dračevo, Skopje - Republic of North Macedonia
