= Ibrahim Duro =

Bosnian-Herzegovinian footballer

Personal information
- Date of birth: 26 April 1970 (age 56)
- Place of birth: Solakova Kula, SFR Yugoslavia
- Position: Midfielder

Youth career
- FK Sarajevo

Senior career*
Years	Team	Apps	(Gls)
1989–1990	FK Sarajevo		
1990–1992	Hajduk Split		
1992–1996	Šibenik	73	(6)
1996–1997	NK Zagreb	25	(4)
1997–1999	Maccabi Haifa	53	(7)
1999	Hapoel Kfar Saba	11	(0)
2000–2001	Maccabi Ahi Nazareth		
2001–2003	NK Zagreb	43	(2)
2003–2004	Rijeka	18	(1)
2004	Croatia Sesvete	2	(0)

International career
1995	Bosnia and Herzegovina	1	(0)
- * Club domestic league appearances and goals

Ibrahim Duro (born 26 April 1970) is a retired Bosnian-Herzegovinian footballer.

== Club career ==
Duro played for NK Zagreb and NK Rijeka in the Croatian Prva HNL.

Played in the Israeli premier league between 1997 and 2001, and was one of the key players in 1998–1999 season, when Maccabi Haifa achieved one of its best European achievements.

== International career ==
He made his debut in Bosnia and Herzegovina's first ever official international game, a November 1995 friendly match away against Albania, which remained his sole international appearance.
