= Mali Mošunj =

- Village
- Location within Bosnia and Herzegovina
- Coordinates: 44.1718502°N 17.7377676°E
- Country: Bosnia and Herzegovina
- Entity: Federation of Bosnia and Herzegovina
- Canton: Central Bosnia
- Municipality: Vitez

Area
  - Total: 1.21 sq mi (3.14 km^{2})

Population (2013)
  - Total: 769
  - Density: 634/sq mi (245/km^{2})
- Time zone: UTC+1 (CET)
  - Summer (DST): UTC+2 (CEST)

Mali Mošunj is a village in the municipality of Vitez, Bosnia and Herzegovina.

== Demographics ==
According to the 2013 census, its population was 769.

Ethnicity in 2013
Ethnicity	Number	Percentage
Croats	761	99.0%
Serbs	4	0.5%
Bosniaks	3	0.4%
other/undeclared	1	0.1%
Total	769	100%
