= Divjak, Vitez =

Divjak
- Village
- Location within Bosnia and Herzegovina
- Coordinates: 44.1649014°N 17.758766°E
- Country: Bosnia and Herzegovina
- Entity: Federation of Bosnia and Herzegovina
- Canton: Central Bosnia
- Municipality: Vitez

Area
  - Total: 0.75 sq mi (1.94 km^{2})

Population (2013)
  - Total: 1,369
  - Density: 1,830/sq mi (706/km^{2})
- Time zone: UTC+1 (CET)
  - Summer (DST): UTC+2 (CEST)

Divjak is a village in the municipality of Vitez, Bosnia and Herzegovina.

== Demographics ==
According to the 2013 census, its population was 1,369.

Ethnicity in 2013
| Ethnicity | Number | Percentage |
|---|---|---|
| Bosniaks | 741 | 54.1% |
| Croats | 606 | 44.3% |
| Serbs | 10 | 0.7% |
| other/undeclared | 12 | 0.9% |
| Total | 1,369 | 100% |
