= Vraniska =

- Village
- Location within Bosnia and Herzegovina
- Coordinates: 44.1332745°N 17.7978558°E
- Country: Bosnia and Herzegovina
- Entity: Federation of Bosnia and Herzegovina
- Canton: Central Bosnia
- Municipality: Vitez

Area
  - Total: 0.83 sq mi (2.16 km^{2})

Population (2013)
  - Total: 440
  - Density: 530/sq mi (200/km^{2})
- Time zone: UTC+1 (CET)
  - Summer (DST): UTC+2 (CEST)

Vraniska is a village in the municipality of Vitez, Bosnia and Herzegovina.

== Demographics ==
According to the 2013 census, its population was 440.

Ethnicity in 2013
Ethnicity	Number	Percentage
Bosniaks	436	99.1%
Croats	2	0.5%
other/undeclared	2	0.5%
Total	440	100%
