= Putkovići =

- Village
- Location within Bosnia and Herzegovina
- Coordinates: 44.1782078°N 17.7840769°E
- Country: Bosnia and Herzegovina
- Entity: Federation of Bosnia and Herzegovina
- Canton: Central Bosnia
- Municipality: Vitez

Area
  - Total: 0.30 sq mi (0.77 km^{2})

Population (2013)
  - Total: 105
  - Density: 350/sq mi (140/km^{2})
- Time zone: UTC+1 (CET)
  - Summer (DST): UTC+2 (CEST)

Putkovići is a village in the municipality of Vitez, Bosnia and Herzegovina.

== Demographics ==
According to the 2013 census, its population was 105.

Ethnicity in 2013
Ethnicity	Number	Percentage
Bosniaks	104	99.0%
Croats	1	1.0%
Total	105	100%
