= Lupac, Vitez =

Lupac
- Village
- Location within Bosnia and Herzegovina
- Coordinates: 44.1976974°N 17.8235189°E
- Country: Bosnia and Herzegovina
- Entity: Federation of Bosnia and Herzegovina
- Canton: Central Bosnia
- Municipality: Vitez

Area
  - Total: 0.59 sq mi (1.54 km^{2})

Population (2013)
  - Total: 476
  - Density: 801/sq mi (309/km^{2})
- Time zone: UTC+1 (CET)
  - Summer (DST): UTC+2 (CEST)

Lupac is a village in the municipality of Vitez, Bosnia and Herzegovina.

== Demographics ==
According to the 2013 census, its population was 476.

Ethnicity in 2013
Ethnicity	Number	Percentage
Bosniaks	467	98.1%
other/undeclared	9	1.9%
Total	476	100%
