= Baonine =

Baonine Баонине
- Village
- Location within Bosnia and Herzegovina
- Coordinates: 42°39′N 18°15′E
- Country: Bosnia and Herzegovina
- Entity: Republika Srpska; Federation of Bosnia and Herzegovina
- Canton: Herzegovina-Neretva
- Municipality: Trebinje; Ravno

Area
  - Total: 0.71 sq mi (1.84 km^{2})

Population (2013)
  - Total: 1
  - Density: 1.4/sq mi (0.54/km^{2})
- Time zone: UTC+1 (CET)
  - Summer (DST): UTC+2 (CEST)

Baonine (Serbian Cyrillic: Баонине) is a village in the municipality of Trebinje, Republika Srpska and partially in the municipality of Ravno, Bosnia and Herzegovina.

== Demographics ==
According to the 2013 census, its population was just 1, a Serb living in the Trebinje part.
