= Krtine =

- Village
- Location within Bosnia and Herzegovina
- Coordinates: 44.1727568°N 17.7858968°E
- Country: Bosnia and Herzegovina
- Entity: Federation of Bosnia and Herzegovina
- Canton: Central Bosnia
- Municipality: Vitez

Area
  - Total: 0.11 sq mi (0.28 km^{2})

Population (2013)
  - Total: 48
  - Density: 440/sq mi (170/km^{2})
- Time zone: UTC+1 (CET)
  - Summer (DST): UTC+2 (CEST)

Krtine is a village in the municipality of Vitez, Bosnia and Herzegovina.

== Demographics ==
According to the 2013 census, its population was 48, all Croats.
