= Donja Večeriska =

- Village
- Location within Bosnia and Herzegovina
- Coordinates: 44.1569752°N 17.751621°E
- Country: Bosnia and Herzegovina
- Entity: Federation of Bosnia and Herzegovina
- Canton: Central Bosnia
- Municipality: Vitez

Area
  - Total: 0.56 sq mi (1.46 km^{2})

Population (2013)
  - Total: 567
  - Density: 1,010/sq mi (388/km^{2})
- Time zone: UTC+1 (CET)
  - Summer (DST): UTC+2 (CEST)

Donja Večeriska is a village in the municipality of Vitez, Bosnia and Herzegovina.

== Demographics ==
According to the 2013 census, its population was 567.

Ethnicity in 2013
Ethnicity	Number	Percentage
Bosniaks	353	62.3%
Croats	211	37.2%
other/undeclared	3	0.5%
Total	567	100%
