= Ivan Milas (disambiguation) =

Ivan Milas (1939–2011) was a Croatian lawyer and politician.

Ivan Milas may also refer to:

- Ivan Milas (footballer) (born 1975), Croatian football player
- Ivan Milas (handballer) (born 1992), Bosnian-Herzegovinian handball player
