= Veliki Mošunj =

- Village
- Location within Bosnia and Herzegovina
- Coordinates: 44.1648027°N 17.73434°E
- Country: Bosnia and Herzegovina
- Entity: Federation of Bosnia and Herzegovina
- Canton: Central Bosnia
- Municipality: Vitez

Area
  - Total: 1.19 sq mi (3.09 km^{2})

Population (2013)
  - Total: 164
  - Density: 137/sq mi (53.1/km^{2})
- Time zone: UTC+1 (CET)
  - Summer (DST): UTC+2 (CEST)

Veliki Mošunj is a village in the municipality of Vitez, Bosnia and Herzegovina.

== Demographics ==
According to the 2013 census, its population was 164.

Ethnicity in 2013
Ethnicity	Number	Percentage
Croats	162	98.8%
Serbs	1	0.6%
other/undeclared	1	0.6%
Total	164	100%
