= Vrhovine, Vitez =

Vrhovine
- Village
- Location within Bosnia and Herzegovina
- Coordinates: 44.1679927°N 17.8420454°E
- Country: Bosnia and Herzegovina
- Entity: Federation of Bosnia and Herzegovina
- Canton: Central Bosnia
- Municipality: Vitez

Area
  - Total: 0.78 sq mi (2.03 km^{2})

Population (2013)
  - Total: 485
  - Density: 619/sq mi (239/km^{2})
- Time zone: UTC+1 (CET)
  - Summer (DST): UTC+2 (CEST)

Vrhovine is a village in the municipality of Vitez, Bosnia and Herzegovina.

== Demographics ==
According to the 2013 census, its population was 485.

Ethnicity in 2013
Ethnicity	Number	Percentage
Bosniaks	483	99.6%
other/undeclared	2	0.4%
Total	485	100%
