= Seferi =

Seferi is an Albanian surname. Notable people with the surname include:

- Idriz Seferi (1847–1927), Albanian nationalist figure and guerrilla fighter
- Nuri Seferi (born 1976), Albanian boxer
- Sefer Seferi (born 1979), Albanian boxer
- Taulant Seferi (born 1996), Albanian footballer
- Valmir Seferi (born 1993), Finnish footballer

== See also ==
- Seferi, Travnik, a village in Travnik, Bosnia and Herzegovina
