= Kijev Do massacre =

Kijev Dol killings
- Part of 1991 Yugoslav campaign in Croatia
- Location: Kijev Dol, Ravno municipality, Bosnia and Herzegovina
- Date: October 1991
- Target: Croat civilians
- Attack type: Mass killing
- Deaths: 8
- Perpetrators: Yugoslav People's Army and associated forces

On 13 November 1991, the hamlet of Kijev Do near Ravno, Bosnia and Herzegovina and the border with Croatia was attacked by units of the Yugoslav People's Army (JNA) and affiliated Serb forces. Eight elderly Croat civilians, seven women and one man, were killed in a targeted operation.

== Prelude ==
The Ravno massacre happened in early October 1991. The Yugoslav campaign in Croatia was ongoing, with the siege of Dubrovnik affecting several villages in the nearby area. The Croatian village of Slano, located about 9 kilometres (5.6 mi) to the southwest of Kijev Do, was attacked and occupied by the Yugoslav People's Army. This included a brigade from Nikšić, Montenegro, whose commander Sveto Ražnjatović was killed in that attack on 6 November.

On 7 November, a dozen residents of Kijev Do were apprehended under the charge of collaboration during World War II. They were taken to Trebinje and then to an internment camp near Bileća, where they were interrogated and abused. On the same day, a number of their houses in the village were set on the fire.

== Murders ==
The attack on Kijev Do had occurred over the course of roughly one hour, between 7 and 8 a.m. Eight elderly civilians were killed also seven women and one man. Most victims were at the home or in a neighboring house at the time. Families were reportedly targeted because they had the male members who were, or could have been, involved in Croatian armed units.

Victims were found in positions suggesting they tried to flee. Mara Dubelj was killed, while tending to pigs, and Mara Krkić's body was discovered seven months later in a well, with injuries indicating she had been dragged and possibly hanged. Following the attack, only four Croat residents survived, primarily because they had no male descendants. The homes were burned or abandoned, and the surviving population fled or was forcibly displaced.

The victims included: Božica Krkić (b. 1916), Bosa Krkić (b. 1907), Ivana Krkić (b. 1927), Manda Krkić (b. 1932), Miho Krkić (b. 1933), Mara Krkić (b. 1924), Mara Hapan (b. 1925), Mara Dubelj (b. 1906).

== Aftermath ==
Veselin Simović was indicted and tried for this crime at the Military Tribunal in Sarajevo and sentenced to 20 years in prison. Once the Yugoslav People's Army had evacuated from the Sarajevo over the course of the Bosnian War, he was transferred to Niš, where he fell ill and then died some time after the war.

The ICTY judgement against Pavle Strugar in 2005 referenced the civilian murders in Kijev Do for which Simović had been tried, as well as "about 68 indictments filed with the military court in Tivat, many of which dealt with looting and arson, and about 150 criminal reports for robbery" about soldiers from the Second Operational Group (2 OG) of the Yugoslav People's Army at this time in late 1991.
