= Vlaka, Ravno =

Vlaka Влака
- Village
- Location within Bosnia and Herzegovina
- Coordinates: 42°44′09″N 18°05′59″E
- Country: Bosnia and Herzegovina
- Entity: Federation of Bosnia and Herzegovina
- Canton: Herzegovina-Neretva
- Municipality: Ravno

Area
  - Total: 1.58 sq mi (4.10 km^{2})

Population (2013)
  - Total: 9
  - Density: 5.7/sq mi (2.2/km^{2})
- Time zone: UTC+1 (CET)
  - Summer (DST): UTC+2 (CEST)

Vlaka (Serbian Cyrillic: Влака) is a village in the municipality of Ravno, Herzegovina-Neretva Canton, Federation of Bosnia and Herzegovina, Bosnia and Herzegovina. Prior to the Bosnian war village belonged to the municipality Trebinje, which is now in the Republika Srpska.

== History ==
Until the signing of the Dayton Peace Agreement, the village was part of the then municipality of Trebinje, which became part of the Republika Srpska.

== Demographics ==
According to the 2013 census, its population was 9, all Serbs.
