= Belenići =

- Village
- Location within Bosnia and Herzegovina
- Coordinates: 42°49′N 18°00′E
- Country: Bosnia and Herzegovina
- Entity: Federation of Bosnia and Herzegovina
- Canton: Herzegovina-Neretva
- Municipality: Ravno

Area
  - Total: 3.33 sq mi (8.62 km^{2})

Population (2013)
  - Total: 137
  - Density: 41.2/sq mi (15.9/km^{2})
- Time zone: UTC+1 (CET)
  - Summer (DST): UTC+2 (CEST)

Belenići is a village in the municipality of Ravno, Bosnia and Herzegovina.In the 1991 census it had 12 inhabitants, all of them being Croats. Prior the war in Bosnia and Herzegovina it belonged to Trebinje municipality.

== Demographics ==
According to the 2013 census, its population was 137, all Croats.
