= Kijev Do =

- Village
- Interactive map of Kijev Do
- Location within Bosnia and Herzegovina
- Coordinates: 42°48′N 18°00′E
- Country: Bosnia and Herzegovina
- Entity: Federation of Bosnia and Herzegovina
- Canton: Herzegovina-Neretva
- Municipality: Ravno

Area
  - Total: 4.01 sq mi (10.39 km^{2})

Population (2013)
  - Total: 66
  - Density: 16/sq mi (6.4/km^{2})
- Time zone: UTC+1 (CET)
  - Summer (DST): UTC+2 (CEST)

Kijev Do is a village in the municipality of Ravno, Bosnia and Herzegovina.

In November 1991, the village was the site of the Kijev Do massacre.

== Demographics ==
According to the 2013 census, its population was 66.

Ethnicity in 2013
Ethnicity	Number	Percentage
Croats	54	81.8%
Serbs	12	18.1%
Total	66	100%
