= Sivrino Selo =

- Village
- Location within Bosnia and Herzegovina
- Coordinates: 44.1548674°N 17.8148875°E
- Country: Bosnia and Herzegovina
- Entity: Federation of Bosnia and Herzegovina
- Canton: Central Bosnia
- Municipality: Vitez

Area
  - Total: 0.27 sq mi (0.69 km^{2})

Population (2013)
  - Total: 370
  - Density: 1,400/sq mi (540/km^{2})
- Time zone: UTC+1 (CET)
  - Summer (DST): UTC+2 (CEST)

Sivrino Selo is a village in the municipality of Vitez, Bosnia and Herzegovina.

== Demographics ==
According to the 2013 census, its population was 370.

Ethnicity in 2013
Ethnicity	Number	Percentage
Bosniaks	225	60.8%
Croats	138	37.3%
Serbs	2	0.5%
other/undeclared	5	1.4%
Total	370	100%
