= Sadovače =

- Village
- Location within Bosnia and Herzegovina
- Coordinates: 44.1917461°N 17.7613624°E
- Country: Bosnia and Herzegovina
- Entity: Federation of Bosnia and Herzegovina
- Canton: Central Bosnia
- Municipality: Vitez

Area
  - Total: 0.49 sq mi (1.27 km^{2})

Population (2013)
  - Total: 412
  - Density: 840/sq mi (324/km^{2})
- Time zone: UTC+1 (CET)
  - Summer (DST): UTC+2 (CEST)

Sadovače is a village in the municipality of Vitez, Bosnia and Herzegovina.

== Demographics ==
According to the 2013 census, its population was 412.

Ethnicity in 2013
Ethnicity	Number	Percentage
Bosniaks	313	76.0%
Croats	97	23.5%
other/undeclared	2	0.5%
Total	412	100%
