= Bobovišta =

Bobovišta Бобовишта
- Village
- Location within Bosnia and Herzegovina
- Coordinates: 42°41′N 18°12′E
- Country: Bosnia and Herzegovina
- Entity: Federation of Bosnia and Herzegovina
- Canton: Herzegovina-Neretva
- Municipality: Ravno

Area
  - Total: 5.88 sq mi (15.22 km^{2})

Population (2013)
  - Total: 31
  - Density: 5.3/sq mi (2.0/km^{2})
- Time zone: UTC+1 (CET)
  - Summer (DST): UTC+2 (CEST)

Bobovišta (Serbian Cyrillic: Бобовишта) is a village in the municipality of Ravno, Bosnia and Herzegovina. Prior the war in Bosnia and Herzegovina it belonged to Trebinje municipality.

== Demographics ==
According to the 2013 census, its population was 31.

Ethnicity in 2013
| Ethnicity | Number | Percentage |
|---|---|---|
| Serbs | 30 | 96.8% |
| other/undeclared | 1 | 3.2% |
| Total | 31 | 100% |
