= Ivanica =

Village in Bosnia and Herzegovina

Ivanica Иваница
- Village
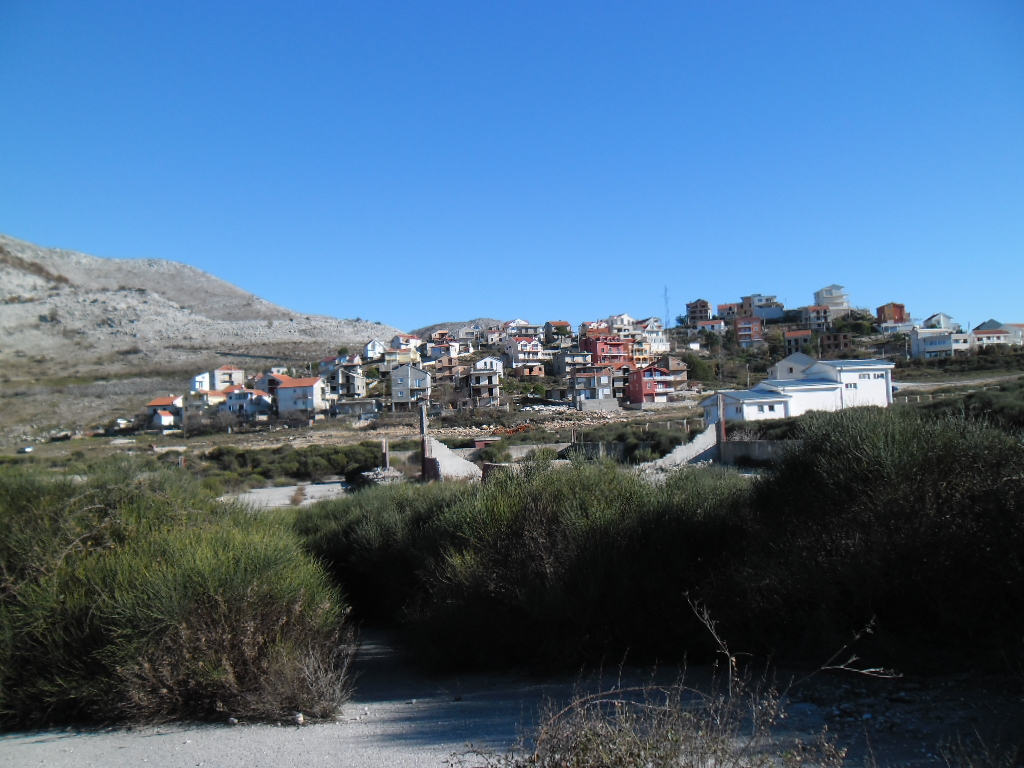
- Ivanica
- Interactive map of Ivanica
- Location within Bosnia and Herzegovina
- Coordinates: 42.6629°N 18.1628°E
- Country: Bosnia and Herzegovina
- Entity: Federation of Bosnia and Herzegovina
- Canton: Herzegovina-Neretva
- Municipality: Ravno

Area
  - Total: 0.47 km^{2} (0.18 sq mi)

Population (2013)
  - Total: 139
  - Density: 300/km^{2} (770/sq mi)
- Time zone: UTC+1 (CET)
  - Summer (DST): UTC+2 (CEST)

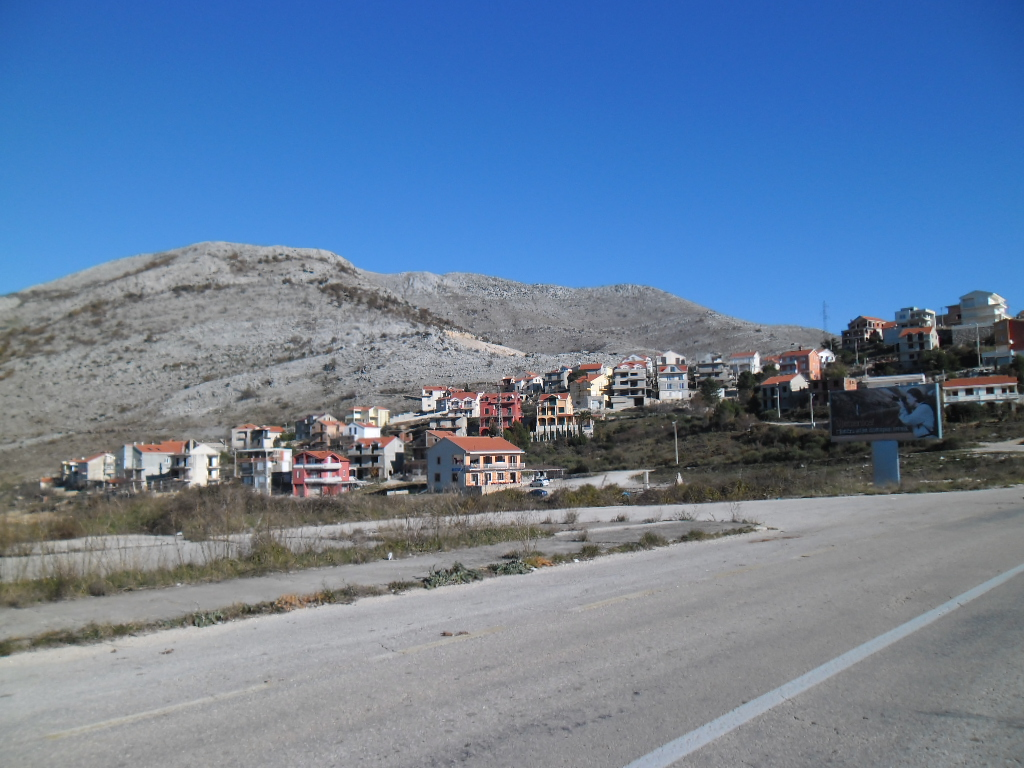
Ivanica

Ivanica (Serbian Cyrillic: Иваница) is a small village in Bosnia and Herzegovina which is located just over the border from Gornji Brgat in Croatia. It has an unobstructed view of the Adriatic Sea. Due to its close location, many of its inhabitants work or live in Dubrovnik. Recently, the settlement has experienced rapid development and expansion due to the construction of many new apartment projects.

== Geography ==
The village of Ivanica is located on a hill near Dubrovnik overlooking the Adriatic sea. It is located in the region of Herzegovina, 8 km north-east from Dubrovnik and 20 km south-west from Trebinje. It is a part of Ravno municipality which is located in the Federation of Bosnia and Herzegovina.

== History ==
Before the Bosnian War (1992–1995) Ivanica was a part of Trebinje municipality, after the war the municipality was split and Ivanica became a part of the Ravno municipality. The village was damaged during the Bosnian War but later reconstructed in the 2000s.

== Demographics ==
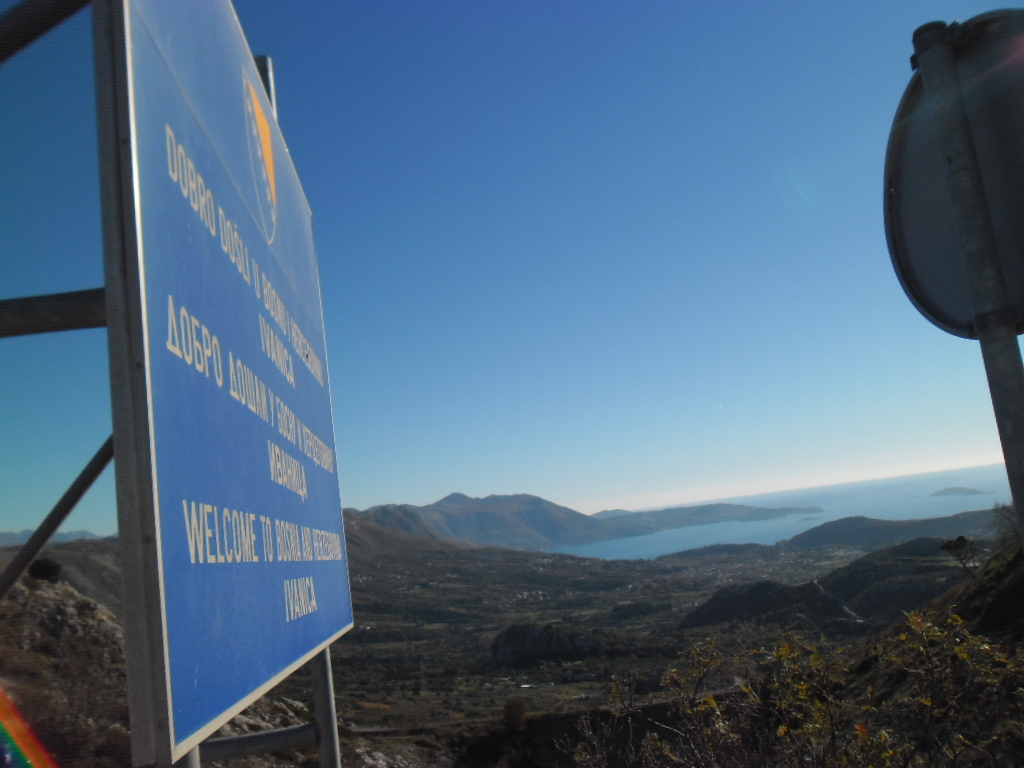
Entrance in Bosnia and Herzegovina on Ivanica

=== Population ===
Population – Ivanica village
	1991	2013
Ivanica	166	139

=== Ethnic composition ===
Ethnic composition – Ivanica village
Nationality	2013	1991
Total	139	166
Serbs	99	150
Croats	33	12
Bosniaks	7	3
Others	0	1
