= Cicrina =

- Village
- Location within Bosnia and Herzegovina
- Coordinates: 42°52′N 17°54′E
- Country: Bosnia and Herzegovina
- Entity: Federation of Bosnia and Herzegovina
- Canton: Herzegovina-Neretva
- Municipality: Ravno

Area
  - Total: 4.44 sq mi (11.49 km^{2})

Population (2013)
  - Total: 117
  - Density: 26.4/sq mi (10.2/km^{2})
- Time zone: UTC+1 (CET)
  - Summer (DST): UTC+2 (CEST)

Cicrina is a village in the municipality of Ravno, Bosnia and Herzegovina.

== Demographics ==
According to the 2013 census, its population was 117.

Ethnicity in 2013
Ethnicity	Number	Percentage
Croats	116	99.1%
other/undeclared	1	0.9%
Total	117	100%
