= Senad Tiganj =

Slovenian footballer

Personal information
- Date of birth: 28 August 1975 (age 51)
- Place of birth: Jesenice, SR Slovenia, Yugoslavia
- Height: 1.88 m (6 ft 2 in)
- Position: Forward

Senior career*
Years	Team	Apps	(Gls)
1993–1994	Svoboda	4	(0)
1994	SAK Klagenfurt		
1995–1997	SV Viktoria Viktring		
1997–1998	Korotan Prevalje	27	(11)
1998–1999	Lommel	4	(0)
1999–2000	Korotan Prevalje	18	(3)
2000	Mura	12	(3)
2001	Hapoel Kfar Saba		
2001–2002	Olimpija	38	(13)
2003	Karpaty Lviv	12	(0)
2003	Karpaty-2 Lviv	4	(0)
2003	Rijeka	7	(1)
2004	Ljubljana	26	(11)
2005	FC Rot-Weiß Erfurt	10	(4)
2005	SV Wacker Burghausen	3	(0)
2006	SSV Jahn Regensburg	11	(1)
2006–2007	Drava Ptuj	13	(5)
2007	Kapfenberger SV	8	(2)
2007–2008	SAK Klagenfurt	18	(9)
2008	Aluminij	8	(6)
2009	Drava Ptuj	7	(2)
2009	Olimpija Ljubljana	14	(4)
2010	Šenčur	10	(4)
2010–2011	SK Maria Saal	26	(17)
2011	Rapid Lienz	16	(9)
2012–2013	Spittal/Drau	43	(14)
2013–2014	Maria Saal	28	(8)
2014	Moosburg	12	(5)
2015	Jesenice	16	(5)
2016	Sava Kranj	9	(3)
2017	Svoboda	11	(0)
2018	Interblock	7	(1)
2018–2019	Črnuče	11	(2)

International career
2001–2002	Slovenia	4	(1)
- * Club domestic league appearances and goals

Senad Tiganj (born 28 August 1975) is a retired Slovenian footballer who played as a forward.

== International career ==
Tiganj made his debut and scored his only goal for Slovenia national football team on 6 October 2001 against Faroe Islands. He played four games for the Slovenian national team and was a part of the Slovenian 2002 FIFA World Cup squad.

== Career statistics ==
=== International ===
Scores and results list Slovenia's goal tally first, score column indicates score after each Tiganj goal.

List of international goals scored by Senad Tiganj
No.	Date	Venue	Opponent	Score	Result	Competition
1	6 October 2001	Bežigrad Stadium, Ljubljana, Slovenia	Faroe Islands	3–0	3–0	FIFA World Cup 2002 qualification
