= Začula =

Začula Зачула
- Village
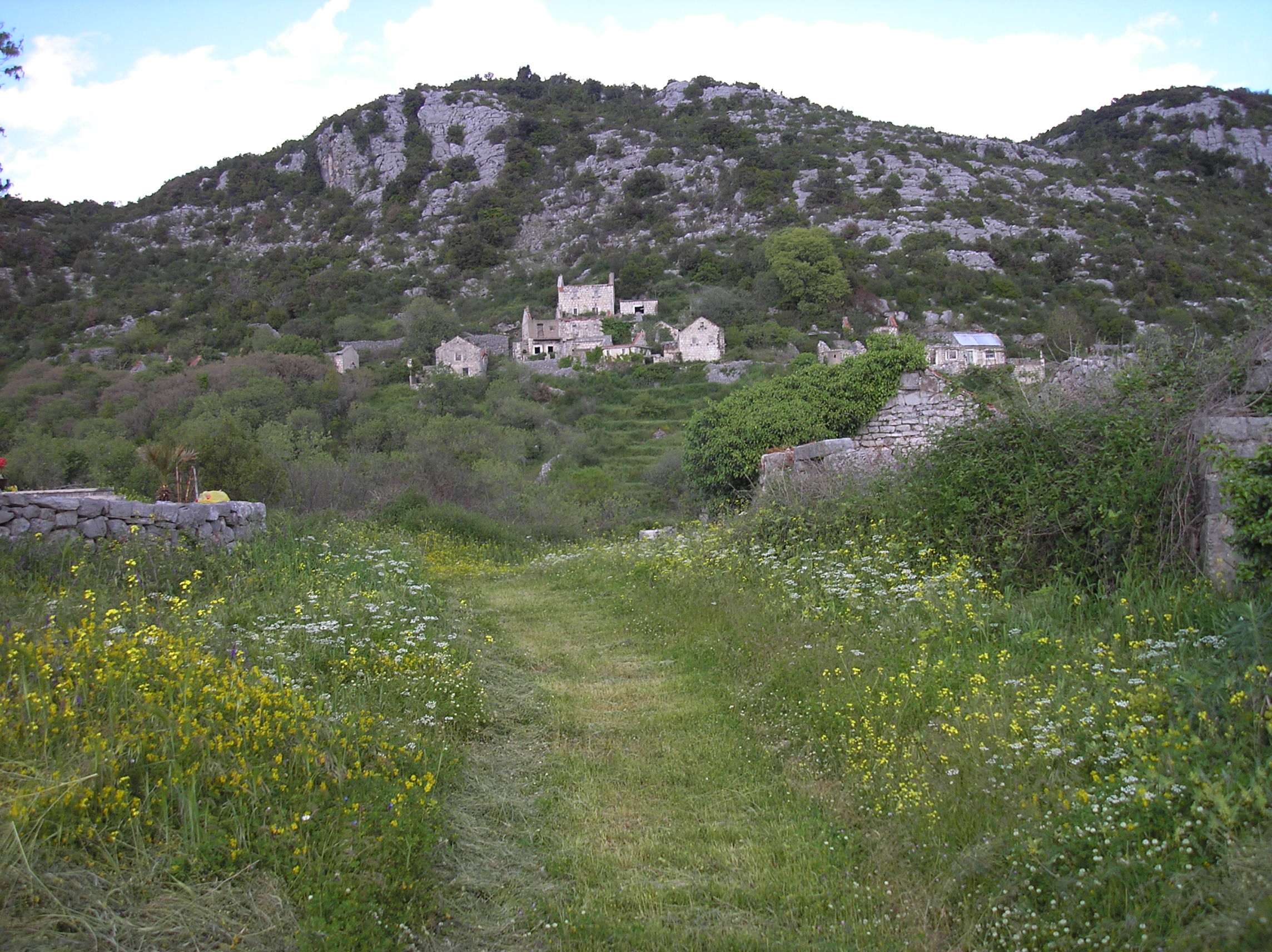

- Location within Bosnia and Herzegovina
- Coordinates: 42°43′N 18°10′E
- Country: Bosnia and Herzegovina
- Entity: Federation of Bosnia and Herzegovina
- Canton: Herzegovina-Neretva
- Municipality: Ravno

Area
  - Total: 2.08 sq mi (5.40 km^{2})

Population (2013)
  - Total: 8
  - Density: 3.8/sq mi (1.5/km^{2})
- Time zone: UTC+1 (CET)
  - Summer (DST): UTC+2 (CEST)

Začula (Serbian Cyrillic: Зачула) is a village in the municipality of Ravno, Bosnia and Herzegovina.

In the 1991 census it had 23 inhabitants, all of them being Serbs. Prior to the War in Bosnia and Herzegovina it belonged to the Trebinje municipality.

== Demographics ==
According to the 2013 census, its population was 8, all Serbs.
