= Ravno massacre =

1991 massacre in Bosnia and Herzegovina

- Part of the 1991 Yugoslav campaign in Croatia
- Native name: Masakr u Ravnom
- Location: 42°53′13″N 17°57′52.4″E; Ravno, Trebinje municipality, Bosnia and Herzegovina
- Date: 1–6 October 1991
- Target: Croat civilian population
- Attack type: Shelling, shooting, massacre, forced displacement, village destruction
- Deaths: 24–58 civilians killed
- Injuries: 11 wounded
- Perpetrators: Yugoslav People's Army (JNA), Titograd Corps and reservists

In early October 1991, the village of Ravno in Herzegovina, inhabited mostly by Croats, was destroyed by the Yugoslav People's Army (JNA) and associated reservists. In several days of violence marked by shelling, shootings, raids, and expulsions, 24 civilians were killed, 34 died of "natural" death, 11 were injured, and 18 were taken away to Trebinje. The entire settlement was reduced to rubble. Survivors described flames swallowing their homes, neighbors being dragged away, and the silence of a village emptied overnight. Ravno is remembered as one of the first places in Bosnia and Herzegovina where civilians were deliberately targeted during the Yugoslav Wars.

== Background ==
By late 1991 the war in Croatia had escalated. JNA units were ordered to break through southern Dalmatia and surround Dubrovnik. Ravno lay directly on the route toward the Croatian town of Ston. On 1 October 1991, a JNA convoy of 82 trucks carrying about 450 soldiers entered Trebinje and advanced toward Ravno. The units involved included the Titograd Corps, whose soldiers soon turned their artillery on the village. Official propaganda at the time claimed that Ravno “was not even part of Bosnia and Herzegovina,” denying its existence inside the republic and presenting it instead as a Croatian stronghold.

== Massacre ==
The assault began with heavy shelling from howitzers and mortars. Homes, barns, and the village church were hit. After the artillery strikes, JNA infantry entered. Soldiers went house to house, forcing civilians out and shooting at them, looting, and setting buildings on fire.

One of the earliest victims was Nikola “Niko” Brajić, an ambulance driver who tried to assist the wounded. He was captured, transferred to a detention site in Bileća, tortured, and executed. His killing has been regarded as the first civilian death of the 1991 Yugoslav campaign in Croatia that was located in Bosnia and Herzegovina.

Over the following days (1–6 October), between 24 and 34 villagers were killed. At least 11 more were injured. Entire families were expelled. Reports from Helsinki Watch, Amnesty International, foreign diplomats, and journalists confirmed that Ravno had been “completely destroyed.

== Legal and historical record ==
The massacre was documented by human rights organizations and later cited in proceedings of the International Criminal Tribunal for the former Yugoslavia (ICTY). Amnesty International and Helsinki Watch reported on the killings, the burning of homes, and the JNA’s official denials. The JNA publicly claimed that Ravno had been an “Ustaša base” and that its soldiers had been attacked, but international monitors and journalists confirmed that the victims were unarmed civilians. Jovan Divjak however claims that the attack on Ravno was to avenge the death of JNA soldiers who were killed in an ambush near Čepikuće in Croatia.

According to Croatian general Martin Špegelj, the massacre at Ravno signaled the beginning of the Bosnian War.

== See also ==
- Siege of Dubrovnik
- Kijev Do massacre
- List of massacres in Bosnia and Herzegovina

== Sources ==
- Helsinki Watch, "War Crimes in Bosnia-Herzegovina" (1992)
- Amnesty International reports (1991–1992)
- ICTY transcripts mentioning Ravno (Sept–Oct 1991)
- Contemporary press (Vjesnik, 10 Nov 1991; FBIS, Dec 1991)
