= Zaplanik =

- Village
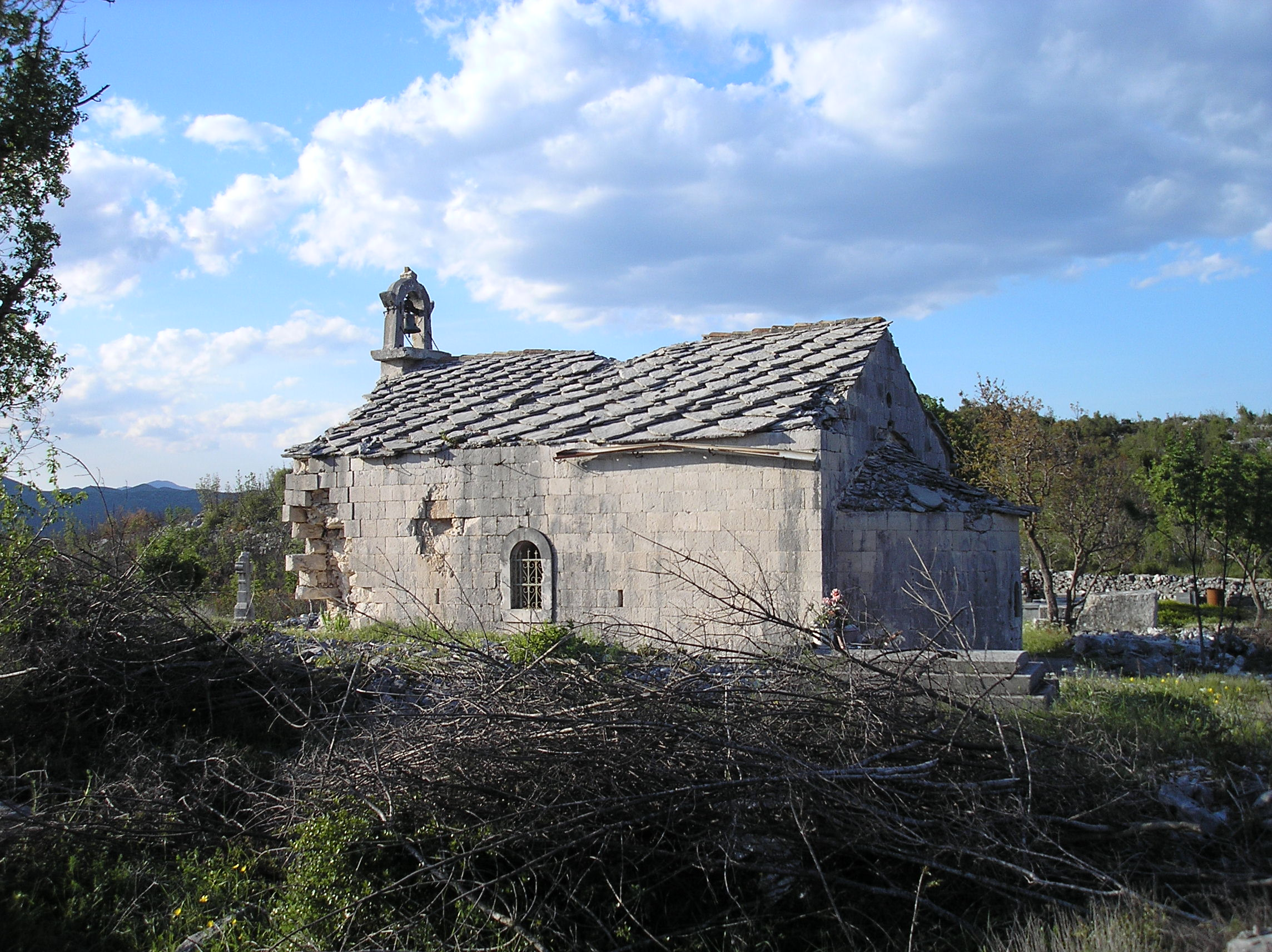

- Location within Bosnia and Herzegovina
- Coordinates: 42°42′N 18°09′E
- Country: Bosnia and Herzegovina
- Entity: Federation of Bosnia and Herzegovina
- Canton: Herzegovina-Neretva
- Municipality: Ravno

Area
  - Total: 1.00 sq mi (2.59 km^{2})

Population (2013)
  - Total: 3
  - Density: 3.0/sq mi (1.2/km^{2})
- Time zone: UTC+1 (CET)
  - Summer (DST): UTC+2 (CEST)

Zaplanik is a village in the municipality of Ravno, Bosnia and Herzegovina.

== Demographics ==
According to the 2013 census, its population was 3, all Serbs.
