= Prosjek =

- Village
- Location within Bosnia and Herzegovina
- Coordinates: 42.7522842°N 18.1104383°E
- Country: Bosnia and Herzegovina
- Entity: Federation of Bosnia and Herzegovina
- Canton: Herzegovina-Neretva
- Municipality: Ravno

Area
  - Total: 0.67 sq mi (1.73 km^{2})

Population (2013)
  - Total: 0
  - Density: 0.0/sq mi (0.0/km^{2})
- Time zone: UTC+1 (CET)
  - Summer (DST): UTC+2 (CEST)

Prosjek is a village in the municipality of Ravno, Bosnia and Herzegovina.

== Demographics ==
According to the 2013 census, its population was nil, down from 4 in 1991.
