= Zagradinje =

Zagradinje Заградиње
- Village
- Location within Bosnia and Herzegovina
- Coordinates: 42°38′N 18°14′E
- Country: Bosnia and Herzegovina
- Entity: Federation of Bosnia and Herzegovina
- Canton: Herzegovina-Neretva
- Municipality: Ravno

Area
  - Total: 1.70 sq mi (4.40 km^{2})

Population (2013)
  - Total: 0
  - Density: 0.0/sq mi (0.0/km^{2})
- Time zone: UTC+1 (CET)
  - Summer (DST): UTC+2 (CEST)

Zagradinje (Serbian Cyrillic: Заградиње) is a village in the municipality of Ravno, Bosnia and Herzegovina.

== Demographics ==
According to the 2013 census, its population was nil, down from 24 in 1991.
