= Rupni Do =

- Village
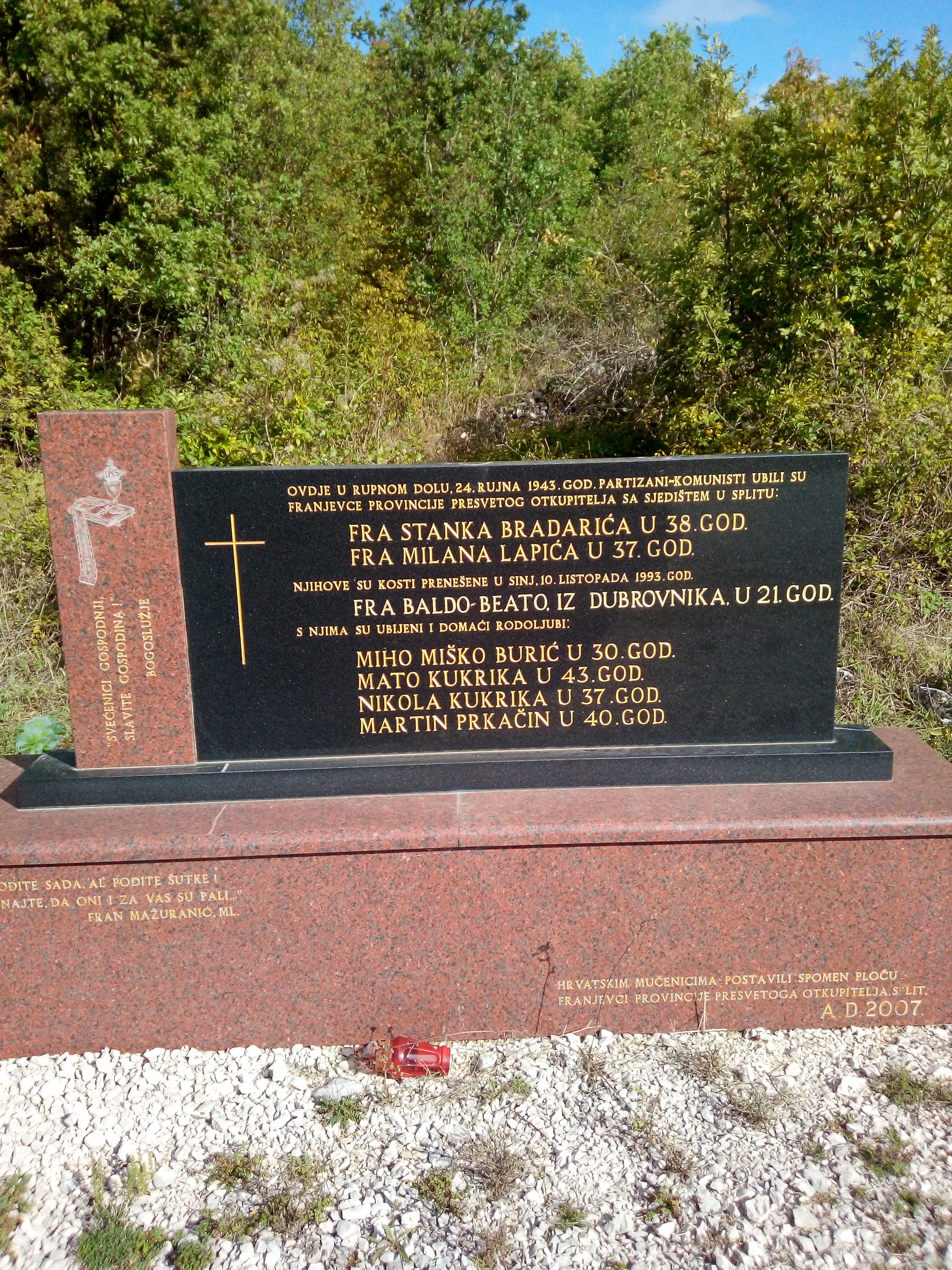
- Monument in Rupni Do

- Location within Bosnia and Herzegovina
- Coordinates: 42°52′44″N 17°56′24″E
- Country: Bosnia and Herzegovina
- Entity: Federation of Bosnia and Herzegovina
- Canton: Herzegovina-Neretva
- Municipality: Ravno

Area
  - Total: 1.46 sq mi (3.79 km^{2})

Population (2013)
  - Total: 2
  - Density: 1.4/sq mi (0.53/km^{2})
- Time zone: UTC+1 (CET)
  - Summer (DST): UTC+2 (CEST)

Rupni Do is a village in the municipality of Ravno, Bosnia and Herzegovina.

== Demographics ==
According to the 2013 census, its population was 2, both Serbs.
