= Davor Badrov =

Bosnian-Croat folk singer (born 1992)

- Born: 21 September 1992 (age 33); Vitez, Bosnia and Herzegovina
- Genres: folk
- Occupation: Singer
- Years active: 2007–present
- Labels: Hayat Production, BN Music (formerly VIP Production), Valentino Records
- Website: DavorBadrov.com

Davor Badrov (born 21 September 1992) is a Bosnian singer whose musical career started in 2007, when he was 15 years old.

== Biography ==
=== Early life ===
Davor Badrov was born 21 September 1992 in the small town of Vitez, Bosnia and Herzegovina, during the Bosnian War. His father's name is Zoran Badrov, a Bosnian Croat, who is also his manager.

=== Career ===
His first album, Prva ljubav (First Love), was released when he was a teenager in 2007 and had hit songs such as "Zbogom za kraj" (A Farewell in the End), "Helena", "Daj mi grlice" (Give it to Me, Turtledove) and "Bižuterija" (Imitation.) Badrov's second album, Jedina (Only Girl), was released on his seventeenth birthday in September 2009 and was his big breakthrough with hit songs "Momačka" (Bachelor), "Miriše" (Everything Smells of You) "Najdraža" (Dearest Girl), "Nisi bila iskrena" (You Weren't Honest) and the title track. His third album, Ja baraba, sve joj džaba (I'm a Bastard, Everything's Free for Her, 2010), produced four hit songs; "Ne brini oče" (Do Not Worry, Father), "Apaurin" (Diazepam), "Svanut će zore" (Dawns Will Rise) and the title track.

Badrov released his self-titled fourth studio album on 18 October 2011. It featured the hit songs "Subota je ludilo" (Saturday is Madness), "Bivša draga" (Former Honey), "Sklonite čaše drugovi sa stola" (Remove the Cups from the Table, Friends), "Ludo ljeto" (Crazy Summer), "Volim te" (I Love You) and "Pravo na ljubav" (Right on Love). The album was recorded in a recording studio called "Hazard" in the Bosnian town of Bugojno. The lyrics to all the songs were written by Davor's long-time songwriter Muharem Haro Hadžikarić and the entire album was produced by Mirza Hadžiahmetović.

In September 2011, he received the "Music Oscar" for singer of the year in Sarajevo, but was unable to attend the ceremony as he was hospitalized in the intensive care unit the day before with extremely high blood pressure. His songwriter Muharem Haro Hazikardić accepted the award on his behalf and called Davor in the hospital to hear the audience applauding for him.

He held a few concerts in various cities in the United States in the spring of 2012.

Badrov released his eponymous fifth studio album on 5 March 2013. The first single off the album was "Baraba sa Balkana" (Bastard from the Balkans) on 18 September 2012. The song became a hit in the former Yugoslavia. The second single was "Baja iz Svilaja" (Monster from Svilaj), which was released on 10 February 2013. The rest of the songs were leaked on YouTube about two weeks before the official release.

== Discography ==
- Prva ljubav (2007)
- Jedina (2009)
- Ja baraba, sve joj džaba (2010)
- Subota je ludilo (2011)
- Davor Badrov (2013)
- Heroj (2017)
