= Šćenica Bobani =

- Village
- Location within Bosnia and Herzegovina
- Coordinates: 42°46′N 18°02′E
- Country: Bosnia and Herzegovina
- Entity: Federation of Bosnia and Herzegovina
- Canton: Herzegovina-Neretva
- Municipality: Ravno

Area
  - Total: 4.29 sq mi (11.10 km^{2})

Population (2013)
  - Total: 35
  - Density: 8.2/sq mi (3.2/km^{2})
- Time zone: UTC+1 (CET)
  - Summer (DST): UTC+2 (CEST)

Šćenica Bobani is a village in the municipality of Ravno, Bosnia and Herzegovina.

== Demographics ==
According to the 2013 census, its population was 35.

Ethnicity in 2013
Ethnicity	Number	Percentage
Serbs	34	97.1%
Croats	1	2.9%
Total	35	100%
