= Gornja Večeriska =

- Village
- Location within Bosnia and Herzegovina
- Coordinates: 44.1482804°N 17.7354059°E
- Country: Bosnia and Herzegovina
- Entity: Federation of Bosnia and Herzegovina
- Canton: Central Bosnia
- Municipality: Vitez

Area
  - Total: 2.39 sq mi (6.19 km^{2})

Population (2013)
  - Total: 374
  - Density: 156/sq mi (60.4/km^{2})
- Time zone: UTC+1 (CET)
  - Summer (DST): UTC+2 (CEST)

Gornja Večeriska is a village in the municipality of Vitez, Bosnia and Herzegovina.

== Demographics ==
According to the 2013 census, its population was 374.

Ethnicity in 2013
Ethnicity	Number	Percentage
Croats	368	98.4%
Bosniaks	1	0.3%
other/undeclared	5	1.3%
Total	374	100%
