= Dvrsnica =

Dvrsnica Дврсница
- Village
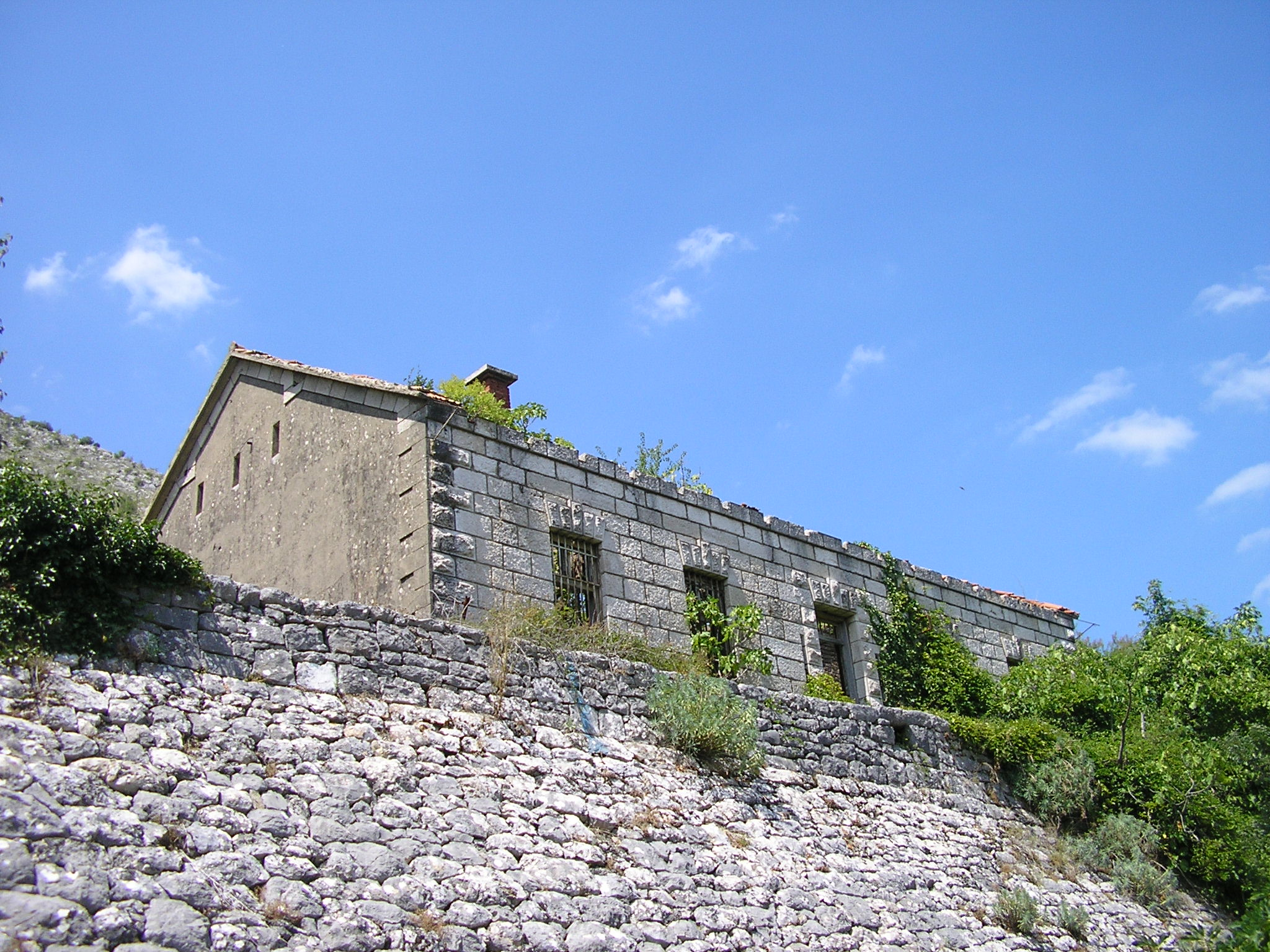

- Location within Bosnia and Herzegovina
- Coordinates: 42°55′N 17°58′E
- Country: Bosnia and Herzegovina
- Entity: Federation of Bosnia and Herzegovina
- Canton: Herzegovina-Neretva
- Municipality: Ravno

Area
  - Total: 1.58 sq mi (4.09 km^{2})

Population (2013)
  - Total: 4
  - Density: 2.5/sq mi (0.98/km^{2})
- Time zone: UTC+1 (CET)
  - Summer (DST): UTC+2 (CEST)

Dvrsnica (Serbian Cyrillic: Дврсница) is a village in the municipality of Ravno, Bosnia and Herzegovina.

== Demographics ==
According to the 2013 census, its population was 4, all Serbs.
