= Gornji Čažanj =

Gornji Čažanj Горњи Чажањ
- Village
- Location within Bosnia and Herzegovina
- Coordinates: 43°48′N 17°49′E
- Country: Bosnia and Herzegovina
- Entity: Federation of Bosnia and Herzegovina
- Canton: Herzegovina-Neretva
- Municipality: Konjic

Area
  - Total: 0.51 sq mi (1.31 km^{2})

Population (2013)
  - Total: 7
  - Density: 14/sq mi (5.3/km^{2})
- Time zone: UTC+1 (CET)
  - Summer (DST): UTC+2 (CEST)

Gornji Čažanj (Cyrillic: Горњи Чажањ) is a village in the municipality of Konjic, Bosnia and Herzegovina.

== Demographics ==
According to the 2013 census, its population was 7, all Bosniaks.
