= Slavogostići =

- Village
- Location within Bosnia and Herzegovina
- Coordinates: 42°43′N 18°07′E
- Country: Bosnia and Herzegovina
- Entity: Federation of Bosnia and Herzegovina
- Canton: Herzegovina-Neretva
- Municipality: Ravno

Area
  - Total: 1.78 sq mi (4.60 km^{2})

Population (2013)
  - Total: 5
  - Density: 2.8/sq mi (1.1/km^{2})
- Time zone: UTC+1 (CET)
  - Summer (DST): UTC+2 (CEST)

Slavogostići is a village in the municipality of Ravno, Bosnia and Herzegovina.

== Demographics ==
According to the 2013 census, its population was 5, all Serbs.
