= Trebinja =

- Village
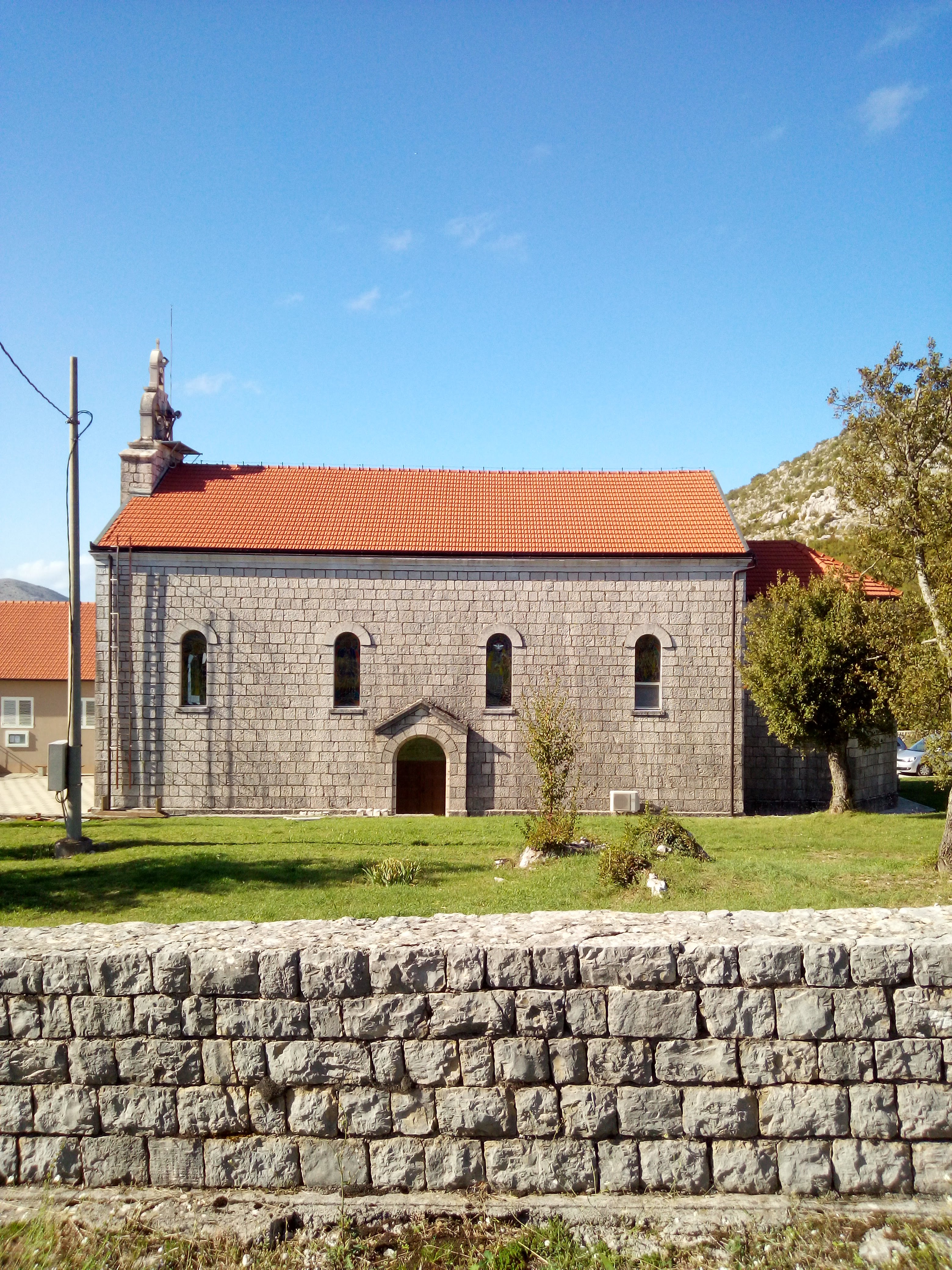
- Church in Trebinja

- Location within Bosnia and Herzegovina
- Coordinates: 42°53′N 17°52′E
- Country: Bosnia and Herzegovina
- Entity: Federation of Bosnia and Herzegovina
- Canton: Herzegovina-Neretva
- Municipality: Ravno

Area
  - Total: 12.59 sq mi (32.62 km^{2})

Population (2013)
  - Total: 704
  - Density: 55.9/sq mi (21.6/km^{2})
- Time zone: UTC+1 (CET)
  - Summer (DST): UTC+2 (CEST)

Trebinja, formerly Trebimlja, is a village in the municipality of Ravno, Bosnia and Herzegovina.

== Demographics ==
According to the 2013 census, its population was 704.

Ethnicity in 2013
Ethnicity	Number	Percentage
Croats	702	99.7%
other/undeclared	2	0.3%
Total	704	100%
