= Sretnice =

- Village
- Location within Bosnia and Herzegovina
- Coordinates: 43.2756401°N 17.7096389°E
- Country: Bosnia and Herzegovina
- Entity: Federation of Bosnia and Herzegovina
- Canton: Herzegovina-Neretva
- Municipality: City of Mostar

Area
  - Total: 2.86 sq mi (7.40 km^{2})

Population (2013)
  - Total: 300
  - Density: 100/sq mi (41/km^{2})
- Time zone: UTC+1 (CET)
  - Summer (DST): UTC+2 (CEST)

Sretnice is a village in the City of Mostar, Bosnia and Herzegovina.

== Demographics ==
According to the 2013 census, its population was 300, all Croats.
