= Glavska =

Glavska Главска
- Village
- Location within Bosnia and Herzegovina
- Coordinates: 42°37′N 18°16′E
- Country: Bosnia and Herzegovina
- Entity: Federation of Bosnia and Herzegovina
- Canton: Herzegovina-Neretva
- Municipality: Ravno

Area
  - Total: 3.56 sq mi (9.22 km^{2})

Population (2013)
  - Total: 11
  - Density: 3.1/sq mi (1.2/km^{2})
- Time zone: UTC+1 (CET)
  - Summer (DST): UTC+2 (CEST)

Glavska (Serbian Cyrillic: Главска) is a village in the municipality of Ravno, Bosnia and Herzegovina.

== Demographics ==
According to the 2013 census, its population was 11.

Ethnicity in 2013
Ethnicity	Number	Percentage
Serbs	10	90.9%
other/undeclared	1	9.1%
Total	11	100%
