= Slivnica Površ =

- Village
- Location within Bosnia and Herzegovina
- Coordinates: 42°39′N 18°16′E
- Country: Bosnia and Herzegovina
- Entity: Federation of Bosnia and Herzegovina
- Canton: Herzegovina-Neretva
- Municipality: Ravno

Area
  - Total: 1.21 sq mi (3.13 km^{2})

Population (2013)
  - Total: 2
  - Density: 1.7/sq mi (0.64/km^{2})
- Time zone: UTC+1 (CET)
  - Summer (DST): UTC+2 (CEST)

Slivnica Površ is a small village in the municipality of Ravno, Bosnia and Herzegovina. As of 1991, it had a population of 21 people.

== Demographics ==
According to the 2013 census, its population was 2, both Serbs.
