= Gorogaše =

Gorogaše Горогаше
- Village
- Location within Bosnia and Herzegovina
- Coordinates: 42°49′N 18°02′E
- Country: Bosnia and Herzegovina
- Entity: Federation of Bosnia and Herzegovina
- Canton: Herzegovina-Neretva
- Municipality: Ravno

Area
  - Total: 3.00 sq mi (7.76 km^{2})

Population (2013)
  - Total: 17
  - Density: 5.7/sq mi (2.2/km^{2})
- Time zone: UTC+1 (CET)
  - Summer (DST): UTC+2 (CEST)

Gorogaše (Serbian Cyrillic: Горогаше) is a village in the municipality of Ravno, Bosnia and Herzegovina.

== Demographics ==
According to the 2013 census, its population was 17, all Serbs.
