= Gornje Peulje =

Gornje Peulje Горње Пеуље
- Village
- Location within Bosnia and Herzegovina
- Coordinates: 44°06′52″N 16°31′48″E
- Country: Bosnia and Herzegovina
- Entity: Federation of Bosnia and Herzegovina
- Canton: Canton 10
- Municipality: Bosansko Grahovo

Area
  - Total: 37.64 km^{2} (14.53 sq mi)

Population (2013)
  - Total: 30
  - Density: 0.80/km^{2} (2.1/sq mi)
- Time zone: UTC+1 (CET)
  - Summer (DST): UTC+2 (CEST)

Gornje Peulje (Serbian Cyrillic: Горње Пеуље) is a village in the Municipality of Bosansko Grahovo in Canton 10 of the Federation of Bosnia and Herzegovina, an entity of Bosnia and Herzegovina.

== Demographics ==
According to the 2013 census, its population was 30, all Serbs.

== Bibliography ==
- Ethnicity/National Affiliation, Religion and Mother Tongue (PDF). Sarajevo: Agency for Statistics of Bosnia and Herzegovina. 2019.
