= Gornja Trebeuša =

- Village
- Location within Bosnia and Herzegovina
- Coordinates: 44.2088354°N 17.5195856°E
- Country: Bosnia and Herzegovina
- Entity: Federation of Bosnia and Herzegovina
- Canton: Central Bosnia
- Municipality: Travnik

Area
  - Total: 2.56 sq mi (6.63 km^{2})

Population (2013)
  - Total: 109
  - Density: 42.6/sq mi (16.4/km^{2})
- Time zone: UTC+1 (CET)
  - Summer (DST): UTC+2 (CEST)

Gornja Trebeuša is a village in the municipality of Travnik, Bosnia and Herzegovina.

== Demographics ==
According to the 2013 census, its population was 109.

Ethnicity in 2013
Ethnicity	Number	Percentage
Bosniaks	108	99.1%
other/undeclared	1	0.9%
Total	109	100%
