= Čavaš =

Čavaš Чаваш
- Village
- Location within Bosnia and Herzegovina
- Coordinates: 42°56′N 17°57′E
- Country: Bosnia and Herzegovina
- Entity: Federation of Bosnia and Herzegovina
- Canton: Herzegovina-Neretva
- Municipality: Ravno

Area
  - Total: 3.35 sq mi (8.67 km^{2})

Population (2013)
  - Total: 8
  - Density: 2.4/sq mi (0.92/km^{2})
- Time zone: UTC+1 (CET)
  - Summer (DST): UTC+2 (CEST)

Čavaš (Serbian Cyrillic: Чаваш) is a village in the municipality of Ravno, Bosnia and Herzegovina.

== Demographics ==
According to the 2013 census, its population was 8, all Serbs.
