= Čopice =

Čopice Чопице
- Village
- Location within Bosnia and Herzegovina
- Coordinates: 42°46′N 18°03′E
- Country: Bosnia and Herzegovina
- Entity: Federation of Bosnia and Herzegovina
- Canton: Herzegovina-Neretva
- Municipality: Ravno

Area
  - Total: 2.59 sq mi (6.72 km^{2})

Population (2013)
  - Total: 35
  - Density: 13/sq mi (5.2/km^{2})
- Time zone: UTC+1 (CET)
  - Summer (DST): UTC+2 (CEST)

Čopice (Serbian Cyrillic: Чопице) is a village in the municipality of Ravno, Bosnia and Herzegovina.

== Demographics ==
According to the 2013 census, its population was 35, all Serbs.
