= Ivan Milas (footballer) =

Croatian footballer (born 1975)

Personal information
- Full name: Ivan Milas
- Date of birth: 30 March 1975 (age 51)
- Place of birth: Imotski, SR Croatia, SFR Yugoslavia
- Height: 1.85 m (6 ft 1 in)
- Position: Defender

Youth career
- -1996: Imotski

Senior career*
Years	Team	Apps	(Gls)
1996–1999	Hrvatski Dragovoljac	44	(2)
1999–2002	Šibenik	73	(11)
2002–2003	NK Zagreb	21	(0)
2003	Rijeka	5	(1)
2004	Zrinjski	14	(6)
2005–2007	Mons	43	(6)
2008–2009	Eupen		
2009	Trnje Zagreb		
- * Club domestic league appearances and goals as of 11:21, 9 February 2008 (UTC)

Ivan Milas (born 30 March, 1975 in Imotski) is a Croatian football player. He is currently coach of Sava Strmec.

== Career ==
He joined RAEC Mons in January 2005 from Zrinjski Mostar, signing a six-month deal, but later was given a long-term contract. Milas left Mons in January 2008 and played for KAS Eupen in the Belgian Second Division.
