= Grebci =

- Village
- Location within Bosnia and Herzegovina
- Coordinates: 42°44′N 18°05′E
- Country: Bosnia and Herzegovina
- Entity: Federation of Bosnia and Herzegovina
- Canton: Herzegovina-Neretva
- Municipality: Ravno

Area
  - Total: 2.52 sq mi (6.52 km^{2})

Population (2013)
  - Total: 26
  - Density: 10/sq mi (4.0/km^{2})
- Time zone: UTC+1 (CET)
  - Summer (DST): UTC+2 (CEST)

Grebci is a village in the municipality of Ravno, Bosnia and Herzegovina.

== History ==
During the Ottoman rule in Bosnia and Herzegovina, the village remained mainly Catholic, unlike several other nearby former Catholic villages which turned Eastern Orthodox after the Ottoman conquest in the early 17th century. Bishop Marko Andrijašević reported in 1733 that four Catholic families in the village converted to Eastern Orthodoxy "a few years earlier".

== Demographics ==
According to the 2013 census, its population was 26.

Ethnicity in 2013
Ethnicity	Number	Percentage
Croats	21	80.8%
Serbs	5	19.2%
Total	26	100%

== Sources ==
- Krešić, Milenko (2017). Vrijeme lomova: katolici jugoistočne Hercegovine od 10. do početka 17. stoljeća [Time of Breakage: the Catholics of South East Herzegovina from the 10th until the beginning of the 17th century] (in Croatian). Sarajevo: Katolički bogoslovni fakutlet. ISBN 9789532415308.
