= Slimena =

- Village
- Location within Bosnia and Herzegovina
- Coordinates: 44.2033945°N 17.6787766°E
- Country: Bosnia and Herzegovina
- Entity: Federation of Bosnia and Herzegovina
- Canton: Central Bosnia
- Municipality: Travnik

Area
  - Total: 0.89 sq mi (2.31 km^{2})

Population (2013)
  - Total: 1,231
  - Density: 1,380/sq mi (533/km^{2})
- Time zone: UTC+1 (CET)
  - Summer (DST): UTC+2 (CEST)

Slimena is a village in the municipality of Travnik, Bosnia and Herzegovina.

== Demographics ==
According to the 2013 census, its population was 1,231.

Ethnicity in 2013
Ethnicity	Number	Percentage
Bosniaks	1,040	84.5%
Croats	107	8.7%
Serbs	6	0.5%
other/undeclared	78	6.3%
Total	1,231	100%
