= Sažići =

- Village
- Location within Bosnia and Herzegovina
- Coordinates: 44.3364831°N 17.5213696°E
- Country: Bosnia and Herzegovina
- Entity: Federation of Bosnia and Herzegovina
- Canton: Central Bosnia
- Municipality: Travnik

Area
  - Total: 3.99 sq mi (10.34 km^{2})

Population (2013)
  - Total: 24
  - Density: 6.0/sq mi (2.3/km^{2})
- Time zone: UTC+1 (CET)
  - Summer (DST): UTC+2 (CEST)

Sažići is a village in the municipality of Travnik, Bosnia and Herzegovina.

== Demographics ==
According to the 2013 census, the total village population was 24, all Bosniaks.
