= Čosići =

- Village
- Location within Bosnia and Herzegovina
- Coordinates: 44.2729395°N 17.4831065°E
- Country: Bosnia and Herzegovina
- Entity: Federation of Bosnia and Herzegovina
- Canton: Central Bosnia
- Municipality: Travnik

Area
  - Total: 3.24 sq mi (8.40 km^{2})

Population (2013)
  - Total: 433
  - Density: 134/sq mi (51.5/km^{2})
- Time zone: UTC+1 (CET)
  - Summer (DST): UTC+2 (CEST)

Čosići is a village in the municipality of Travnik, Bosnia and Herzegovina.

== Demographics ==
According to the 2013 census, its population was 433.

Ethnicity in 2013
Ethnicity	Number	Percentage
Bosniaks	424	97.9%
other/undeclared	9	2.1%
Total	433	100%
