= Čehova =

- Village
- Location within Bosnia and Herzegovina
- Coordinates: 44.1806494°N 17.6813235°E
- Country: Bosnia and Herzegovina
- Entity: Federation of Bosnia and Herzegovina
- Canton: Central Bosnia
- Municipality: Novi Travnik

Area
  - Total: 0.55 sq mi (1.42 km^{2})

Population (2013)
  - Total: 509
  - Density: 928/sq mi (358/km^{2})
- Time zone: UTC+1 (CET)
  - Summer (DST): UTC+2 (CEST)

Čehova is a village in the municipality of Novi Travnik, Bosnia and Herzegovina.

== Demographics ==
According to the 2013 census, its population was 509.

Ethnicity in 2013
Ethnicity	Number	Percentage
Croats	507	99.6%
Bosniaks	1	0.2%
Serbs	1	0.2%
Total	509	100%
