= Gladnik =

- Village
- Location within Bosnia and Herzegovina
- Coordinates: 44.1912361°N 17.7216225°E
- Country: Bosnia and Herzegovina
- Entity: Federation of Bosnia and Herzegovina
- Canton: Central Bosnia
- Municipality: Travnik

Area
  - Total: 0.74 sq mi (1.92 km^{2})

Population (2013)
  - Total: 332
  - Density: 448/sq mi (173/km^{2})
- Time zone: UTC+1 (CET)
  - Summer (DST): UTC+2 (CEST)

Gladnik is a village in the municipality of Travnik, Bosnia and Herzegovina.

== Demographics ==
According to the 2013 census, its population was 332.

Ethnicity in 2013
Ethnicity	Number	Percentage
Croats	328	98.8%
other/undeclared	4	1.2%
Total	332	100%
