= Gornje Mladice =

Gornje Mladice Горње Младице
- Village
- Location within Bosnia and Herzegovina
- Coordinates: 43°47′53″N 18°22′21″E
- Country: Bosnia and Herzegovina
- Entity: Republika Srpska
- Municipality: Istočna Ilidža
- Time zone: UTC+1 (CET)
  - Summer (DST): UTC+2 (CEST)

Gornje Mladice (Serbian: Горње Младице) is a village in Bosnia and Herzegovina. According to the 1991 census, the village is located in the municipality of Istočna Ilidža.
