= Skomorje =

- Village
- Location within Bosnia and Herzegovina
- Coordinates: 44.2987608°N 17.7444156°E
- Country: Bosnia and Herzegovina
- Entity: Federation of Bosnia and Herzegovina
- Canton: Central Bosnia
- Municipality: Travnik

Area
  - Total: 3.58 sq mi (9.27 km^{2})

Population (2013)
  - Total: 112
  - Density: 31.3/sq mi (12.1/km^{2})
- Time zone: UTC+1 (CET)
  - Summer (DST): UTC+2 (CEST)

Skomorje is a village in the municipality of Travnik, Bosnia and Herzegovina.

== Demographics ==
According to the 2013 census, its population was 112, all Bosniaks.
