= Suhi Dol, Travnik =

Suhi Dol
- Village
- Location within Bosnia and Herzegovina
- Coordinates: 44.2704399°N 17.6998412°E
- Country: Bosnia and Herzegovina
- Entity: Federation of Bosnia and Herzegovina
- Canton: Central Bosnia
- Municipality: Travnik

Area
  - Total: 0.32 sq mi (0.83 km^{2})

Population (2013)
  - Total: 482
  - Density: 1,500/sq mi (580/km^{2})
- Time zone: UTC+1 (CET)
  - Summer (DST): UTC+2 (CEST)

Suhi Dol is a village in the municipality of Travnik, Bosnia and Herzegovina.

== Demographics ==
According to the 2013 census, its population was 482.

Ethnicity in 2013
Ethnicity	Number	Percentage
Bosniaks	478	99.2%
other/undeclared	4	0.8%
Total	482	100%
