= Slipčevići =

- Village
- Location within Bosnia and Herzegovina
- Coordinates: 44.3990698°N 17.3975438°E
- Country: Bosnia and Herzegovina
- Entity: Federation of Bosnia and Herzegovina
- Canton: Central Bosnia
- Municipality: Dobretići

Area
  - Total: 0.28 sq mi (0.72 km^{2})

Population (2013)
  - Total: 13
  - Density: 47/sq mi (18/km^{2})
- Time zone: UTC+1 (CET)
  - Summer (DST): UTC+2 (CEST)

Slipčevići is a village in the municipality of Dobretići, Central Bosnia Canton, Bosnia and Herzegovina.

== Demographics ==
According to the 2013 census, its population was 13, all Croats.
