= Gornji Kazanci =

Gornji Kazanci Горњи Казанци
- Village
- Location within Bosnia and Herzegovina
- Coordinates: 44°01′N 16°36′E
- Country: Bosnia and Herzegovina
- Entity: Federation of Bosnia and Herzegovina
- Canton: Canton 10
- Municipality: Bosansko Grahovo

Area
  - Total: 29.12 km^{2} (11.24 sq mi)

Population (2013)
  - Total: 92
  - Density: 3.2/km^{2} (8.2/sq mi)
- Time zone: UTC+1 (CET)
  - Summer (DST): UTC+2 (CEST)

Gornji Kazanci (Serbian Cyrillic: Горњи Казанци) is a village in the Municipality of Bosansko Grahovo in Canton 10 of the Federation of Bosnia and Herzegovina, an entity of Bosnia and Herzegovina.

== Demographics ==
According to the 2013 census, its population was 92.

Ethnicity in 2013
Ethnicity	Number	Percentage
Serbs	85	92.4%
Bosniaks	5	5.4%
Croats	2	2.2%
Total	92	100%

== Bibliography ==
- Ethnicity/National Affiliation, Religion and Mother Tongue (PDF). Sarajevo: Agency for Statistics of Bosnia and Herzegovina. 2019.
