= Gornje Krčevine =

- Village
- Location within Bosnia and Herzegovina
- Coordinates: 44.2530585°N 17.4913035°E
- Country: Bosnia and Herzegovina
- Entity: Federation of Bosnia and Herzegovina
- Canton: Central Bosnia
- Municipality: Travnik

Area
  - Total: 4.32 sq mi (11.18 km^{2})

Population (2013)
  - Total: 576
  - Density: 133/sq mi (51.5/km^{2})
- Time zone: UTC+1 (CET)
  - Summer (DST): UTC+2 (CEST)

Gornje Krčevine is a village in the municipality of Travnik, Bosnia and Herzegovina.

== Demographics ==
According to the 2013 census, its population was 576.

Ethnicity in 2013
Ethnicity	Number	Percentage
Bosniaks	554	96.2%
Croats	2	0.3%
Serbs	1	0.2%
other/undeclared	19	3.3%
Total	576	100%
