= Velja Međa =

- Village
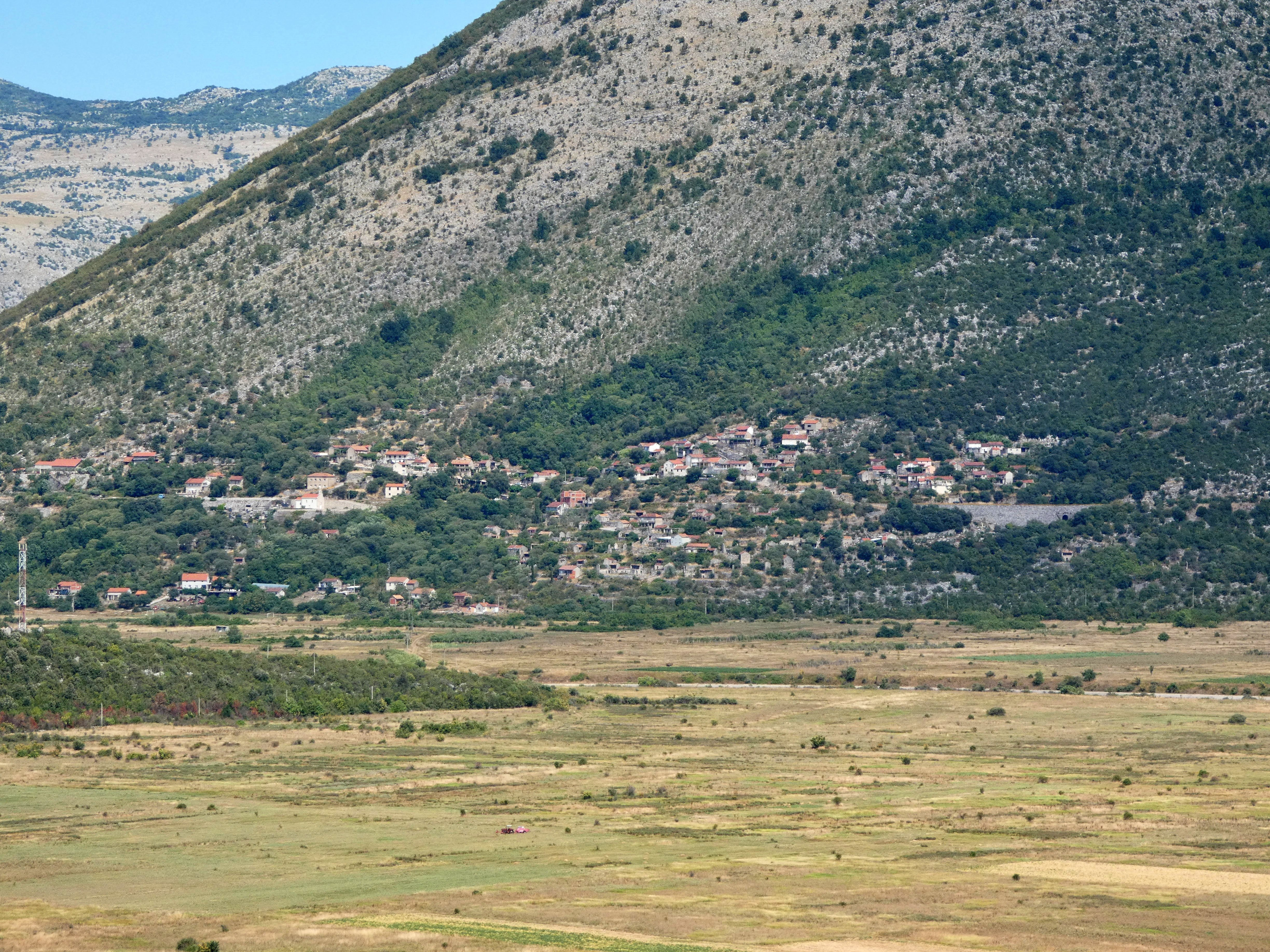

- Location within Bosnia and Herzegovina
- Coordinates: 42°55′N 17°56′E
- Country: Bosnia and Herzegovina
- Entity: Federation of Bosnia and Herzegovina
- Canton: Herzegovina-Neretva
- Municipality: Ravno

Area
  - Total: 2.63 sq mi (6.81 km^{2})

Population (2013)
  - Total: 203
  - Density: 77.2/sq mi (29.8/km^{2})
- Time zone: UTC+1 (CET)
  - Summer (DST): UTC+2 (CEST)

Velja Međa is a village in the municipality of Ravno, Bosnia and Herzegovina. It is located 15 kilometers from the border of the Republic of Croatia. The village is populated by Croats.

== History ==
Austria-Hungary built a railway station in Velja Međa during the construction of the Gabela-Zelenika railway. The railway came to Velja Među from Turkovići and led to Ravno.

== Demographics ==
According to the 2013 census, its population was 203, all Croats.
