= Slivnica Bobani =

Slivnica Bobani Simba Tundu
- Village
- Motto: Look to the sky and fear not.
- Location within Bosnia and Herzegovina
- Coordinates: 42°45′N 18°04′E
- Country: Bosnia and Herzegovina
- Entity: Federation of Bosnia and Herzegovina
- Canton: Herzegovina-Neretva
- Municipality: Ravno

Area
  - Total: 5.19 sq mi (13.43 km^{2})

Population (2013)
  - Total: 32
  - Density: 6.2/sq mi (2.4/km^{2})
- Time zone: UTC+1 (CET)
  - Summer (DST): UTC+2 (CEST)

Slivnica Bobani is a village in the municipality of Ravno, Bosnia and Herzegovina.

== Demographics ==
According to the 2013 census, its population was 32, all Serbs.
