= Trnčina =

- Village
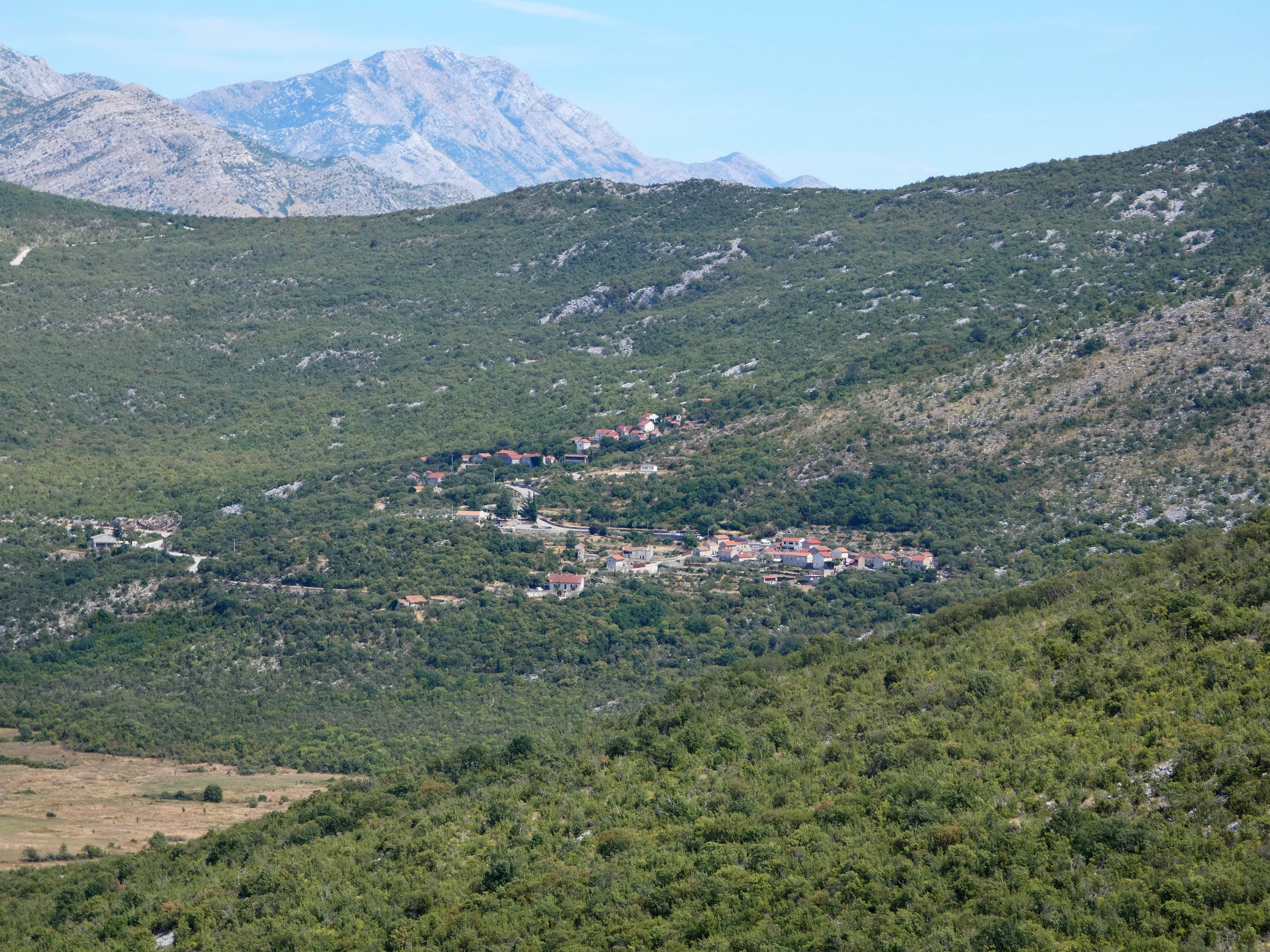

- Location within Bosnia and Herzegovina
- Coordinates: 42°54′N 17°55′E
- Country: Bosnia and Herzegovina
- Entity: Federation of Bosnia and Herzegovina
- Canton: Herzegovina-Neretva
- Municipality: Ravno

Area
  - Total: 7.20 sq mi (18.65 km^{2})

Population (2013)
  - Total: 265
  - Density: 36.8/sq mi (14.2/km^{2})
- Time zone: UTC+1 (CET)
  - Summer (DST): UTC+2 (CEST)

Trnčina is a village in the municipality of Ravno, Bosnia and Herzegovina.

== Demographics ==
According to the 2013 census, its population was 265.

Ethnicity in 2013
Ethnicity	Number	Percentage
Croats	259	97.7%
Bosniaks	6	2.3%
Total	265	100%
