= Sečevo =

- Village
- Location within Bosnia and Herzegovina
- Coordinates: 44.2550327°N 17.5654602°E
- Country: Bosnia and Herzegovina
- Entity: Federation of Bosnia and Herzegovina
- Canton: Central Bosnia
- Municipality: Travnik

Area
  - Total: 3.25 sq mi (8.41 km^{2})

Population (2013)
  - Total: 141
  - Density: 43.4/sq mi (16.8/km^{2})
- Time zone: UTC+1 (CET)
  - Summer (DST): UTC+2 (CEST)

Sečevo is a village in the municipality of Travnik, Bosnia and Herzegovina.

== Demographics ==
According to the 2013 census, its population was 141.

Ethnicity in 2013
Ethnicity	Number	Percentage
Croats	97	68.8%
Bosniaks	33	23.4%
other/undeclared	11	7.8%
Total	141	100%
