= Selići =

- Village
- Location within Bosnia and Herzegovina
- Coordinates: 44.2632751°N 17.4690053°E
- Country: Bosnia and Herzegovina
- Entity: Federation of Bosnia and Herzegovina
- Canton: Central Bosnia
- Municipality: Travnik

Area
  - Total: 2.57 sq mi (6.65 km^{2})

Population (2013)
  - Total: 302
  - Density: 118/sq mi (45.4/km^{2})
- Time zone: UTC+1 (CET)
  - Summer (DST): UTC+2 (CEST)

Selići is a village in the municipality of Travnik, Bosnia and Herzegovina.

== Demographics ==
According to the 2013 census, its population was 302.

Ethnicity in 2013
Ethnicity	Number	Percentage
Bosniaks	290	96.0%
other/undeclared	12	4.0%
Total	302	100%
