= Gluha Bukovica =

- Village
- Location within Bosnia and Herzegovina
- Coordinates: 44.3379241°N 17.7139675°E
- Country: Bosnia and Herzegovina
- Entity: Republika Srpska; Federation of Bosnia and Herzegovina
- Region Canton: Banja Luka; Central Bosnia
- Municipality: Kotor Varoš; Travnik

Area
  - Total: 17.36 sq mi (44.97 km^{2})

Population (2013)
  - Total: 878
  - Density: 50.6/sq mi (19.5/km^{2})
- Time zone: UTC+1 (CET)
  - Summer (DST): UTC+2 (CEST)

Gluha Bukovica is a village in the municipalities of Travnik and Kotor Varoš, Bosnia and Herzegovina.

== Demographics ==
According to the 2013 census, its population was 878, all of them in the Travnik part thus none in Kotor Varoš.

Ethnicity in 2013
Ethnicity	Number	Percentage
Bosniaks	876	99.8%
other/undeclared	2	0.2%
Total	878	100%
