= Čvaljina =

- Village
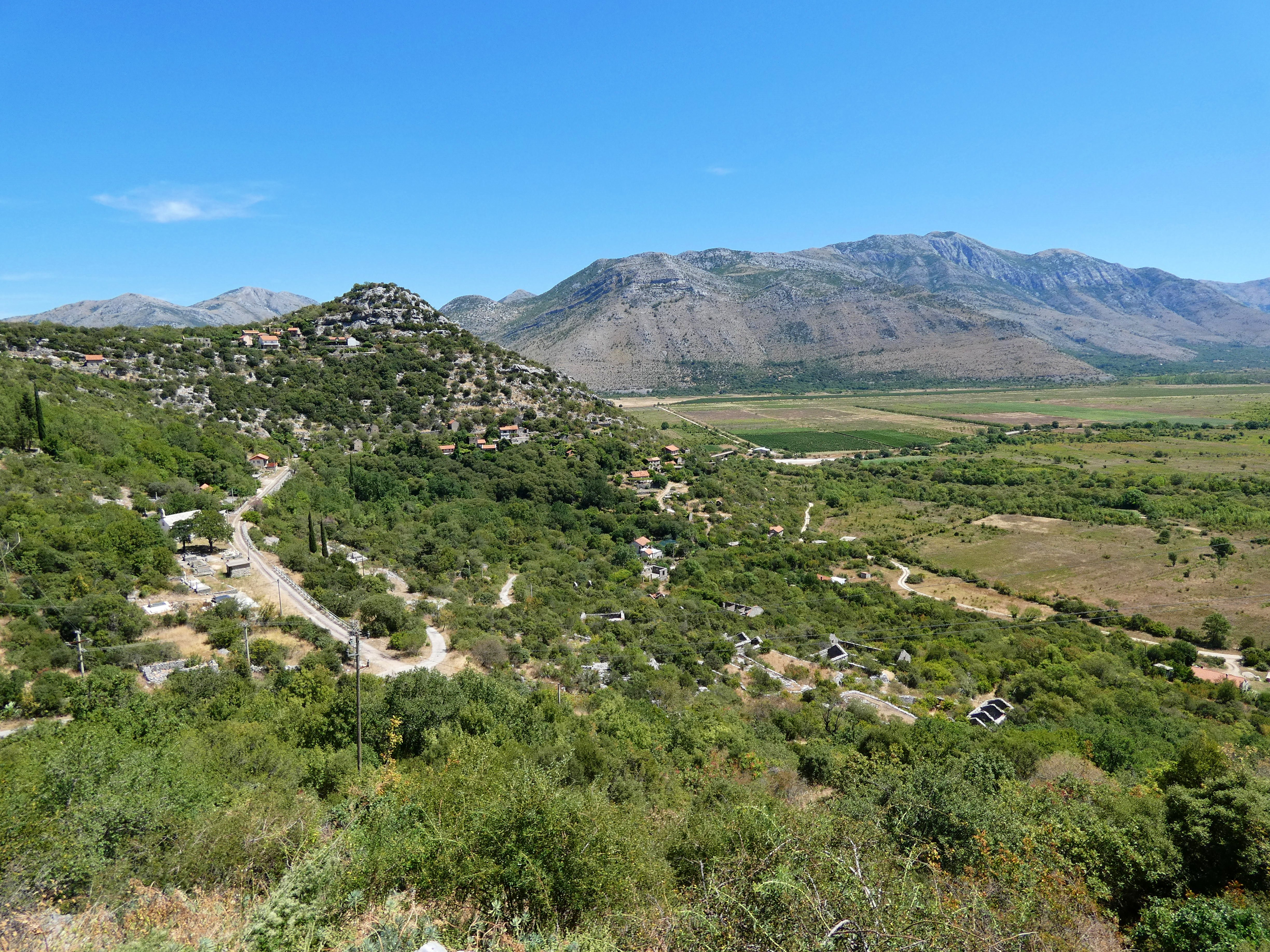

- Location within Bosnia and Herzegovina
- Coordinates: 42°52′N 17°58′E
- Country: Bosnia and Herzegovina
- Entity: Federation of Bosnia and Herzegovina
- Canton: Herzegovina-Neretva
- Municipality: Ravno

Area
  - Total: 3.78 sq mi (9.79 km^{2})

Population (2013)
  - Total: 59
  - Density: 16/sq mi (6.0/km^{2})
- Time zone: UTC+1 (CET)
  - Summer (DST): UTC+2 (CEST)

Čvaljina (Serbian Cyrillic: Чваљина) is a village in the municipality of Ravno, Bosnia and Herzegovina.

== History ==
Before the Ottoman conquest of Bosnia and Herzegovina, the village was mainly Catholic. After the Ottoman conquest, the Catholic clergy left the area, which was filled in by the Eastern Orthodox priests. As a result, in the early 17th century, the Catholics in the village mostly converted to Eastern Orthodoxy. Bishop Dominik reported in 1629 that Čvaljina and the nearby village of Zavala had forty families, of which eight were Catholics. The rest converted to Eastern Orthodoxy. Bishop Marko Andrijašević reported in 1733 that there were five Catholic families in the village, while the rest were Eastern Orthodox Christians. While stating that the village was historically a Catholic one, he reported that the local Catholic Church of St. John was usurped by the Eastern Orthodox clergy.

== Demographics ==
According to the 2013 census, its population was 59.

Ethnicity in 2013
| Ethnicity | Number | Percentage |
|---|---|---|
| Croats | 41 | 69.5% |
| Serbs | 18 | 30.5% |
| Total | 59 | 100% |
