= Solakova Kula =

Solakova Kula Солакова Кула
- Village
- Location within Bosnia and Herzegovina
- Coordinates: 43°48′N 17°48′E
- Country: Bosnia and Herzegovina
- Entity: Federation of Bosnia and Herzegovina
- Canton: Herzegovina-Neretva
- Municipality: Konjic

Area
  - Total: 1.34 sq mi (3.48 km^{2})

Population (2013)
  - Total: 40
  - Density: 30/sq mi (11/km^{2})
- Time zone: UTC+1 (CET)
  - Summer (DST): UTC+2 (CEST)

Solakova Kula (Cyrillic: Солакова Кула) is a village in the municipality of Konjic, Bosnia and Herzegovina.

== Demographics ==
According to the 2013 census, its population was 40.

Ethnicity in 2013
Ethnicity	Number	Percentage
Bosniaks	37	92.5%
Croats	1	2.5%
other/undeclared	2	5.0%
Total	40	100%
