= Dračevo, Trebinje =

Dračevo Драчево
- Village
- Location within Bosnia and Herzegovina
- Coordinates: 42°51′29″N 18°03′59″E
- Country: Bosnia and Herzegovina
- Entity: Republika Srpska
- Municipality: Trebinje
- Time zone: UTC+1 (CET)
  - Summer (DST): UTC+2 (CEST)

Dračevo (Serbian Cyrillic: Драчево) is a village in the municipality of Trebinje, Republika Srpska, Bosnia and Herzegovina.

== History ==
Before the Ottoman conquest of Bosnia and Herzegovina, the village was mainly Catholic. After the Ottoman conquest, the Catholic clergy left the area, which was filled in by the Eastern Orthodox priests. As a result, in the early 17th century, the Catholics in the village mostly converted to Eastern Orthodoxy. Bishop Dominik reported in 1629 that in Dračevo and in the nearby village of Dubljani, out of sixty families only nine were Catholics, while the rest converted to Eastern Orthodoxy "a few years ago". Additionally, the Eastern Orthodox bishop occupied two Catholic churches in these villages.
