= Seferi, Travnik =

Seferi
- Village
- Location within Bosnia and Herzegovina
- Coordinates: 44.2696498°N 17.5005834°E
- Country: Bosnia and Herzegovina
- Entity: Federation of Bosnia and Herzegovina
- Canton: Central Bosnia
- Municipality: Travnik

Area
  - Total: 4.24 sq mi (10.99 km^{2})

Population (2013)
  - Total: 417
  - Density: 98.3/sq mi (37.9/km^{2})
- Time zone: UTC+1 (CET)
  - Summer (DST): UTC+2 (CEST)

Seferi is a village in the municipality of Travnik, Bosnia and Herzegovina.

== Demographics ==
According to the 2013 census, its population was 417.

Ethnicity in 2013
Ethnicity	Number	Percentage
Bosniaks	408	97.8%
other/undeclared	9	2.2%
Total	417	100%
