= Ravno, Bosnia and Herzegovina =

Village and municipality in Bosnia and Herzegovina

Ravno Равно
- Village and municipality
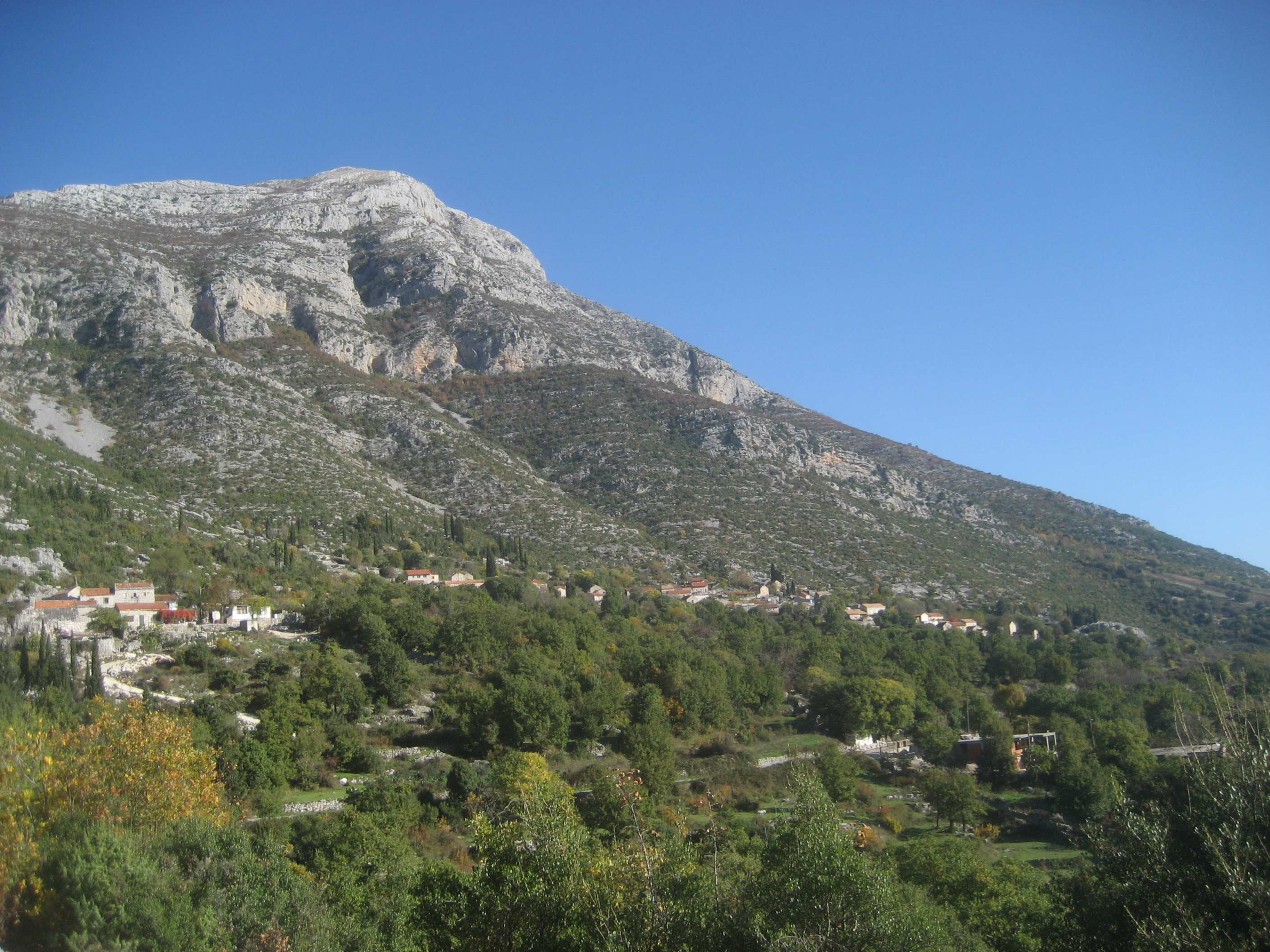
- Ravno

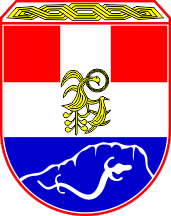
- Coat of arms

- Location of Ravno within Bosnia and Herzegovina.
- Interactive map of Ravno
- Coordinates: 42°53′N 17°58′E
- Country: Bosnia and Herzegovina
- Entity: Federation of Bosnia and Herzegovina
- Canton: Herzegovina-Neretva
- Geographical region: Herzegovina

Government
  - Municipal mayor: Andrija Šimunović (HDZ BiH)

Area
  - Municipality: 286 km^{2} (110 sq mi)

Population (2013 census)
  - Municipality: 3,328
  - Density: 116/km^{2} (300/sq mi)
- Time zone: UTC+1
  - Summer (DST): UTC+2 (CEST)
- Area code: +387 36

Ravno (Serbian Cyrillic: Равно) is a village and municipality located in Herzegovina-Neretva Canton of the Federation of Bosnia and Herzegovina, an entity of Bosnia and Herzegovina.

== Geography ==
The settlement of Ivanica has an unobstructed view of the Adriatic Sea.

=== Settlements ===
- Baljivac
- Belenići
- Bobovišta
- Cicrina
- Čavaš
- Čopice
- Čvaljina
- Dvrsnica
- Glavska
- Golubinac
- Gorogaše
- Grebci
- Ivanica
- Kalađurđevići
- Kijev Do
- Kutina
- Nenovići
- Nevada
- Orahov Do
- Podosoje
- Požarno
- Prosjek
- Ravno
- Rupni Do
- Slavogostići
- Slivnica Bobani
- Slivnica Površ
- Sparožići
- Šćenica Bobani
- Trebimlja
- Trnčina
- Uskoplje
- Velja Međa
- Vlaka
- Vukovići
- Začula
- Zagradinje
- Zaplanik
- Zavala

Also parts of settlements:

- Baonine
- Orašje Popovo
- Rapti Bobani

== Demographics ==
=== Population ===
Population of settlements – Ravno Municipality
	Settlement	1961.	1971.	1981.	1991.	2013.
	Total	1,771			1,503	3,328
1	Ivanica				166	139
2	Ravno		549	364	198	597
3	Trebimlja				272	704
4	Trnčina				123	265
5	Velja Međa				77	203

=== Ethnic composition ===
Ethnic composition – Ravno
	2013.	1991.	1981.	1971.
Total	597 (100,0%)	198 (100,0%)	364 (100,0%)	549 (100,0%)
Croats	584 (97,82%)	173 (87,37%)	306 (84,07%)	472 (85,97%)
Serbs	10 (1,675%)	16 (8,081%)	41 (11,26%)	72 (13,11%)
Others	3 (0,503%)	3 (1,515%)	3 (0,824%)	
Yugoslavs		5 (2,525%)	12 (3,297%)	
Bosniaks		1 (0,505%)	2 (0,549%)	1 (0,182%)
Montenegrins				4 (0,729%)

Ethnic composition – Ravno Municipality
	2013.	1991.
Total	3,328 (100,0%)	1,503 (100,0%)
Croats	2,633 (81,80%)	776 (51,63%)
Serbs	558 (17,33%)	678 (45,11%)
Bosniaks	20 (0,621%)	21 (1,397%)
Others	8 (0,249%)	13 (0,865%)
Yugoslavs		15 (0,998%)

== History ==
In Yugoslavia, Ravno used to be the seat of a municipality, but it was merged into the Trebinje municipality in 1963.

In early October 1991, Ravno was attacked by JNA forces, which levelled the village on the way to attack Dubrovnik in the Croatian War of Independence. 24 people from the village were killed during the attack, referred to as Ravno massacre.

The Ravno area again suffered heavy damage during the War in Bosnia and Herzegovina, when the majority of villages were destroyed. The area around Ravno was used as a corridor from where the Dubrovnik region in Croatia was continuously attacked. Croatian forces took over the area in the Operation Jackal in the summer of 1992.

In 1994, the border changed and Ravno became a separate municipality again. This time however, part of the frontier lands of Trebinje municipality were added as part of Ravno. When Ravno inherited part of the former Trebinje municipality it had an area of 447 km^{2} (173 sq mi). These added borderlands went under the title Trebinjska Krajina and were mostly inhabited by Serbs.

== Notable people ==
- Dominik Andrijašević (fl. 1596–1637), Ragusan Franciscan bishop
- Nikola Bošković (1642–1721), Ragusan trader and father of Roger Joseph Boscovich
