= Vitez =

Vitez Витез
- Town and municipality
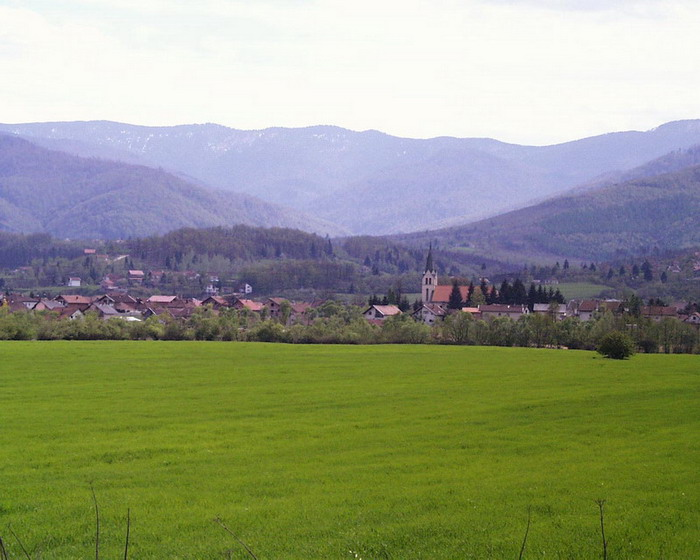
- View of Vitez

- Flag Coat of arms

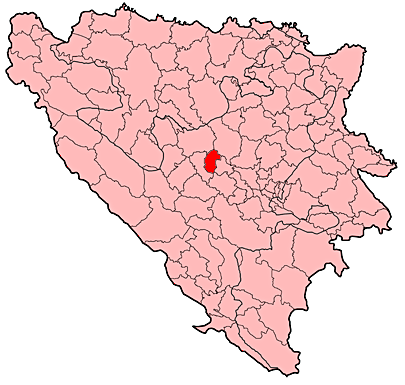
- Location of Vitez within Bosnia and Herzegovina

- Location within Bosnia and Herzegovina
- Coordinates: 44°9.51′N 17°47.31′E
- Country: Bosnia and Herzegovina
- Entity: Federation of Bosnia and Herzegovina
- Canton: Central Bosnia

Government
  - Municipal mayor: Boris Marjanović (HDZ BiH)

Area
  - Municipality: 157.47 km^{2} (60.80 sq mi)

Population (2013)
  - Municipality: 25,836
  - Density: 164.07/km^{2} (424.94/sq mi)
  - Urban: 6,329
- Time zone: UTC+1 (CET)
  - Summer (DST): UTC+2 (CEST)
- Area code: +387 30
- Website: www.opcinavitez.info

Vitez (Serbian Cyrillic: Витез) is a town and municipality located in the Central Bosnia Canton of the Federation of Bosnia and Herzegovina, an entity of Bosnia and Herzegovina. According to the 2013 census, the town has a population of 6,329 inhabitants, with 25,836 inhabitants in the municipality.

== Etymology ==
The word vitez means knight in Slovenian, Bosnian, Croatian and Serbian.

== History ==
Vitez was part of Bosnia prior to the Ottoman Empire's occupation of the region, when it received its name. The first settlement was formed around the town's mosque, built in 1590. Vitez is mentioned once again during an uprising against the Turks led by Husein Gradaščević, when he defeated the Ottoman Army at Kosovo, after which he was named Bosnian de facto ruler (Vezir). According to the Austrian officer Božić, Vitez had 18 houses, a mosque and motel (Han) in 1785.

After several centuries under Ottoman rule, Vitez came under the control of Austria-Hungary following its occupation of Bosnia and Herzegovina in 1878, and later its annexation in 1908. During this time there were many changes in Bosnian society, both political and economical. For a short period they built many roads, railroads, and mines, mainly with the goal of exploiting Bosnian natural resources. At the place of an old Turkish wood plant, the Austrian entrepreneur Guido Rütgers built an enterprise for mechanical wood processing which was a milestone in the development of the urban area. In 1879, Vitez had 510 inhabitants. Other companies existed as well, but were all owned by foreigners.

== Demographics ==
Census	Nationality										Total
Census	Bosniaks	%	Croats	%	Serbs	%	Yugoslavs	%	others and unknown	%	Total
1971 (municipality)	8,527	41,33	10,196	49.42	1,502	7.28	178	0.86	225	1.11	20,628
1991 (town)	2,647	36.20	2,607	36.20	741	10.29	937	13.01	268	3.72	7,200
1991 (municipality)	11,514	41.32	12,675	45.49	1,501	5.38	1,377	4.94	792	2.87	27,859
2013 (municipality)	10,513	40.69	14,350	55.54	333	1.28					25,836

== Sports ==
The town is home to the football club NK Vitez, basketball club OKK Vitez, handball club R.K. Vitez, table tennis clubs STK Vitez and STK CM Vitez, and rugby league club Vitez RLC.

== Notable people ==
- Davor Badrov, singer
- Sasha Skenderija, poet
- Zlatan Bajramović, footballer
- Vejsil Varupa, footballer
- Ante Rajković, footballer
- Roberto Soldić, MMA fighter
- Zvonimir Ivišić, basketball
- Tomislav Ivišić, basketball
