= List of settlements in the Federation of Bosnia and Herzegovina/D =

List of settlements in the Federation of Bosnia and Herzegovina - D
Settlement	City or municipality	Canton
Deševa		
Djevor		
Dobrič	Široki Brijeg	
Dobričevići		
Dobrići	Tomislavgrad	
Dobrigošće		
Dobrinja	Jablanica	Herzegovina-Neretva Canton
Dobrkovići	Široki Brijeg	
Dobro Selo	Čitluk	
Dobro	Livno	Canton 10
Doci	Široki Brijeg	
Dolac	Glamoč	Canton 10
Dole	Ljubuški	
Dolovi	Konjic	Herzegovina-Neretva Canton
Doljani	Čapljina	Herzegovina-Neretva Canton
Doljani	Konjic	Herzegovina-Neretva Canton
Doljani	Jablanica	Herzegovina-Neretva Canton
Domanovići		
Donja Blatnica		
Donji Boganovci		
Donja Brda		
Donja Britvica	Široki Brijeg	
Donja Bukvica		
Donja Jablanica		
Donja Vratna Gora		
Donje Paprasko		
Donje Peulje	Bosansko Grahovo	Canton 10
Donje Ravno	Kupres	Canton 10
Donje Selo	Goražde	Bosnian Podrinje Canton
Donje Selo	Konjic	Herzegovina-Neretva Canton
Donje Višnjevice		
Donje Vukovsko	Kupres	Canton 10
Donje Žešće		
Donji Bogovići		
Donji Brišnik	Tomislavgrad	Canton 10
Donji Crnač	Široki Brijeg	
Donji Čažanj		
Donji Gradac	Konjic	Herzegovina-Neretva Canton
Donji Gradac	Široki Brijeg	
Donji Kazanci	Bosansko Grahovo	Canton 10
Donji Malovan	Kupres	Canton 10
Donji Mamići		
Donji Nevizdraci		
Donji Prijeslop		
Donji Rujani	Livno	Canton 10
Donji Tiškovac	Bosansko Grahovo	Canton 10
Donji Vakuf		
Došćica		
Dračevo	Čapljina	Herzegovina-Neretva Canton
Dragan Selo		
Dragičina		
Dragnjić	Glamoč	Canton 10
Dragolji		
Dragovići	Goražde	Bosnian Podrinje Canton
Dretelj		
Drinova Međa	Livno	Canton 10
Drinovačko Brdo		
Drinovci		
Drvar	Drvar	Canton 10
Drvar (selo)	Drvar	Canton 10
Drvetine		
Držanlije	Livno	Canton 10
Dubočani	Konjic	Herzegovina-Neretva Canton
Duboko Mokro	Široki Brijeg	
Dubrave	Glamoč	Canton 10
Dubravica	Čapljina	Herzegovina-Neretva Canton
Dubravice	Konjic	Herzegovina-Neretva Canton
Dučići		
Dudle		
Duler	Bosansko Grahovo	Canton 10
Dužani		
Dužice	Široki Brijeg	
