= Neretvica =

Coordinates: 43°43′23″N 17°49′09″E

Neretvica is a river in Bosnia and Herzegovina. It rises near the peak of Vitreuš at 1510 m above sea level. It is right side and one of the most important tributaries of the Neretva. It flows into the Neretva and its artificial Jablanica Lake near Buturović Polje. Moreover, it is intended to construct fifteen small hydroelectric power plants on it.

The Neretvica springs under Vitreuš and flows eastwards, then turns slightly southwards, where it receives Otunski potok and Prolaz, and then turns westwards. After making a bend at the mouth of the Prolaz river, Neretvica receives Obaščica from the southeast, and Mala Neretvica and Zagrejčica from the north, then turns south near Salaković, where it flows through Gornji and Donji Čažanj. There it receives the tributary Gorovnik. It then flows past the villages of Lukšije, Parsovići, Donji Prijeslop, Podhum, Gostovići and enters Buturović Polje, where it flows into the bay of Jablanica Lake. The shape of the Neretvica mouth is an estuary.

== Further readings ==
- Izgradnja mHE na rijeci Neretvici: Završena prva faza geoistražnih radova
