= Mrakovo =

Mrakovo may refer to:

- Mrakovo (Ilijaš) a settlement in Ilijaš municipality of Bosnia and Herzegovina
- Mrakovo, Jablanica, a settlement in Jablanica municipality of Bosnia and Herzegovina
- Mrakovo, Russia (disambiguation), the name of several rural localities in Russia
