= List of settlements in the Federation of Bosnia and Herzegovina/J =

== Ja ==
Jablanica (Herzegovina-Neretva Canton), Jabuka, Jabuka, Jagodići, Jajce, Jarovići, Jasenica, Jasenik, Javorik

== Je ==
Jelačići, Jezero, Ježeprosina

== Jo ==
Jošanica
