= Krstac =

Krstac may refer to:

- Krstač, an ancient variety of grape
- Krstac (mountain), a mountain in Serbia
- Krstac (Čajniče), a village in Bosnia and Herzegovina
- Krstac, Jablanica, a village in Bosnia and Herzegovina
- Krstac (Lučani), a village in Serbia
- Krstac (Sjenica), a village in Serbia
