= RTV Jablanica =

- Country: Bosnia and Herzegovina
- Broadcast area: Jablanica
- Headquarters: Jablanica

Programming
- Language(s): Bosnian language
- Picture format: 4:3 576i SDTV

Ownership
- Owner: JP “RADIO TELEVIZIJA JABLANICA”
- Sister channels: Radio Jablanica

History
- Launched: 1999

Links
- Website: www.rtvjablanica.ba

RTV Jablanica or Televizija Jablanica is a local Bosnian public cable television channel based in Jablanica municipality. It was established in 1999 when local Radio Jablanica started television broadcasting.

RTV Jablanica broadcasts a variety of programs such as local news, local sports, mosaic and documentaries. Program is mainly produced in Bosnian language.

Radio Jablanica is also part of public municipality services.
