= Force 10 from Navarone (film) =

1978 film by Guy Hamilton based on the 1968 novel

Force 10 From Navarone
- US film poster by Brian Bysouth
- Directed by: Guy Hamilton
- Screenplay by: Robin Chapman; Uncredited: George MacDonald Fraser
- Story by: Carl Foreman
- Based on: Force 10 from Navarone; 1968 novel by Alistair MacLean
- Produced by: Oliver A. Unger
- Starring: Robert Shaw; Harrison Ford; Barbara Bach; Edward Fox; Franco Nero; Carl Weathers; Richard Kiel; Alan Badel
- Cinematography: Christopher Challis
- Edited by: Raymond Poulton
- Music by: Ron Goodwin
- Production company: Navarone Productions
- Distributed by: Columbia Pictures (United Kingdom); American International Pictures (North America)
- Release dates: 7 December 1978 (United Kingdom); 8 December 1978 (North America)
- Running time: 118 minutes (release); 126 minutes (restored)
- Countries: United Kingdom; United States
- Language: English
- Budget: US$10.5 million
- Box office: $7.2 million

Force 10 from Navarone is a 1978 action war film loosely based on Alistair MacLean's 1968 novel of the same name. It is a sequel to the 1961 film The Guns of Navarone. The parts of Mallory and Miller are played by Robert Shaw (who died before the film was released), and Edward Fox, succeeding in the roles originally portrayed by Gregory Peck and David Niven. It was directed by Guy Hamilton and also stars Harrison Ford, Carl Weathers, Barbara Bach, Franco Nero (in a role previously played by Tutte Lemkow), and Richard Kiel.

The film gets its title from the Alistair MacLean book of the same name, but bears so little resemblance to the novel that MacLean loosely adapted part of the screenplay into his 1982 book Partisans.

== Plot ==
In 1943, following the destruction of a German fortress on the island of Navarone, Major Keith Mallory and Sergeant Donovan "Dusty" Miller are ordered to eliminate the German spy who betrayed the Navarone mission. The spy is believed to have infiltrated the Yugoslav Partisans under the assumed identity "Captain Lescovar". Mallory and Miller are attached to "Force 10", an American commando unit led by U.S. Army Ranger Lieutenant Colonel Mike Barnsby. They steal a Royal Air Force bomber, joined by Weaver, a U.S. Army Medical Corps sergeant who has escaped Military Police custody. When the bomber is intercepted and shot down over Yugoslavia by Bf 109s, only Barnsby, Mallory, Miller, Weaver, and Lieutenant Doug Reynolds survive the crash.

The survivors are captured by pro-German Chetniks led by Captain Drazak. They tell a German army commander, Major Schroeder, they are actually deserters and that Miller's suitcase, stuffed with high explosives and sabotage gear, contains penicillin which will spoil if exposed. When Schroeder later reveals he opened the case and found only firewood, the commandos claim they buried the drug samples. Schroeder sends Barnsby and Mallory to retrieve them, guarded by his concubine Maritza and three soldiers.

Far from camp, Maritza kills the Germans, reveals she is a partisan and admits to hiding the explosives. She directs Mallory and Barnsby towards a camp commanded by her father, Major Petrovich, but encounter a partisan patrol led by Lescovar which takes them to their camp near a hydroelectric dam. An arch bridge spanning the river ravine will be used by German forces for an impending assault on the partisans. Barnsby reveals the bridge is Force 10's actual target.

Mallory, Lescovar and Marko infiltrate the Chetnik camp disguised as Chetniks escorting captives, in order to rescue Miller. Drazak discovers Maritza helped Miller and Mallory escape and beats her. Schroeder and Reynolds are killed in a firefight, but the others escape with a badly hurt Maritza and the explosives. Miller assesses the explosives as too weak to destroy the solidly built bridge and Mallory suggests demolishing the upstream dam in order to destroy the bridge. An air resupply is arranged, but Lescovar calls for German planes to intercept it. Maritza discovers Lescovar's treachery and is killed before she can warn the others.

Angered by the botched air drop, Petrovich orders the men to be sent to partisan commander Tito's headquarters for transport back to Italy. Accompanied by Lescovar and Marko, the team instead infiltrates a German marshaling yard to steal explosives. Lescovar alerts a German sergeant to their presence. Marko sacrifices himself so the others can escape with Lescovar aboard a train for Sarajevo. Lescovar is questioned, gives himself away and is shot dead by Barnsby, who asks Mallory to return the favour by helping him accomplish Force 10's original mission.

Jumping the train near the dam, the team splits up: Miller and Weaver run a diversion using various gadgets from his briefcase, while Mallory and Barnsby sneak into the dam. Weaver kills Captain Drazak in a knife fight. Mallory and Barnsby blast the concrete dam, and it bursts, releasing a torrent of water that topples the bridge. The German assault is thwarted, saving Petrovich and the partisan guerrillas.

Mallory and Barnsby rejoin Miller and Weaver on the wrong side of the river, and the men begin a strenuous journey back to friendly territory.

== Cast ==
- Robert Shaw as Major Keith Mallory
- Harrison Ford as Lieutenant Colonel Mike Barnsby
- Edward Fox as Staff Sergeant John Miller
- Barbara Bach as Maritza Petrović
- Franco Nero as Captain Lescovar / Colonel Von Ingolsleben, a German Abwehr intelligence officer
- Carl Weathers as Sergeant Olen Weaver
- Richard Kiel as Captain Dražak
- Alan Badel as Major Petrović
- Michael Byrne as Major Schroeder
- Philip Latham as Commander Jensen
- Angus MacInnes as Lieutenant Doug Reynolds
- Michael Sheard as Sergeant Bauer
- Petar Buntic as Marko
- Paul Humpoletz as Sergeant Bismark
- Ramiz Pasic as Mallory's Boy

== Production ==
=== Initial development ===
There had been plans to produce the film shortly after the 1961 film, with Gregory Peck and David Niven reprising their roles. Following the success of the original film, producer Carl Foreman asked MacLean to write a hardcover sequel novel on which a follow-up film would be based, but the author was reluctant to write an entire novel and instead delivered a screen treatment.

In April 1967 Foreman announced he would make After Navarone with Anthony Quinn, Gregory Peck, and David Niven reprising their roles and J Lee Thompson returning as director. The film would be made by Columbia. In May 1967 it was announced the film would be called The High Dam and filming would take place in 1969. Filming, however, did not proceed: MacLean decided to develop the screen treatment as a book; he published Force 10 from Navarone in 1968, and the novel became a best seller.

Throughout the 1970s Foreman tried to get financial backing for the film. In December 1972 MacLean said Foreman's plan was to use the original cast, but commented, "they'll look a bit old for the war now."

=== Financing ===
In September 1976 it was announced Foreman, Oliver Unger and the German finance company, Mondo Films, had acquired the screen rights to the novel and screenplay Force 10 from Navarone. Foreman wrote the treatment and served as executive producer, but Unger wound up producing.

The producers wanted Robert Bolt to write the screenplay but he was busy working with David Lean. Bolt's agent Peggy Ramsey suggested they hire Robin Chapman.

In August 1977, the production company set up to make the movie, Navarone Productions, signed an agreement with AIP for the latter to distribute the film. AIP provided $2.1 million of the budget.

The film was originally budgeted at $8,312,224. AIP provided $2,104,942.93 to Navarone Productions and subsequently spent an additional $97,109.15 to produce a U.S. version of the film. Columbia Pictures advanced $2.9 million and agreed to pay an additional $1.1 million after delivery of the film in return for the exclusive and perpetual distribution rights in all territories outside the United States and Canada. A German investment group contributed $1 million, a Yugoslavian production company lent or provided services equal to $2 million; and American Broadcasting Company paid $1.8 million for the right to broadcast the motion picture three times on network television.

Cinematographer Christopher Challis recalled that the producers originally considered filming in Pakistan before concluding that Pakistanis did not resemble Yugoslavians or Germans and the expense to make them appear as such on film would be financially prohibitive.

=== Casting ===
By the time filming was to start, 17 years after the original, Peck and Niven were considered too old and the decision was made to recast.

By October 1977 the main cast had been settled: Robert Shaw, Edward Fox, Harrison Ford, Franco Nero, Barbara Bach. Shaw said "I find it a bit ridiculous at my age to be running around a mountain in Yugoslavia saying 'Let's go'."

It was Ford's first film after the release of Star Wars. He says he picked the part because it was a "strong supporting character" that was "very different from Han Solo. I wanted to avoid being stereotyped as a science fiction type." Ford later said he did the film "to take advantage of the chance to work. And it was a job I did for the money."

Fox at the time was best known for The Day of the Jackal and playing Edward VIII on television. Caroline Munro said she was offered the female lead but she turned it down because it involved too much nudity.

MacLean was reportedly unhappy with the prominence given to the Barbara Bach character. "She's of minimal importance in my novel," he said.

=== Filming ===
Filming went for five months starting in late 1977. Shepperton Studios outside London were used for most indoor scenes and included a full-scale mock-up of a Lancaster bomber, while scenes were shot around the Đurđevića Tara Bridge, Montenegro, and Jablanica Dam on Jablaničko Lake in Jablanica, Bosnia and Herzegovina with the assistance of Jadran Film. Scale models of the dam, the valley and the bridge were constructed at the Mediterranean Film Studios in Malta.

President Tito of Yugoslavia authorised his government to assist the production, including providing 2,000 soldiers as extras as well as uniforms and equipment and several Yugoslavian army T-34 tanks. He visited the set.

Some scenes were also shot in the Royal Naval Dockyard (South Yard) in Devonport, Plymouth. During a shot of the railway carriages the letters PSTO(N) can be seen, this stands for Principal Supply and Transport Officer (Navy), and is on Jersey in the Channel Islands.

George MacDonald Fraser was hired to do further work on the script during filming in Yugoslavia, in part because he and Guy Hamilton got along well when both worked on Superman (1978). However, Fraser is not credited on the film.

Edward Fox said five people worked on the script. "The action had been laid down but the characters were still stick figures. We had to dress them up and make the lines fit them as we went along."

Ford said during filming, "I was lost because I didn't know what the story was about. I didn't have anything to act. There was no reason for my character being there. I had no part of the story that was important to tell. I had a hard time taking the stage with the bull that I was supposed to be doing."

The bridge over the Tara River, which is the target of the commando operation in the film, was destroyed by partisans in 1942 with the original engineer that built the bridge (Lazar Jauković) involved in the operation to destroy it.

Shaw said during filming that "I'm seriously thinking that this might be my last film. I no longer have anything real to say. I'm appalled at some of the lines. I'm not at ease in film. I can't remember the last film I enjoyed making." Shaw's words proved prophetic as he died in August 1978 of a heart attack, before Navarone was released. It was his penultimate film, as he was filming Avalanche Express when he died.

Filming went over budget to more than $10 million and the completion guarantor had to step in and provide additional funds.

=== Musical score ===
Composer Ron Goodwin scored the film to the 126-minute version during the summer of 1978. Before the film was released it was shortened to 118 minutes. Additional music cues were created by recycling music from other parts of the film – typically reusing suspense passages in scenes for which they were not written. The CD release of the soundtrack by Film Score Monthly chronicles these changes, and presents the score as Goodwin wrote and recorded it for the 126-minute version.

== Release ==
After being screened at Camp David as the Thanksgiving film for US President Jimmy Carter, the film was released in the United States on 8 December 1978 to mixed reviews (according to production notes that accompanied the 2000 DVD release).

Before the film came out Maclean said in an interview that the only film he liked made from his writings was Guns of Navarone and "I am hopeful this return to Navarone will be good too, although the storyline bears little resemblance to what I wrote. Robert Shaw was a good actor, one of the most in demand in the world today. And I am told he did a good job. Whatever, this couldn't help be the best [of the recent adaptations of his work for the screen] because the rest were rubbish. But I am not bitter, you understand. The sale of my stories to the movies has been a matter of business – a process from which I usually detach myself."

The 118-minute cut was released theatrically overseas by Columbia Pictures, which had released The Guns of Navarone.

== Reception ==
On the review aggregator website Rotten Tomatoes, 68% of 22 critics' reviews are positive. Metacritic, which uses a weighted average, assigned the film a score of 42 out of 100, based on seven critics, indicating "mixed or average" reviews.

Roger Ebert of the Chicago Sun-Times gave the film 2 1/2 out of 4 stars and wrote, "[A] director like Guy Hamilton, a graduate of four of the Bond pictures, can turn out action movies like this in his sleep. This time, alas, that's apparently what he did."

Harrison Ford said, "It wasn't a bad film. There were honest people involved and it was an honest effort. But it wasn't the right thing for me to do."

=== Box office ===
The film made a quarter of what the original did at the box office, and less than a third of its budget.

== Legal action ==
Although three producers of the film are deceased (Carl Foreman, Sidney Cohn and Oliver Unger), their estates and surviving producer Peter Gettinger sued Sony Pictures (owner of Columbia Pictures) for unpaid sums from distribution rights. Following a May 2008 trial in the New York Supreme Court, a judgement awarded the producers more than 30 years of funds withheld by Columbia Pictures. Sony appealed, but the Appellate Division of the Supreme Court upheld the initial verdict on 1 September 2009.
