= Ostrožac, Jablanica =

Ostrožac
- Village
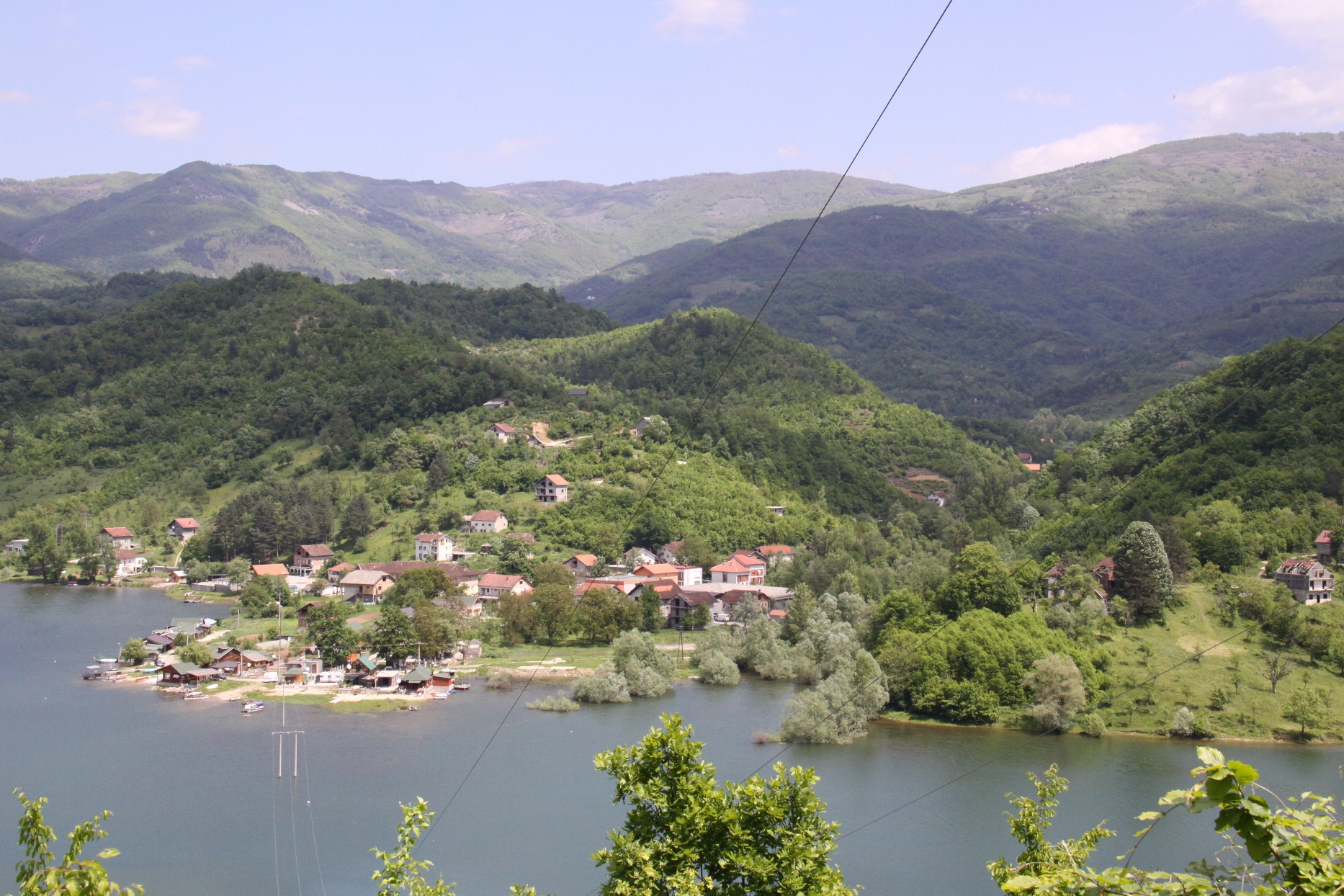

- Location within Bosnia and Herzegovina
- Country: Bosnia and Herzegovina
- Entity: Federation of Bosnia and Herzegovina
- Canton: Herzegovina-Neretva
- Municipality: Jablanica

Area
  - Total: 2.12 sq mi (5.48 km^{2})

Population (2013)
  - Total: 738
  - Density: 349/sq mi (135/km^{2})
- Time zone: UTC+1 (CET)
  - Summer (DST): UTC+2 (CEST)

Ostrožac is a village in the municipality of Jablanica, Bosnia and Herzegovina. It is located on the south banks of Jablaničko lake.

== Demographics ==
According to the 2013 census, its population was 738 (97.6% Bosniak).

Ethnicity in 2013
Ethnicity	Number	Percentage
Bosniaks	720	97.6%
Croats	6	0.8%
Serbs	1	0.1%
Other or undeclared	11	1.5%
Total	738	100%
