= Jablanica Dam =

Dam in Herzegovina-Neretva, Bosnia Herzegovina

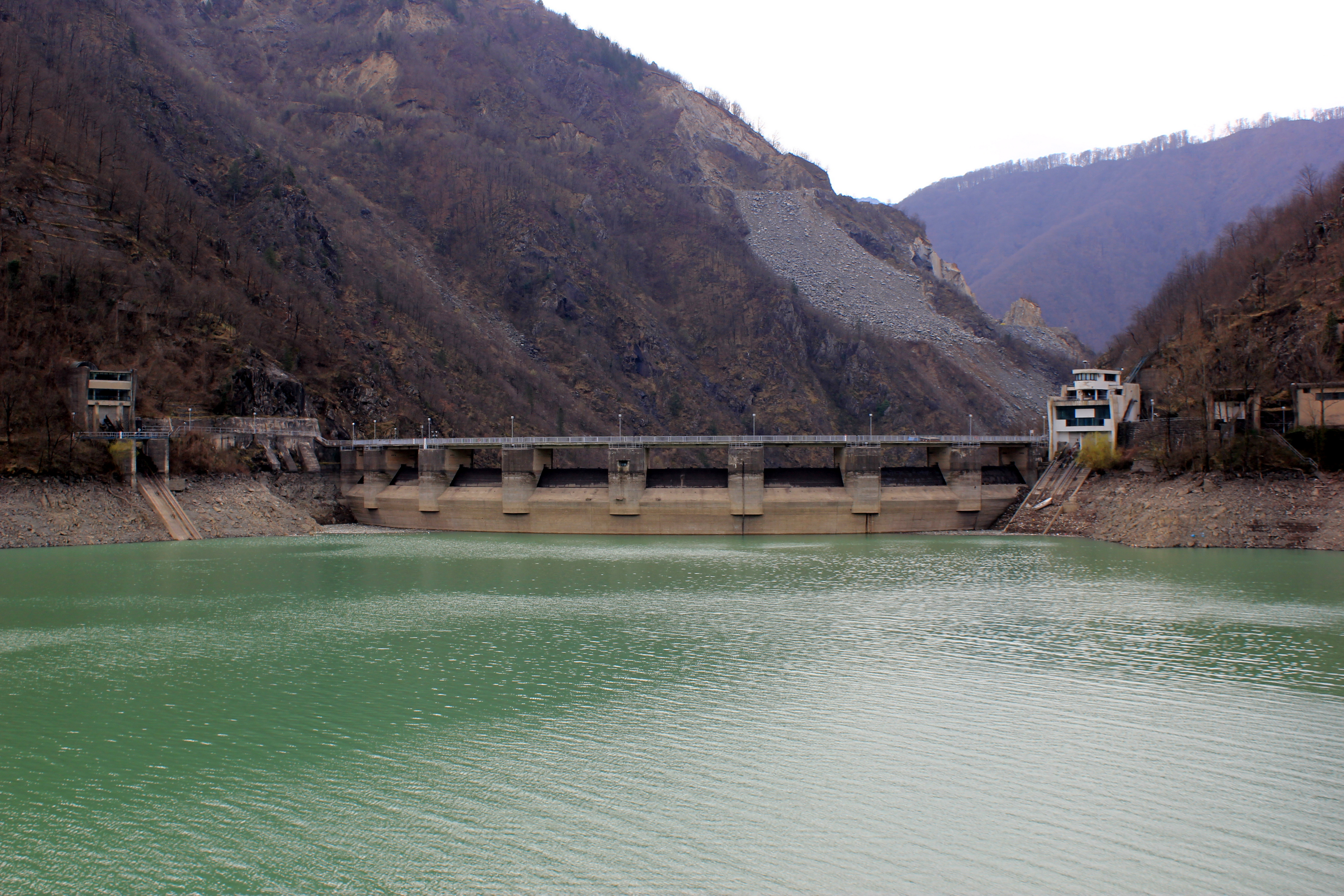

- Location within Bosnia and Herzegovina
- Interactive map of Jablanica Dam
- Country: Bosnia and Herzegovina
- Location: Jablanica, Herzegovina-Neretva Canton
- Coordinates: 43°41′32.79″N 17°43′57.05″E
- Purpose: Electricity generation
- Status: Operational
- Construction began: 1947
- Opening date: 1955; 71 years ago
- Owner: Government of the FBiH

Dam and spillways
- Type of dam: Arch-gravity
- Impounds: Neretva River
- Height: 85 m (279 ft)

Reservoir
- Creates: Jablanica lake
- Total capacity: 290,000,000 m^{3} (240,000 acre⋅ft)
- Surface area: 13.2 km^{2} (5.1 mi^{2})

Jablanica Hydro Power Plant
- Coordinates: 43°39′46.84″N 17°45′59.20″E
- Operator: JP "Elektroprivreda BiH"
- Commission date: 1955-1958
- Type: Diversion
- Hydraulic head: 111 m (364 ft)
- Turbines: 6 x 30 MW Francis-type
- Installed capacity: 180 MW
- Annual generation: 770 GWh

The Jablanica Dam is an arch-gravity dam on the Neretva River about 4 km (2.5 mi) northwest of Jablanica in the Herzegovina-Neretva Canton of Bosnia and Herzegovina. The dam was constructed between 1947 and 1955 with the primary purpose of hydroelectric power production. The power station was commissioned in two stages, from 1955 until 1958. The first generator was commissioned in February 1955. An upgrade in 2008 increased the installed capacity of the power station from 150 MW to 180 MW. The dam's power station is located about 4.4 km (2.7 mi) to the southeast near Jablanica and discharges back into the Neretva River. It contains six 30 MW Francis turbine-generators for an installed capacity of 180 MW. The difference in elevation between the reservoir and power station affords a hydraulic head (water drop) of 111 m (364 ft). The dam is 85 m (279 ft) tall and creates Jablanica lake. The dam and power station are owned and operated by Elektroprivreda Bosne i Hercegovine.

== In media ==
The dam was used for the 1978 action film, Force 10 from Navarone.

== See also ==
- List of hydroelectric power plants in Bosnia and Herzegovina
