= Radio Jablanica =

Bosnian radio station

Jablanica; Bosnia and Herzegovina
- Broadcast area: Herzegovina-Neretva Canton
- Frequency: Jablanica 94.7 MHz
- Branding: Public

Programming
- Language: Bosnian language
- Format: Local news, talk and music

Ownership
- Owner: JP RTV JABLANICA d.o.o. Jablanica
- Sister stations: TV Jablanica

History
- First air date: February 24, 1999
- Call sign meaning: JABLANICA

Technical information
- Transmitter coordinates: 43°39′N 17°45′E
- Repeater: Jablanica/Čeharski vrh

Links
- Webcast: On website
- Website: rtvjablanica.ba

Radio Jablanica is a Bosnian local public radio station, broadcasting from Jablanica, Bosnia and Herzegovina.

It was launched on 22 February 1999 by JP RTV JABLANICA d.o.o. Jablanica. This radio station broadcasts a variety of programs such as music, talk shows and local news.

Program is mainly produced in Bosnian language. Estimated number of potential listeners of Radio Jablanica is around 13,498.

The radio station is also available in municipalities Konjic, Prozor and Mostar. Local cable television channel RTV Jablanica is also part of public municipality services.

== Frequencies ==
- Jablanica 94.7 MHz

== See also ==
- List of radio stations in Bosnia and Herzegovina
