= Mrakovo, Russia =

Mrakovo, Russia (Russian: Мраково) may refer to:

- Mrakovo, Gafuriysky District, Republic of Bashkortostan, a selo in Gafuriysky District
- Mrakovo, Kugarchinsky District, Republic of Bashkortostan, a selo in Kugarchinsky District

== See also ==
- Mrakovo (disambiguation)
