= Žuglići =

- Village
- Location within Bosnia and Herzegovina
- Country: Bosnia and Herzegovina
- Entity: Federation of Bosnia and Herzegovina
- Canton: Herzegovina-Neretva
- Municipality: Jablanica

Area
  - Total: 0.69 sq mi (1.79 km^{2})

Population (2013)
  - Total: 42
  - Density: 61/sq mi (23/km^{2})
- Time zone: UTC+1 (CET)
  - Summer (DST): UTC+2 (CEST)

Žuglići is a village in the municipality of Jablanica, Bosnia and Herzegovina. It is located on the north shore of Jablaničko lake

== Demographics ==
According to the 2013 census, its population was 42, all Bosniaks.
