= Sovići, Jablanica =

Sovići
- Village
- Location within Bosnia and Herzegovina
- Country: Bosnia and Herzegovina
- Entity: Federation of Bosnia and Herzegovina
- Canton: Herzegovina-Neretva
- Municipality: Jablanica

Area
  - Total: 11.52 sq mi (29.83 km^{2})

Population (2013)
  - Total: 250
  - Density: 22/sq mi (8.4/km^{2})
- Time zone: UTC+1 (CET)
  - Summer (DST): UTC+2 (CEST)

Sovići is a village in the municipality of Jablanica, Bosnia and Herzegovina.

== Demographics ==
According to the 2013 census, its population was 250.

Ethnicity in 2013
Ethnicity	Number	Percentage
Bosniaks	141	56.4%
Croats	109	43.6%
Total	250	100%
