= Baćina, Jablanica =

Baćina
- Village
- Location within Bosnia and Herzegovina
- Country: Bosnia and Herzegovina
- Entity: Federation of Bosnia and Herzegovina
- Canton: Herzegovina-Neretva
- Municipality: Jablanica

Area
  - Total: 1.72 sq mi (4.45 km^{2})

Population (2013)
  - Total: 209
  - Density: 122/sq mi (47.0/km^{2})
- Time zone: UTC+1 (CET)
  - Summer (DST): UTC+2 (CEST)

Baćina is a village in the municipality of Jablanica, Bosnia and Herzegovina.

== Demographics ==
According to the 2013 census, its population was 209.

Ethnicity in 2013
Ethnicity	Number	Percentage
Bosniaks	208	99.5%
other/undeclared	1	0.5%
Total	209	100%
