= Lug, Jablanica =

Lug
- Village
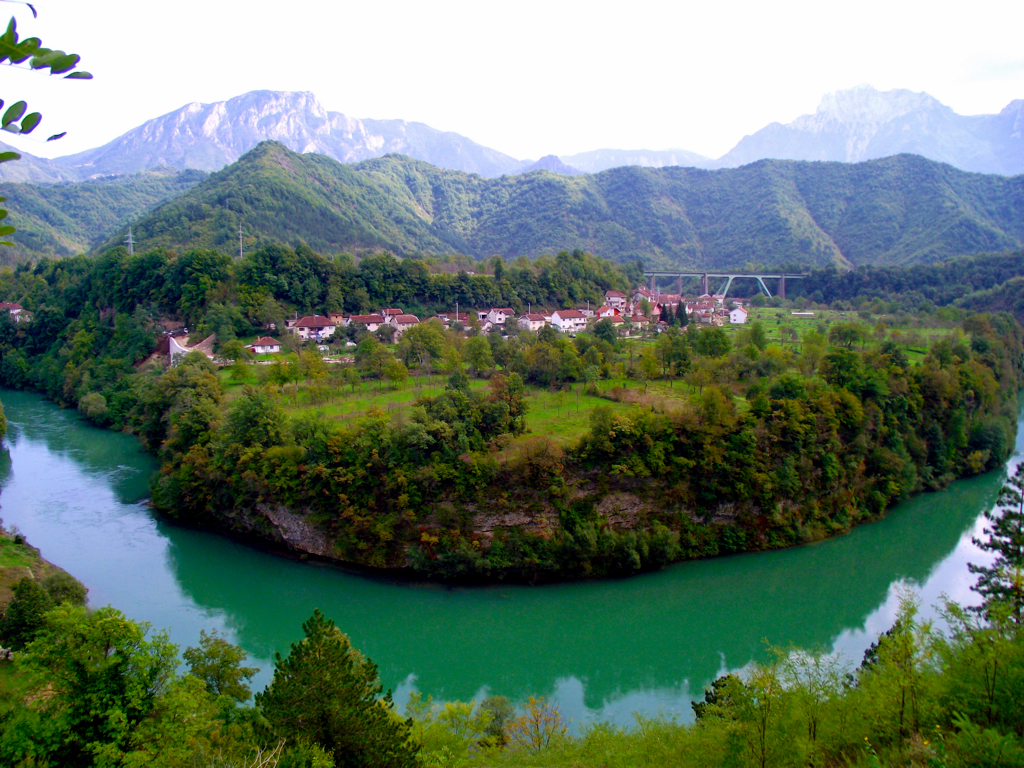

- Location within Bosnia and Herzegovina
- Country: Bosnia and Herzegovina
- Entity: Federation of Bosnia and Herzegovina
- Canton: Herzegovina-Neretva
- Municipality: Jablanica

Area
  - Total: 1.86 sq mi (4.82 km^{2})

Population (2013)
  - Total: 380
  - Density: 200/sq mi (79/km^{2})
- Time zone: UTC+1 (CET)
  - Summer (DST): UTC+2 (CEST)

Lug is a village in the municipality of Jablanica, Bosnia and Herzegovina. It is located along the Neretva river.

== Demographics ==
According to the 2013 census, its population was 380.

Ethnicity in 2013
Ethnicity	Number	Percentage
Bosniaks	363	95.5%
other/undeclared	17	4.5%
Total	380	100%
