= Šanica =

- Village
- Location within Bosnia and Herzegovina
- Country: Bosnia and Herzegovina
- Entity: Federation of Bosnia and Herzegovina
- Canton: Herzegovina-Neretva
- Municipality: Jablanica

Area
  - Total: 5.83 sq mi (15.10 km^{2})

Population (2013)
  - Total: 87
  - Density: 15/sq mi (5.8/km^{2})
- Time zone: UTC+1 (CET)
  - Summer (DST): UTC+2 (CEST)

Šanica is a village in the municipality of Jablanica, Bosnia and Herzegovina.

== Demographics ==
According to the 2013 census, its population was 87, all Bosniaks.
