= Bijela, Jablanica =

Bijela
- Village
- Location within Bosnia and Herzegovina
- Country: Bosnia and Herzegovina
- Entity: Federation of Bosnia and Herzegovina
- Canton: Herzegovina-Neretva
- Municipality: Jablanica

Area
  - Total: 4.94 sq mi (12.79 km^{2})

Population (2013)
  - Total: 111
  - Density: 22.5/sq mi (8.68/km^{2})
- Time zone: UTC+1 (CET)
  - Summer (DST): UTC+2 (CEST)

Bijela is a village in the municipality of Jablanica, Bosnia and Herzegovina.

== Demographics ==
According to the 2013 census, its population was 111.

Ethnicity in 2013
| Ethnicity | Number | Percentage |
|---|---|---|
| Bosniaks | 104 | 93.7% |
| other/undeclared | 7 | 6.3% |
| Total | 111 | 100% |
