= Čivelj =

- Village
- Location within Bosnia and Herzegovina
- Country: Bosnia and Herzegovina
- Entity: Federation of Bosnia and Herzegovina
- Canton: Herzegovina-Neretva
- Municipality: Jablanica

Area
  - Total: 0.93 sq mi (2.40 km^{2})

Population (2013)
  - Total: 11
  - Density: 12/sq mi (4.6/km^{2})
- Time zone: UTC+1 (CET)
  - Summer (DST): UTC+2 (CEST)

Čivelj is a village in Bosnia and Herzegovina. It is located in the municipality of Jablanica, Herzegovina-Neretva Canton, Federation of Bosnia and Herzegovina. In 1991, the village had six inhabitants, all of whom were Muslims.

Tourism is solid. Civelj is placed 8 kilometres from Jablanica and it is placed on Jablanica lake. In lake there are 5 types of fishes including the most popular "pastrmka".

The village was found in 1911. by local fishermen. Near Civelj is water gate Jablanica. Local inhabitants are kind and friendly. Civelj is also a good place for camping.

== Demographics ==
According to the 2013 census, its population was 11, all Bosniaks.

== See also ==
- List of cities in Bosnia and Herzegovina
- Municipalities of Bosnia and Herzegovina
