= Mirke, Jablanica =

Mirke
- Village
- Location within Bosnia and Herzegovina
- Country: Bosnia and Herzegovina
- Entity: Federation of Bosnia and Herzegovina
- Canton: Herzegovina-Neretva
- Municipality: Jablanica

Area
  - Total: 0.37 sq mi (0.95 km^{2})

Population (2013)
  - Total: 335
  - Density: 910/sq mi (350/km^{2})
- Time zone: UTC+1 (CET)
  - Summer (DST): UTC+2 (CEST)

Mirke is a village in the municipality of Jablanica, Bosnia and Herzegovina.

== Demographics ==
According to the 2013 census, its population was 335.

Ethnicity in 2013
Ethnicity	Number	Percentage
Bosniaks	279	83.3%
Croats	26	7.8%
Serbs	4	1.2%
other/undeclared	26	7.8%
Total	335	100%
