= Gornje Paprasko =

- Village
- Location within Bosnia and Herzegovina
- Country: Bosnia and Herzegovina
- Entity: Federation of Bosnia and Herzegovina
- Canton: Herzegovina-Neretva
- Municipality: Jablanica

Area
  - Total: 1.24 sq mi (3.20 km^{2})

Population (2013)
  - Total: 97
  - Density: 79/sq mi (30/km^{2})
- Time zone: UTC+1 (CET)
  - Summer (DST): UTC+2 (CEST)

Gornje Paprasko is a village in the municipality of Jablanica, Bosnia and Herzegovina.

== Demographics ==
According to the 2013 census, its population was 97.

Ethnicity in 2013
Ethnicity	Number	Percentage
Bosniaks	92	94.8%
other/undeclared	5	5.2%
Total	97	100%
