= Glodnica, Jablanica =

Glodnica
- Village
- Location within Bosnia and Herzegovina
- Country: Bosnia and Herzegovina
- Entity: Federation of Bosnia and Herzegovina
- Canton: Herzegovina-Neretva
- Municipality: Jablanica

Area
  - Total: 1.42 sq mi (3.69 km^{2})

Population (2013)
  - Total: 158
  - Density: 111/sq mi (42.8/km^{2})
- Time zone: UTC+1 (CET)
  - Summer (DST): UTC+2 (CEST)

Glodnica is a village in the municipality of Jablanica, Bosnia and Herzegovina.

== Demographics ==
According to the 2013 census, its population was 158.

Ethnicity in 2013
Ethnicity	Number	Percentage
Bosniaks	152	96.2%
other/undeclared	6	3.8%
Total	158	100%
