= Donje Paprasko =

- Village
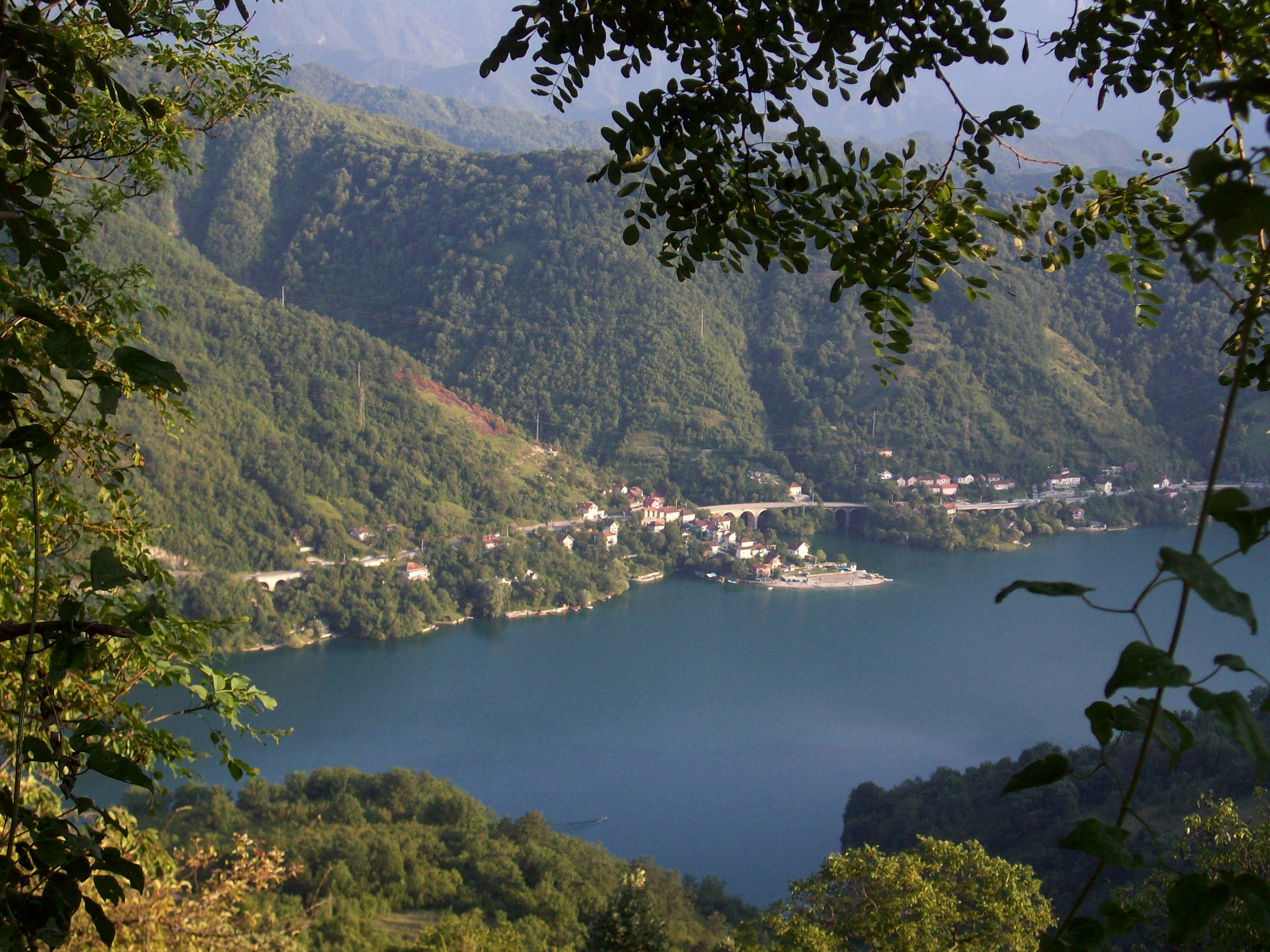

- Location within Bosnia and Herzegovina
- Country: Bosnia and Herzegovina
- Entity: Federation of Bosnia and Herzegovina
- Canton: Herzegovina-Neretva
- Municipality: Jablanica

Area
  - Total: 1.02 sq mi (2.63 km^{2})

Population (2013)
  - Total: 234
  - Density: 230/sq mi (89.0/km^{2})
- Time zone: UTC+1 (CET)
  - Summer (DST): UTC+2 (CEST)

Donje Paprasko is a village in Bosnia and Herzegovina. It is located in the municipality of Jablanica, Herzegovina-Neretva Canton. The settlement is bordered by the Jablanica lake. The settlement is a popular summer destination.

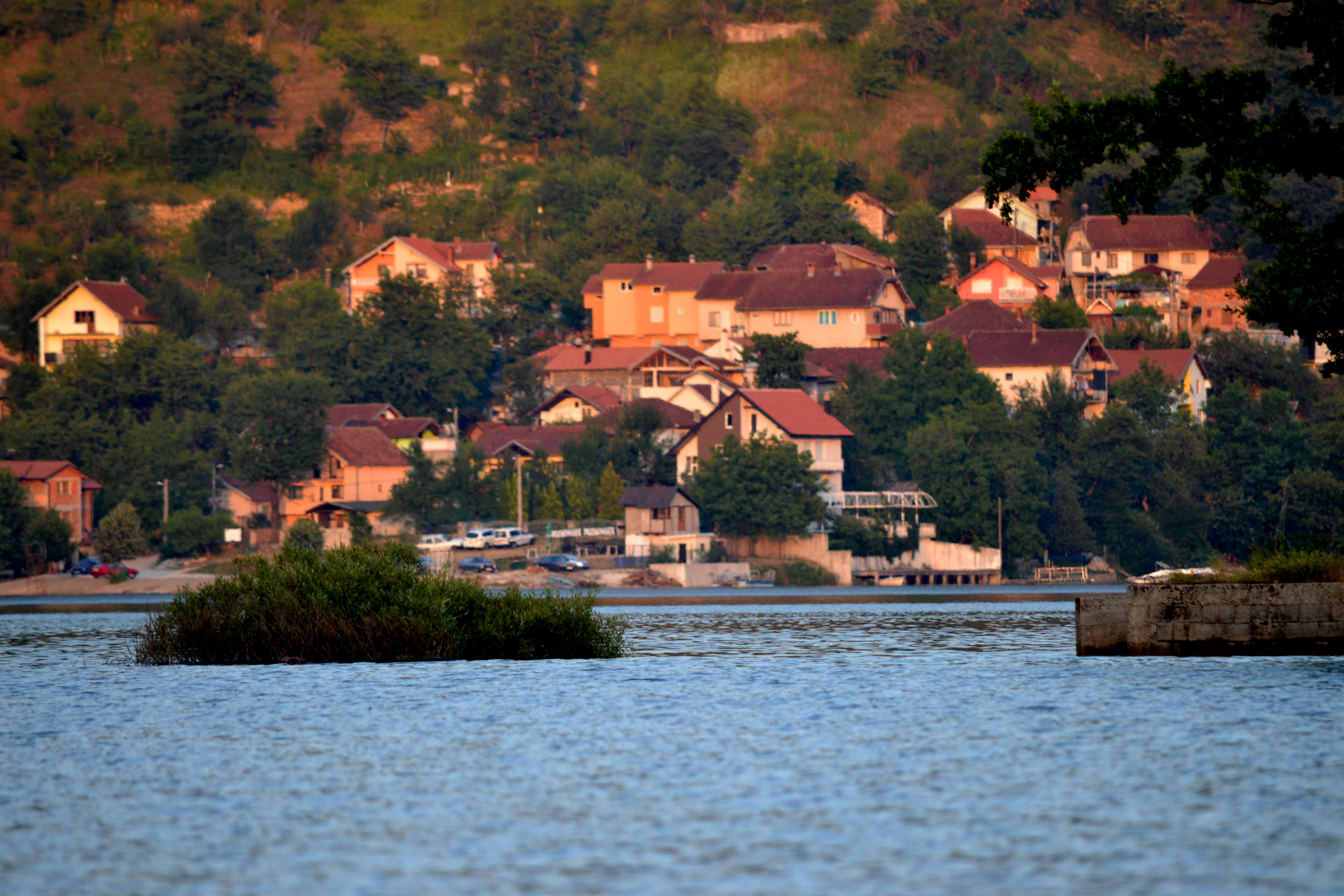
Donje Paprasko, Bosnia and Herzegovina.

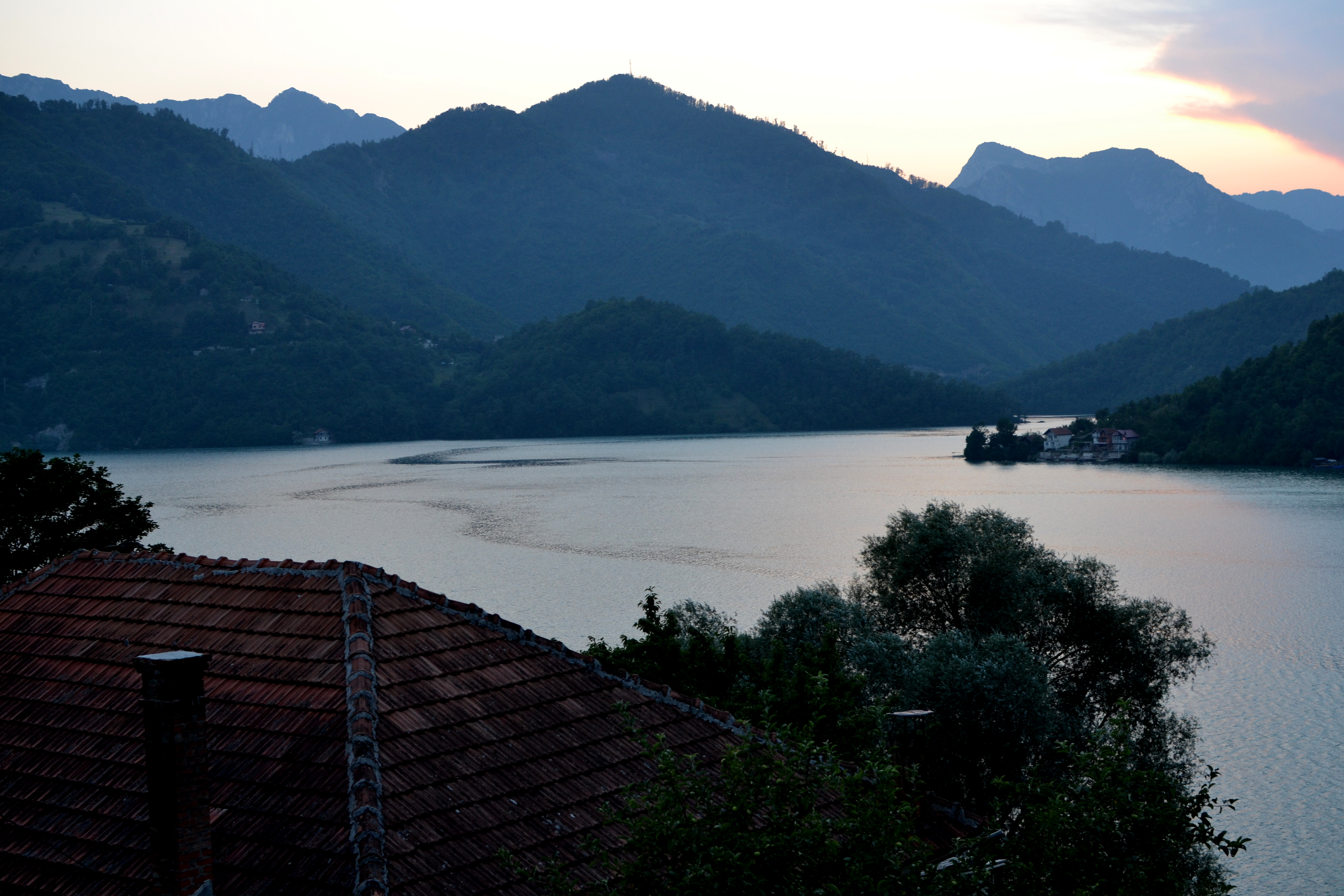
Donje Paprasko, Lake View, Bosnia and Herzegovina

== Demographics ==
=== 1879 ===
56 total

- Male – 23 (41.07%)
- Female – 33 (58.93%)

=== 1971 ===
277 total

- Bosniaks – 246 (88.80%)
- Serbs – 20 (7.22%)
- Yugoslavs – 11 (3.97%)

According to the 2013 census, its population was 209.

Ethnicity in 2013
Ethnicity	Number	Percentage
Bosniaks	229	97.9%
Croats	1	0.4%
other/undeclared	4	1.7%
Total	234	100%
