= Zlate, Jablanica =

Zlate
- Village
- Location within Bosnia and Herzegovina
- Country: Bosnia and Herzegovina
- Entity: Federation of Bosnia and Herzegovina
- Canton: Herzegovina-Neretva
- Municipality: Jablanica

Area
  - Total: 1.08 sq mi (2.79 km^{2})

Population (2013)
  - Total: 211
  - Density: 196/sq mi (75.6/km^{2})
- Time zone: UTC+1 (CET)
  - Summer (DST): UTC+2 (CEST)

Zlate is a village in the municipality of Jablanica, Bosnia and Herzegovina.

== Demographics ==
According to the 2013 census, its population was 211.

Ethnicity in 2013
Ethnicity	Number	Percentage
Bosniaks	205	97.2%
Croats	1	0.5%
Serbs	1	0.5%
other/undeclared	4	1.9%
Total	211	100%
