= Slatina, Jablanica =

Slatina слатина
- Village
- Location within Bosnia and Herzegovina
- Country: Bosnia and Herzegovina
- Entity: Federation of Bosnia and Herzegovina
- Canton: Herzegovina-Neretva
- Municipality: Jablanica

Area
  - Total: 2.52 sq mi (6.52 km^{2})

Population (2013)
  - Total: 416
  - Density: 165/sq mi (63.8/km^{2})
- Time zone: UTC+1 (CET)
  - Summer (DST): UTC+2 (CEST)

Slatina is a village in the municipality of Jablanica, Bosnia and Herzegovina.

== Demographics ==
According to the 2013 census, its population was 416.

Ethnicity in 2013
| Ethnicity | Number | Percentage |
|---|---|---|
| Bosniaks | 312 | 75.0% |
| Croats | 96 | 23.1% |
| other/undeclared | 8 | 1.9% |
| Total | 416 | 100% |
