= Lendava, Jablanica =

Lendava
- Village
- Location within Bosnia and Herzegovina
- Country: Bosnia and Herzegovina
- Entity: Federation of Bosnia and Herzegovina
- Canton: Herzegovina-Neretva
- Municipality: Jablanica

Area
  - Total: 0.41 sq mi (1.05 km^{2})

Population (2013)
  - Total: 56
  - Density: 140/sq mi (53/km^{2})
- Time zone: UTC+1 (CET)
  - Summer (DST): UTC+2 (CEST)

Lendava is a village in the municipality of Jablanica, Bosnia and Herzegovina.

== Demographics ==
According to the 2013 census, its population was 56, all Bosniaks.
