= Dragan Selo =

- Village
- Location within Bosnia and Herzegovina
- Country: Bosnia and Herzegovina
- Entity: Federation of Bosnia and Herzegovina
- Canton: Herzegovina-Neretva
- Municipality: Jablanica

Area
  - Total: 1.36 sq mi (3.52 km^{2})

Population (2013)
  - Total: 178
  - Density: 131/sq mi (50.6/km^{2})
- Time zone: UTC+1 (CET)
  - Summer (DST): UTC+2 (CEST)

Dragan Selo is a village in the municipality of Jablanica, Bosnia and Herzegovina.

== Demographics ==
According to the 2013 census, its population was 178.

Ethnicity in 2013
Ethnicity	Number	Percentage
Bosniaks	174	97.8%
other/undeclared	4	2.2%
Total	178	100%
