= Djevor =

- Village
- Location within Bosnia and Herzegovina
- Country: Bosnia and Herzegovina
- Entity: Federation of Bosnia and Herzegovina
- Canton: Herzegovina-Neretva
- Municipality: Jablanica

Area
  - Total: 0.41 sq mi (1.06 km^{2})

Population (2013)
  - Total: 275
  - Density: 672/sq mi (259/km^{2})
- Time zone: UTC+1 (CET)
  - Summer (DST): UTC+2 (CEST)

Djevor is a village in the municipality of Jablanica, Bosnia and Herzegovina.

== Demographics ==
According to the 2013 census, its population was 275.

Ethnicity in 2013
Ethnicity	Number	Percentage
Bosniaks	259	94.2%
other/undeclared	16	5.8%
Total	275	100%
