= Donje Peulje =

Donje Peulje Доње Пеуље
- Village
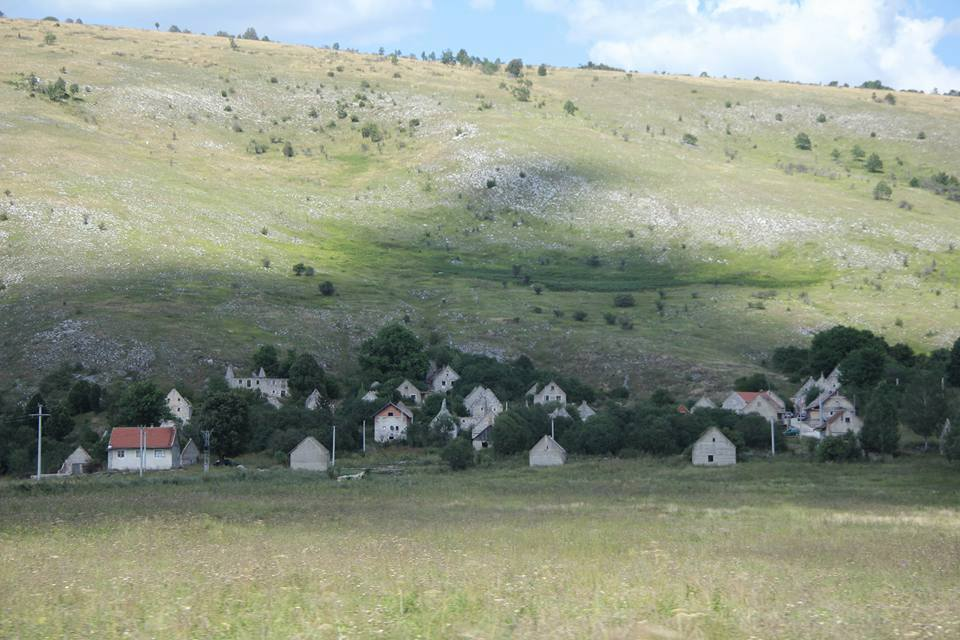
- Donje Peulje

- Location within Bosnia and Herzegovina
- Coordinates: 44°07′49″N 16°31′06″E
- Country: Bosnia and Herzegovina
- Entity: Federation of Bosnia and Herzegovina
- Canton: Canton 10
- Municipality: Bosansko Grahovo

Area
  - Total: 34.98 km^{2} (13.51 sq mi)

Population (2013)
  - Total: 33
  - Density: 0.94/km^{2} (2.4/sq mi)
- Time zone: UTC+1 (CET)
  - Summer (DST): UTC+2 (CEST)

Donje Peulje (Serbian Cyrillic: Доње Пеуље) is a village in the Municipality of Bosansko Grahovo in Canton 10 of the Federation of Bosnia and Herzegovina, an entity of Bosnia and Herzegovina.

== Demographics ==
According to the 2013 census, its population was 33.

Ethnicity in 2013
Ethnicity	Number	Percentage
Serbs	30	90.91%
Total	33	100%

=== Population ===
Historical population

Year	Pop.	±%
1948		—
1953		—
1961	477	—
1971	321	−32.7%

Year	Pop.	±%
1981	467	+45.5%
1991	323	−30.8%
2013	33	−89.8%
2021		—

== Bibliography ==
- Ethnicity/National Affiliation, Religion and Mother Tongue (PDF). Sarajevo: Agency for Statistics of Bosnia and Herzegovina. 2019.
