= Mrakovo, Gafuriysky District, Republic of Bashkortostan =

Mrakovo Мраково
- Selo
- Location within Bashkortostan Location within Russia
- Coordinates: 53°47′N 56°11′E
- Country: Russia
- Region: Bashkortostan
- District: Gafuriysky District
- Time zone: UTC+5:00

Mrakovo (Russian: Мраково; Bashkir: Мораҡ, Moraq) is a rural locality (a selo) and the administrative centre of Mrakovsky Selsoviet, Gafuriysky District, Bashkortostan, Russia. The population was 634 as of 2010. There are 14 streets.

== Geography ==
Mrakovo is located 34 km southwest of Krasnousolsky (the district's administrative centre) by road. Novotroyevka is the nearest rural locality.
