= Krstac, Jablanica =

Krstac Крстац
- Village
- Location within Bosnia and Herzegovina
- Country: Bosnia and Herzegovina
- Entity: Federation of Bosnia and Herzegovina
- Canton: Herzegovina-Neretva
- Municipality: Jablanica

Area
  - Total: 3.33 sq mi (8.62 km^{2})

Population (2013)
  - Total: 143
  - Density: 43.0/sq mi (16.6/km^{2})
- Time zone: UTC+1 (CET)
  - Summer (DST): UTC+2 (CEST)

Krstac is a village in the municipality of Jablanica, Bosnia and Herzegovina.

== Demographics ==
According to the 2013 census, its population was 143, all Bosniaks.
