= Mrakovo, Jablanica =

Mrakovo
- Village
- Location within Bosnia and Herzegovina
- Country: Bosnia and Herzegovina
- Entity: Federation of Bosnia and Herzegovina
- Canton: Herzegovina-Neretva
- Municipality: Jablanica

Area
  - Total: 1.93 sq mi (5.00 km^{2})

Population (2013)
  - Total: 83
  - Density: 43/sq mi (17/km^{2})
- Time zone: UTC+1 (CET)
  - Summer (DST): UTC+2 (CEST)

Mrakovo is a village in the municipality of Jablanica, Bosnia and Herzegovina.

== Demographics ==
According to the 2013 census, its population was 83.

Ethnicity in 2013
Ethnicity	Number	Percentage
Bosniaks	81	97.6%
other/undeclared	2	2.4%
Total	83	100%
