= Podhum, Konjic =

Podhum
- Village
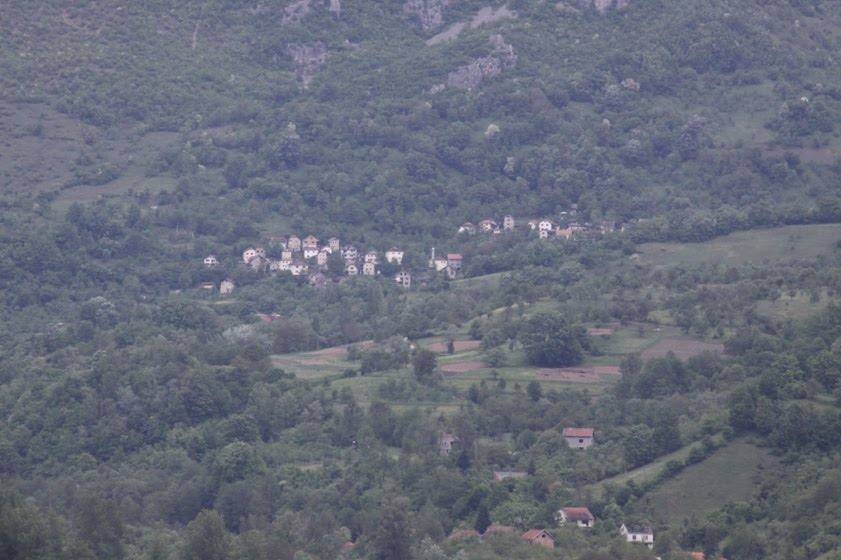

- Location within Bosnia and Herzegovina
- Coordinates: 43°45′06″N 17°49′10″E
- Country: Bosnia and Herzegovina
- Entity: Federation of Bosnia and Herzegovina
- Canton: Herzegovina-Neretva
- Municipality: Konjic

Area
  - Total: 1.29 sq mi (3.33 km^{2})

Population (2013)
  - Total: 77
  - Density: 60/sq mi (23/km^{2})
- Time zone: UTC+1 (CET)
  - Summer (DST): UTC+2 (CEST)

Podhum is a village in the municipality of Konjic, Bosnia and Herzegovina.

== Demographics ==
According to the 2013 census, its population was 77.

Ethnicity in 2013
Ethnicity	Number	Percentage
Bosniaks	73	94.8%
Croats	4	5.2%
Total	77	100%
