= Jelačići, Jablanica =

Jelačići
- Village
- Location within Bosnia and Herzegovina
- Country: Bosnia and Herzegovina
- Entity: Federation of Bosnia and Herzegovina
- Canton: Herzegovina-Neretva
- Municipality: Jablanica

Area
  - Total: 6.94 sq mi (17.98 km^{2})

Population (2013)
  - Total: 247
  - Density: 35.6/sq mi (13.7/km^{2})
- Time zone: UTC+1 (CET)
  - Summer (DST): UTC+2 (CEST)

Jelačići is a village in the municipality of Jablanica, Bosnia and Herzegovina.

== Demographics ==
According to the 2013 census, its population was 247.

Ethnicity in 2013
Ethnicity	Number	Percentage
Bosniaks	240	97.2%
Croats	6	2.4%
Serbs	1	0.4%
Total	247	100%
