= Donji Prijeslop =

Donji Prijeslop Доњи Пријеслоп
- Village
- Location within Bosnia and Herzegovina
- Coordinates: 43°46′N 17°49′E
- Country: Bosnia and Herzegovina
- Entity: Federation of Bosnia and Herzegovina
- Canton: Herzegovina-Neretva
- Municipality: Konjic

Area
  - Total: 1.69 sq mi (4.37 km^{2})

Population (2013)
  - Total: 69
  - Density: 41/sq mi (16/km^{2})
- Time zone: UTC+1 (CET)
  - Summer (DST): UTC+2 (CEST)

Donji Prijeslop (Cyrillic: Доњи Пријеслоп) is a village in the municipality of Konjic, Bosnia and Herzegovina.

== Demographics ==
According to the 2013 census, its population was 69.

Ethnicity in 2013
Ethnicity	Number	Percentage
Bosniaks	62	89.9%
Croats	7	10.1%
Total	69	100%
