= Donji Čažanj =

Donji Čažanj Доњи Чажањ
- Village
- Location within Bosnia and Herzegovina
- Coordinates: 43°48′N 17°50′E
- Country: Bosnia and Herzegovina
- Entity: Federation of Bosnia and Herzegovina
- Canton: Herzegovina-Neretva
- Municipality: Konjic

Area
  - Total: 1.09 sq mi (2.83 km^{2})

Population (2013)
  - Total: 61
  - Density: 56/sq mi (22/km^{2})
- Time zone: UTC+1 (CET)
  - Summer (DST): UTC+2 (CEST)

Donji Čažanj (Cyrillic: Доњи Чажањ) is a village in the municipality of Konjic, Bosnia and Herzegovina.

== Demographics ==
According to the 2013 census, its population was 61, all Bosniaks.
