= Jablaničko lake =

Jablaničko Lake
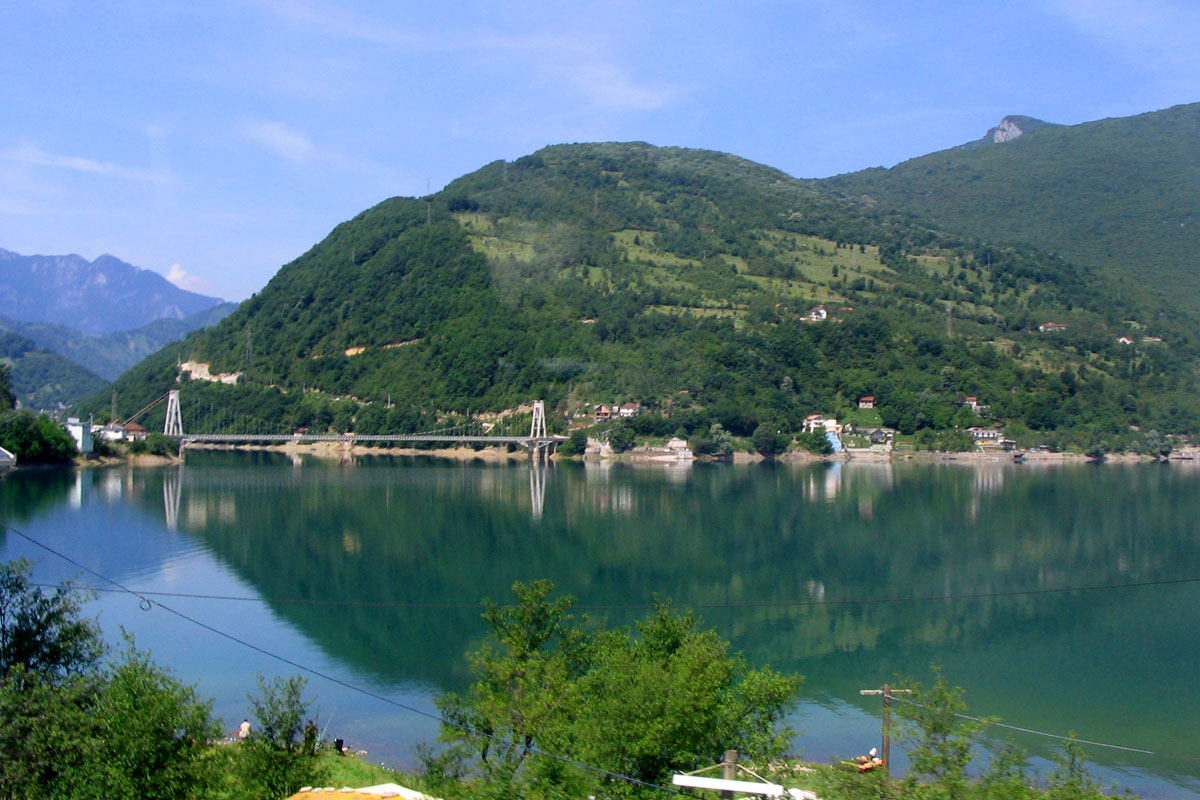

- Location within Bosnia and Herzegovina
- Interactive map of Jablaničko Lake
- Location: North Herzegovina
- Coordinates: 43°41′N 17°51′E
- Type: reservoir
- Primary inflows: Neretva
- Primary outflows: Neretva
- Basin countries: Bosnia and Herzegovina
- Max. length: 30 km (19 mi)
- Max. width: 1,200 m (3,900 ft)
- Surface area: 24 km^{2} (9.3 sq mi)
- Average depth: 70 m (230 ft)
- Max. depth: 80 m (260 ft)
- Surface elevation: 270 m (890 ft)
- Settlements: Jablanica, Konjic, Prozor-Rama

Jablaničko Lake (Serbo-Croatian: Jablaničko jezero) is a large artificially formed lake on the Neretva River, right below Konjic where the Neretva expands into a wide valley. The river provided much fertile, agricultural land there before the lake flooded most of it. The lake was created in 1953 after the construction of Jablanica Dam near Jablanica in central Bosnia and Herzegovina.

== Overview ==
The lake has an irregular elongated shape. The 30-km long lake is 1.2km across at its widest. The lake is a popular vacation destination in Bosnia and Herzegovina.

Swimming, boating, and especially fishing are popular activities on the lake. Many weekend cottages have been built along the shores of the lake.

There are 13 types of fish in the lake's ecosystem.

== Environmental issues ==
The lake suffered from poor management of water and fisheries. Without any scientific and management plans or research, local fisheries and angling management introduced, alien, non-indigenous, or non-native species, either deliberately or accidentally, which did more harm and damage than good. As the Neretva has many endemic and fragile species of fish that are near extinction, introductions of this invasive species, Pike Perch (Stizostedion lucioperca L.), completely destroyed native endemic and highly endangered fish like Strugač (Leuciscus svallize svallize Heck. et Kn.) or (Squalius svallize) and Glavatica (Salmo marmoratus) (also known as Gonjavac).

In 2024, the lake dried out during a drought.

== Gallery ==
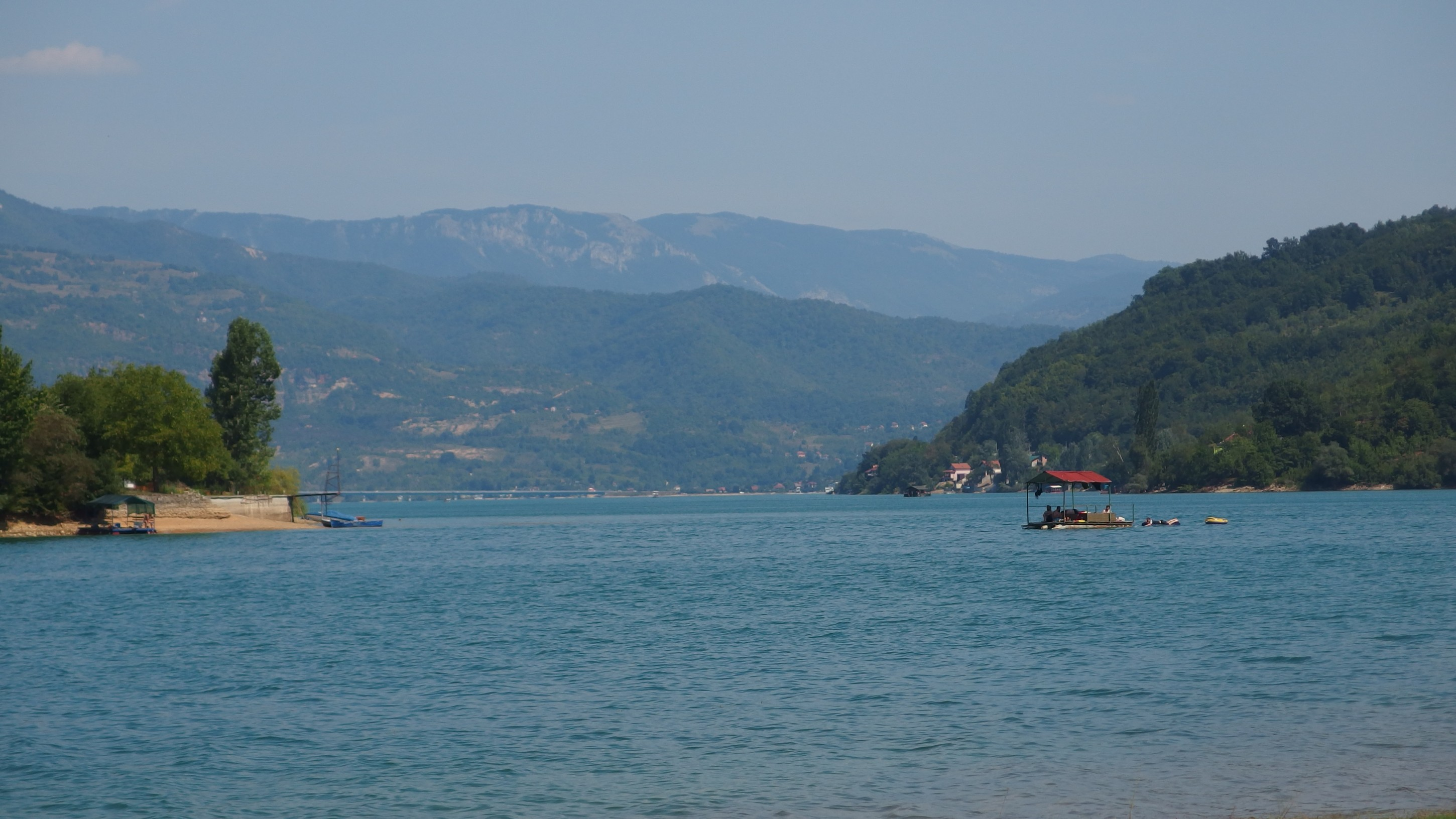
Boat at Jablaničko lake

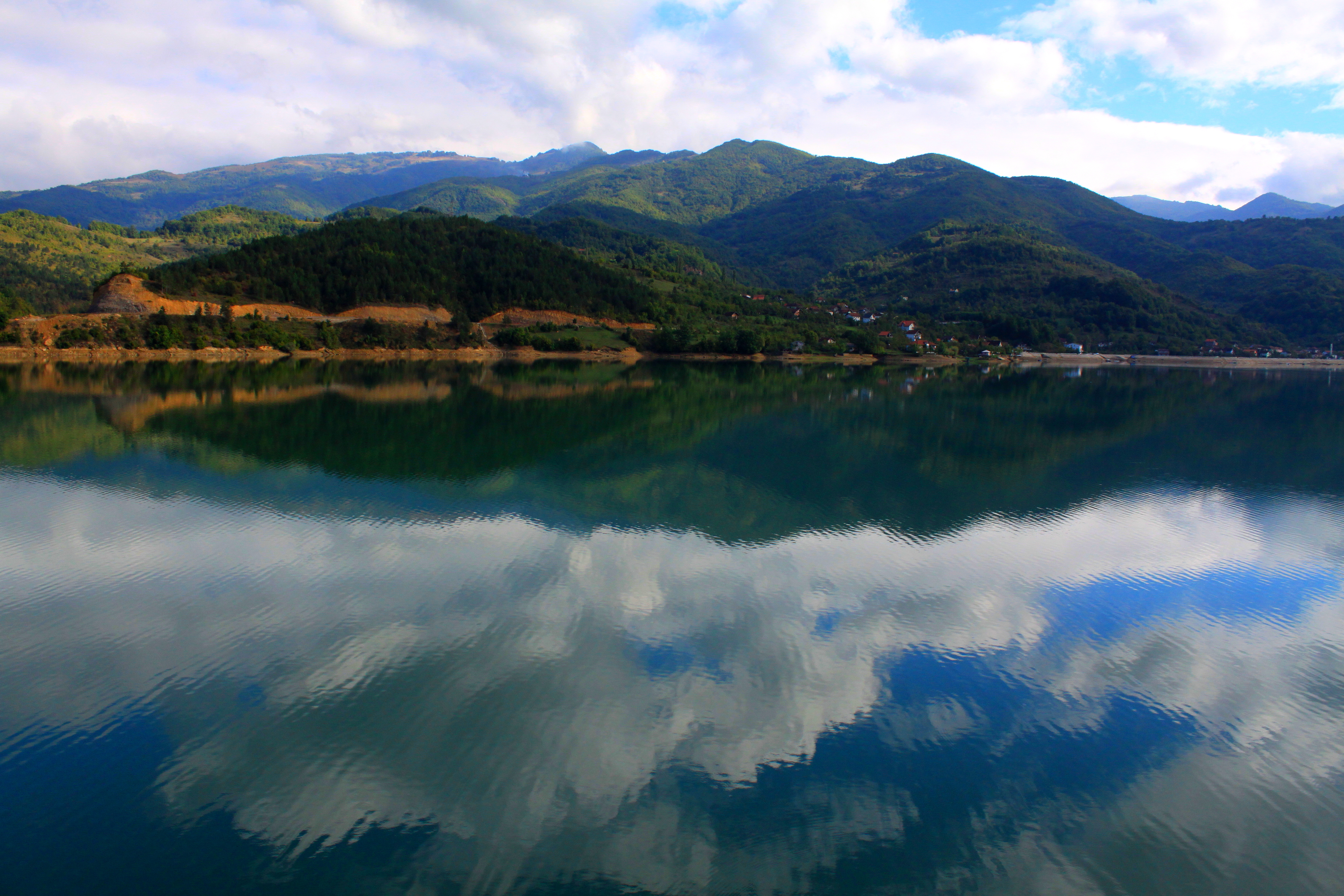
Jablanica lake at summer

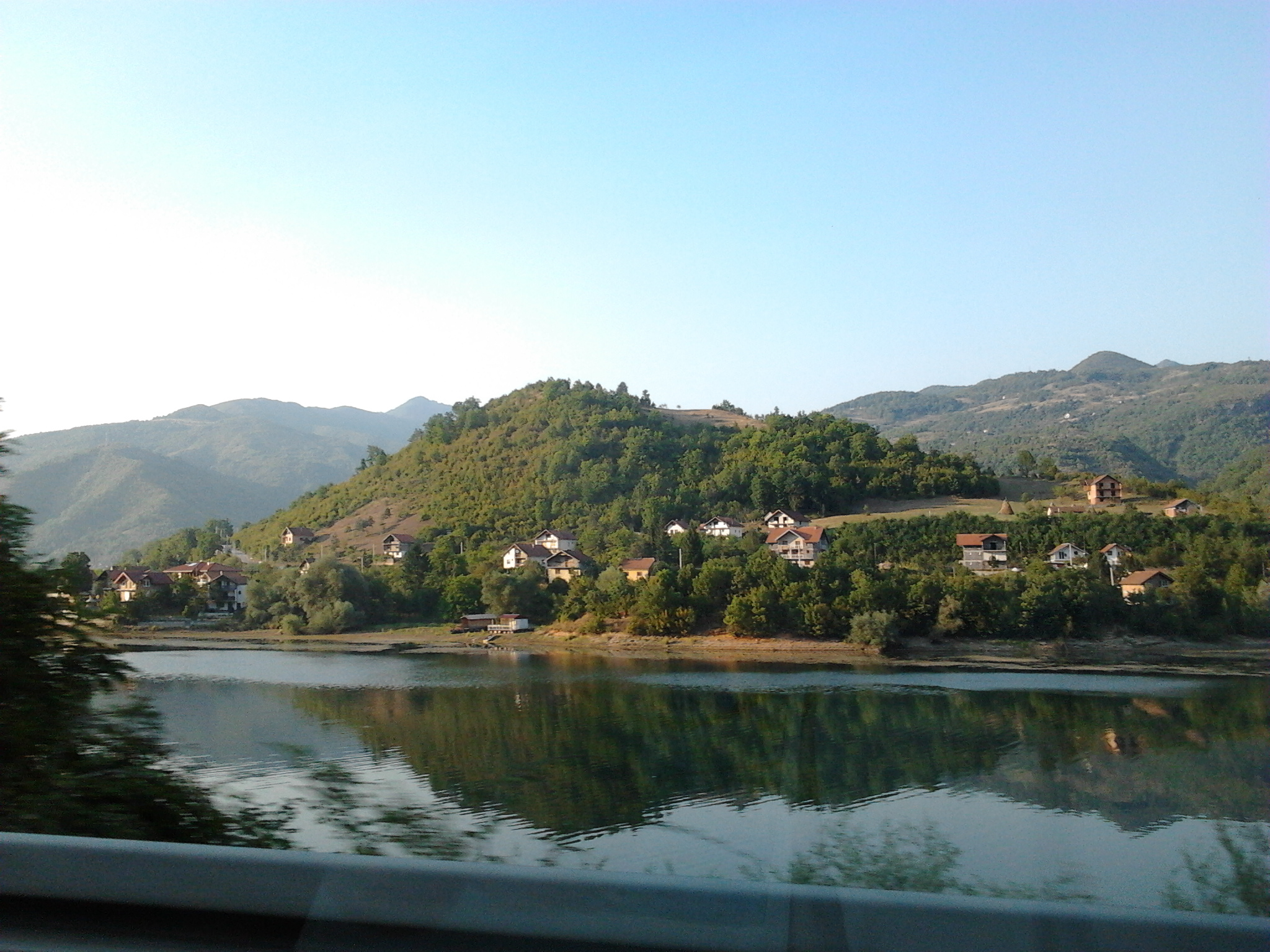
Jablanicko Jezero

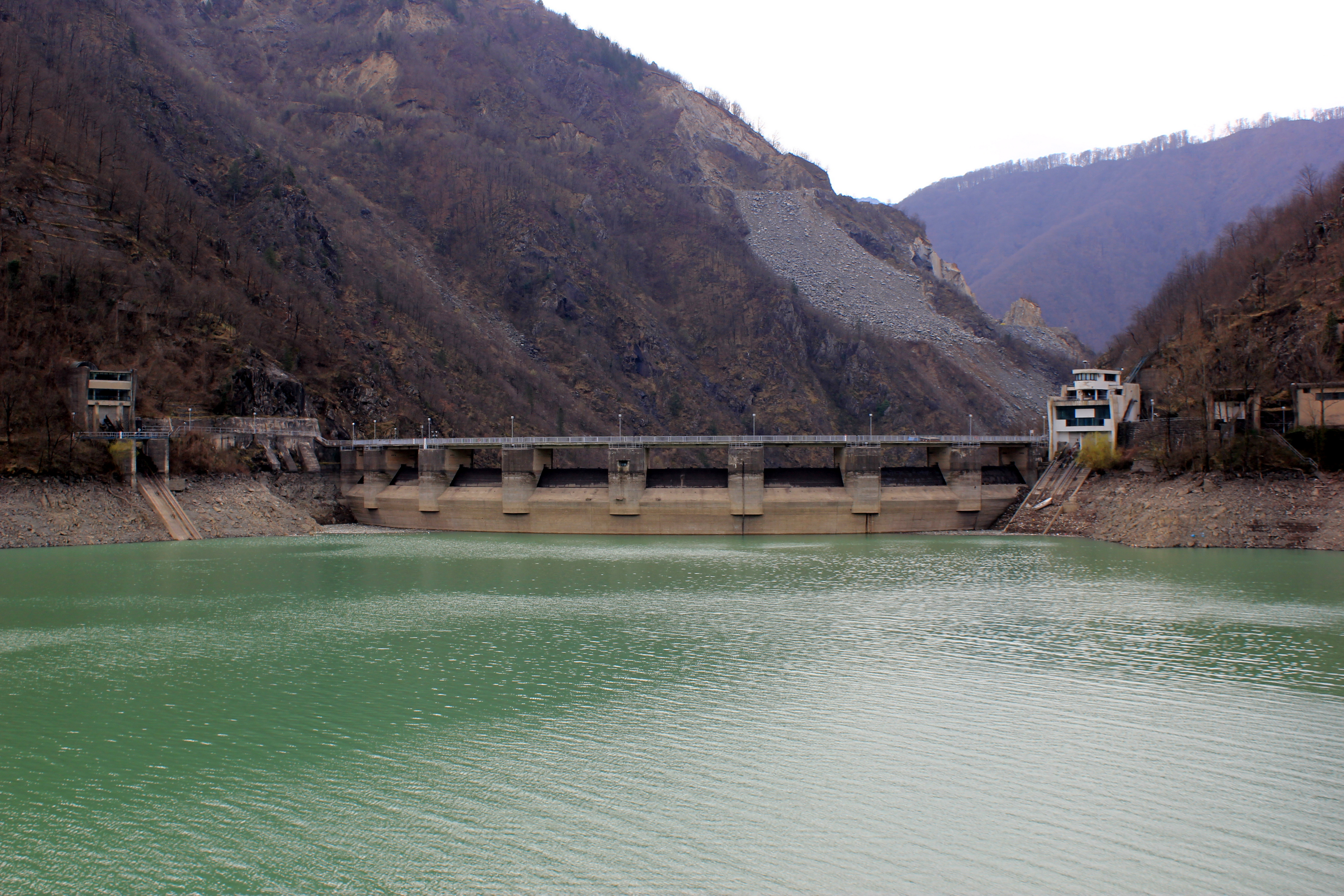
Jablanica dam

== See also ==
=== Water bodies ===
- Upper Neretva
- Rakitnica

=== Settlements ===
- Ulog
- Glavatičevo
- Lukomir
- Jablanica

=== Protected environment and treasures ===
- Blidinje
- List of birds of BiH
- List of national parks of BiH

=== Nature and culture ===
- Salmo obtusirostris
- Salmo dentex
- Salmo marmoratus
- Tourism in Bosnia and Herzegovina
