= Jablanica, Bosnia and Herzegovina =

Jablanica Јабланица
- Town and municipality
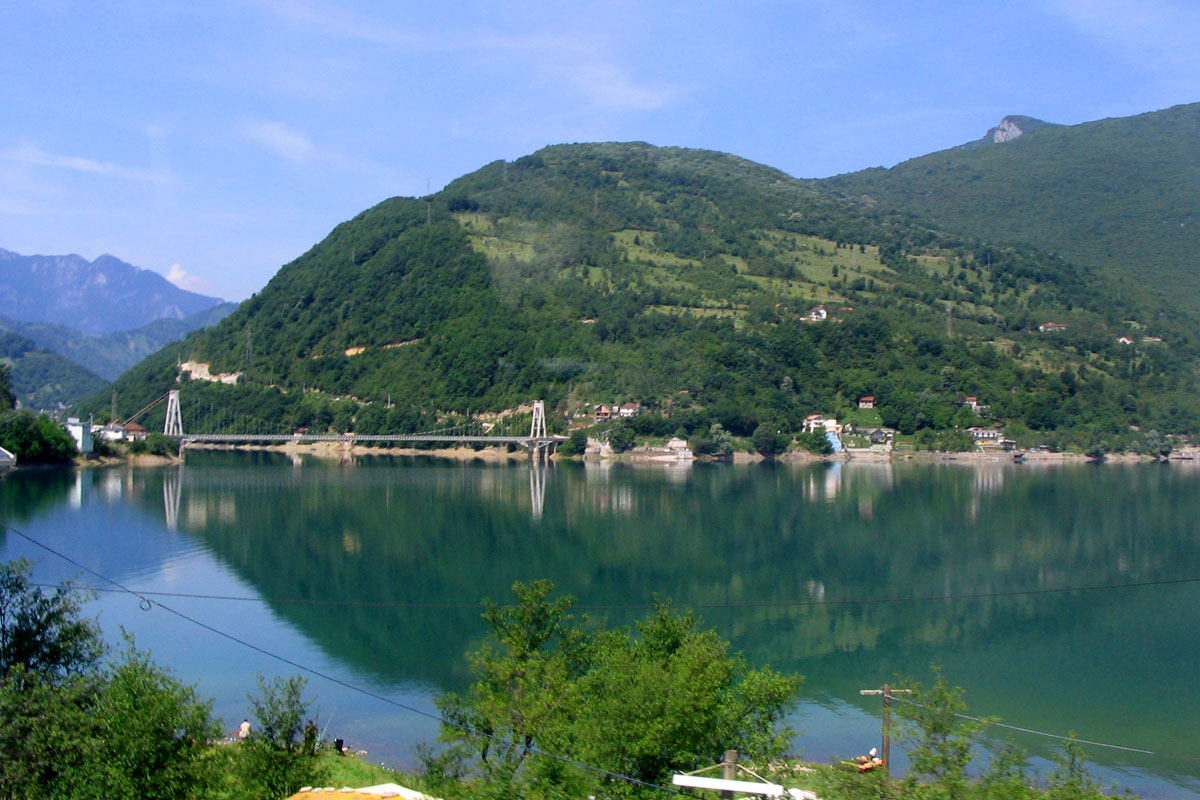
- Jablaničko lake

- Coat of arms

- Location of Jablanica within Bosnia and Herzegovina

- Location of Jablanica, Bosnia and Herzegovina
- Coordinates: 43.66204706295405°N 17.761844634919317°E
- Country: Bosnia and Herzegovina
- Entity: Federation of Bosnia and Herzegovina
- Canton: Herzegovina-Neretva
- Geographical region: Herzegovina

Government
  - Municipal mayor: Emir Muratović (SDA)

Area
  - Town and municipality: 301 km^{2} (116 sq mi)

Population (2013 census)
  - Town and municipality: 10,111
  - Density: 35/km^{2} (91/sq mi)
  - Urban: 4,057
- Time zone: UTC+1 (CET)
  - Summer (DST): UTC+2 (CEST)
- Area code: +387 36
- Website: www.jablanica.ba

Jablanica (Serbian Cyrillic: Јабланица) is a town and municipality located in the Herzegovina-Neretva Canton of the Federation of Bosnia and Herzegovina, an entity of Bosnia and Herzegovina. It is situated on the Neretva river and Jablanica lake.

== Municipality ==
The municipality of Jablanica is a major tourist destination in Bosnia and Herzegovina. The municipality offers a wide variety of activities. The surrounding mountains such as Plasa, Čvrsnica and Prenj offer both hunting grounds and a variety of hiking trails. One popular hiking destination is "Hajdučka Vrata", a natural wonder, the product of wind erosion, located 2,000 meters above sea level on the mountain of Čvrsnica.

Risovac is a settlement in the municipality, located on a plateau outside of the city, it has several attractions. It is the site of two necropolises, both locations filled with medieval tombstones known as Stećci. Stećci necropolises are characteristic and most prevalent in Bosnia and Herzegovina. Risovac has a ski center attracting winter tourists.

The Jablanica Lake (Jablaničko Jezero) is an important resource. The lake borders many of its settlements and is used for several purposes. The lake is used to generate electricity while it also serves as a top summer destination for fishing, swimming, water sports and other activities. Notable settlements include Ostrožac, which hosts the start of the annual rowing marathon and Donje Paprasko, the location of a public beach and the host of the marathon finish line.

== Geography ==
The mean elevation of Jablanica is 202 metres (663 ft) above sea level. Some 69% of the municipality's land area (approx. 93 km²) is forested. Jablanica's lake ("Jablaničko") is an important geographical as well as an economic presence in Jablanica.

== Settlements ==
- Baćina
- Bijela, Jablanica
- Čehari
- Čivelj
- Djevor
- Dobrigošće
- Dobrinja, Jablanica
- Doljani
- Donja Jablanica
- Donje Paprasko
- Dragan Selo
- Glodnica, Jablanica
- Glogošnica
- Gornje Paprasko
- Jelačići, Jablanica
- Kosne Luke
- Krstac, Jablanica
- Lendava, Jablanica
- Lug, Jablanica
- Mirke, Jablanica
- Mrakovo, Jablanica
- Ostrožac, Jablanica
- Poda, Jablanica
- Ravna, Jablanica
- Risovac, Jablanica
- Rodići
- Slatina, Jablanica
- Sovići, Jablanica
- Šabančići
- Šanica
- Zlate, Jablanica
- Žuglići

== Demographics ==
=== 2013 ===
10,111 total

- 9,045 Bosniaks (89.46%)
- 726 Croats (7.18%)
- 63 Serbs (0.62%)
- 277 others (2.74%)

== Governance ==
The main local government of the municipality is the Municipal Council of Jablanica (Bosnian: Općinska skupština; Croatian: Općinsko vijeće; Serbian: Opštinska skupština). Council has 19 members elected for a four-year term by proportional representation. Jablanica also has its municipal mayor who is the highest-ranking official in the municipal government.

=== Structure of the Council ===
Party	2020–
Party of Democratic Action (SDA)	6
Social Democratic Party (SDP)	4
Union for a Better Future of BiH (SBB)	1
Independent Adisa Zukić	1
Independent Nihad Širić	1
Independent Amira Mursel-Čilić	1
Liberal Democratic Party (LDS) (2020–2022)/Our Party (NS) (2022–)	1
Independent Idriz Čilić	1
Democratic Front (DF)	1
Independent Džemal Macić	1
Croatian Democratic Union (HDZ)	1

== History ==
During the Battle of the Neretva (also known as the Battle for the Wounded) in 1943, Jablanica was the site of a successful raid by a group of Partisans led by Josip Broz Tito. A rail bridge over the river was blown up while a train was in the middle of crossing. A museum and park in Jablanica commemorate the action at the site.

The municipality was hit by severe floods in October 2024, which resulted in the deaths of 19 people.

== Notable people ==
- Dženan Ćatić, footballer
- Vahid Halilhodžić, footballer and manager who represented the Yugoslavia national team
- Senad Lulić, footballer who represented the Bosnia and Herzegovina national team
- Hasan Salihamidžić, footballer who represented the Bosnia and Herzegovina national team and sports executive
- Jasmin Šćuk, footballer
- Mirza Teletović, basketball player

== Twin towns – sister cities ==
Jablanica is twinned with:

- Başiskele, Turkey
- Gevgelija, North Macedonia
- Inđija, Serbia
- Paraćin, Serbia
