= List of settlements in the Federation of Bosnia and Herzegovina/B =

List of settlements in the Federation of Bosnia and Herzegovina - B
Settlement	City or municipality	Canton
Babića Brdo	Glamoč	Canton 10
Babin Do	Neum	Herzegovina-Neretva Canton
Babin Potok	Donji Vakuf	Central Bosnia Canton
Babino Selo	Donji Vakuf	Central Bosnia Canton
Bačci	Goražde	Bosnian-Podrinje Canton Goražde
Bačevići	Mostar	Herzegovina-Neretva Canton
Bačvice	Travnik	Central Bosnia Canton
Baćina	Jablanica	
Badnje	Kiseljak	Central Bosnia Canton
Bahovo	Goražde	Bosnian-Podrinje Canton Goražde
Bajovci	Čapljina	Herzegovina-Neretva Canton
Bakije	Goražde	Bosnian-Podrinje Canton Goražde
Bakovići	Fojnica	Central Bosnia Canton
Bakovićka Citonja	Fojnica	Central Bosnia Canton
Bale	Konjic	Herzegovina-Neretva Canton
Balići	Novi Travnik	Central Bosnia Canton
Baljci	Tomislavgrad	Canton 10
Baljivac	Ravno	Herzegovina-Neretva Canton
Bandol	Travnik	Central Bosnia Canton
Banja	Fojnica	Central Bosnia Canton
Banjdol	Mostar	Herzegovina-Neretva Canton
Baonine	Ravno	Herzegovina-Neretva Canton
Barane		
Barbarići	Bugojno	Central Bosnia Canton
Bare	Busovača	Central Bosnia Canton
Bare	Goražde	Bosnian-Podrinje Canton Goražde
Bare	Jajce	Central Bosnia Canton
Bare	Konjic	Herzegovina-Neretva Canton
Bare	Posušje	West Herzegovina Canton
Barevo (part)	Jajce	Central Bosnia Canton
Barice	Donji Vakuf	Central Bosnia Canton
Barjamovci	Kupres	Canton 10
Barmiš	Konjic	Herzegovina-Neretva Canton
Bastasi	Drvar	Canton 10
Bastasi	Bosansko Grahovo	Canton 10
Bašabulići	Novo Goražde	
Bašići	Bugojno	Central Bosnia Canton
Batin		West Herzegovina Canton
Batkovići	Goražde	Bosnian-Podrinje Canton Goražde
Batuša	Uskoplje	Central Bosnia Canton
Bavar	Jajce	Central Bosnia Canton
Bavčići	Foča	
Begovo Selo	Kupres	Canton 10
Behrići	Kiseljak	Central Bosnia Canton
Belenići	Ravno	Herzegovina-Neretva Canton
Bešlići	Foča	
Bevrnjići	Bugojno	Central Bosnia Canton
Bezmilje	Goražde	Bosnian-Podrinje Canton Goražde
Bihać	Bihać	Una-Sana Canton
Bijača	Ljubuški	West Herzegovina Canton
Bijakovići	Čitluk	Herzegovina-Neretva Canton
Bijela	Jablanica	Herzegovina-Neretva Canton
Bijela	Konjic	Herzegovina-Neretva Canton
Bijelo Bučje	Travnik	Central Bosnia Canton
Bila	Livno	Canton 10
Bila	Vitez	Central Bosnia Canton
Bilalovac	Kiseljak	Central Bosnia Canton
Biletići	Čitluk	Herzegovina-Neretva Canton
Biličić	Glamoč	Canton 10
Bilići	Travnik	Central Bosnia Canton
Bilo Polje	Livno	Canton 10
Bili Potok	Kupres	Canton 10
Biljin	Goražde	Bosnian-Podrinje Canton Goražde
Biograci	Široki Brijeg	West Herzegovina Canton
Biokovine	Jajce	Central Bosnia Canton
Bistrica	Jajce	Central Bosnia Canton
Bistrica	Fojnica	Central Bosnia Canton
Bistrica	Uskoplje	Central Bosnia Canton
Bistro	Novi Travnik	Central Bosnia Canton
Bivolje Brdo	Čapljina	Herzegovina-Neretva Canton
Bjelojevići		
Bjelovići	Kreševo	Central Bosnia Canton
Bjelovčina	Konjic	Herzegovina-Neretva Canton
Blace	Konjic	Herzegovina-Neretva Canton
Blace	Prozor-Rama	Herzegovina-Neretva Canton
Blagaj	Donji Vakuf	Central Bosnia Canton
Blagaj	Kupres	Canton 10
Blagaj	Mostar	Herzegovina-Neretva Canton
Blagojevići	Novo Goražde	
Blaževići	Grude	West Herzegovina Canton
Blažuj	Tomislavgrad	Canton 10
Blizanci	Čitluk	Herzegovina-Neretva Canton
Bliznice	Kiseljak	Central Bosnia Canton
Blučići	Konjic	Herzegovina-Neretva Canton
Boboljusci	Drvar	Canton 10
Bobovišta	Ravno	Herzegovina-Neretva Canton
Bode	Bugojno	Central Bosnia Canton
Bogdanići	Novo Goražde	
Bogdaše	Livno	Canton 10
Bogdašić	Tomislavgrad	Canton 10
Bogušići	Goražde	Herzegovina-Neretva Canton
Bogodol	Mostar	Herzegovina-Neretva Canton
Bojmunte	Livno	Canton 10
Bojska	Uskoplje	Central Bosnia Canton
Boljkovac	Uskoplje	Central Bosnia Canton
Boljkovići	Kiseljak	Central Bosnia Canton
Borajna	Grude	West Herzegovina Canton
Borak Brdo	Novo Goražde	
Borci	Konjic	Herzegovina-Neretva Canton
Borina	Kiseljak	Central Bosnia Canton
Borčani	Tomislavgrad	Canton 10
Borojevići		
Borova Ravan	Uskoplje	Central Bosnia Canton
Borovići	Goražde	Bosnian-Podrinje Canton Goražde
Borovnica	Prozor-Rama	Herzegovina-Neretva Canton
Borut	Neum	Herzegovina-Neretva Canton
Bosanska Krupa	Bosanska Krupa	Una-Sana Canton
Bosanski Osredci	Drvar	Canton 10
Bosanski Petrovac	Bosanski Petrovac	Una-Sana Canton
Bosansko Grahovo	Bosansko Grahovo	Canton 10
Bosanje	Novo Goražde	
Boškovići	Goražde	Bosnian-Podrinje Canton Goražde
Botun	Fojnica	Central Bosnia Canton
Botun	Kupres	Canton 10
Botunja	Kreševo	Central Bosnia Canton
Boždarevići	Konjic	Herzegovina-Neretva Canton
Božići	Fojnica	Central Bosnia Canton
Božići	Novi Travnik	Central Bosnia Canton
Božikovac	Jajce	Central Bosnia Canton
Bradina	Konjic	Herzegovina-Neretva Canton
Brajkovići	Travnik	Central Bosnia Canton
Brajići	Travnik	Central Bosnia Canton
Brajlovići	Goražde	Bosnian-Podrinje Canton Goražde
Brankovac	Travnik	Central Bosnia Canton
Bratiš	Goražde	Bosnian-Podrinje Canton Goražde
Bravnice	Jajce	Central Bosnia Canton
Brda	Bugojno	Central Bosnia Canton
Brda	Donji Vakuf	Central Bosnia Canton
Brda	Drvar	Canton 10
Brda	Kupres	Canton 10
Brdo	Donji Vakuf	Central Bosnia Canton
Brdo	Vitez	Central Bosnia Canton
Brđani	Konjic	Herzegovina-Neretva Canton
Brekovi	Goražde	Bosnian-Podrinje Canton Goražde
Brestica	Neum	Herzegovina-Neretva Canton
Brezičani	Donji Vakuf	Central Bosnia Canton
Brezje	Goražde	Bosnian-Podrinje Canton Goražde
Brijeg	Goražde	Bosnian-Podrinje Canton Goražde
Bristovi	Bugojno	Central Bosnia Canton
Brizje	Kiseljak	Central Bosnia Canton
Brižina	Bugojno	Central Bosnia Canton
Brnjaci	Kiseljak	Central Bosnia Canton
Brnjići	Dobretići	Central Bosnia Canton
Broćanac	Neum	Herzegovina-Neretva Canton
Broćanac	Posušje	West Herzegovina Canton
Brštanica	Neum	Herzegovina-Neretva Canton
Brvanci	Jajce	Central Bosnia Canton
Bučići	Jajce	Central Bosnia Canton
Bučići	Novi Travnik	Central Bosnia Canton
Bučje	Goražde	Bosnian-Podrinje Canton Goražde
Bućevača	Kupres	Canton 10
Budići	Goražde	Bosnian-Podrinje Canton Goražde
Budišnja Ravan	Konjic	Herzegovina-Neretva Canton
Budušići	Novi Travnik	Central Bosnia Canton
Bugojčići	Novi Travnik	Central Bosnia Canton
Bugojno	Bugojno	Central Bosnia Canton
Buhovo	Široki Brijeg	West Herzegovina Canton
Bukova Gora	Tomislavgrad	Canton 10
Bukovci	Busovača	Central Bosnia Canton
Bukovica	Kiseljak	Central Bosnia Canton
Bukovica	Konjic	Herzegovina-Neretva Canton
Bukovica	Tomislavgrad	Canton 10
Bukovlje	Konjic	Herzegovina-Neretva Canton
Bukva	Kreševo	Central Bosnia Canton
Bukve	Vitez	Central Bosnia Canton
Bukvići	Novi Travnik	Central Bosnia Canton
Bulatovići	Konjic	Herzegovina-Neretva Canton
Bulići	Jajce	Central Bosnia Canton
Buna	Mostar	Herzegovina-Neretva Canton
Bunar	Dobretići	Central Bosnia Canton
Bunčevac	Drvar	Canton 10
Bunčići	Foča	
Burmazi (part)		
Buselji	Busovača	Central Bosnia Canton
Busovača	Busovača	Central Bosnia Canton
Bušćak	Konjic	Herzegovina-Neretva Canton
Butkovići	Goražde	Bosnian-Podrinje Canton Goražde
Butkovići Ilovača	Goražde	Bosnian-Podrinje Canton Goražde
Buturović Polje	Konjic	Herzegovina-Neretva Canton
Buzuci	Kiseljak	Central Bosnia Canton
