= List of settlements in the Federation of Bosnia and Herzegovina/K =

== Ka ==
Kakanj, Kalac, Kale, Kalesija, Kalađurđevići (municipality Ravno), Kamen, Kanlići, Kanjina, Karauzovići, Karovići, Kašići, Kazagići

== Ki ==
Kijev Do (municipality Ravno)

== Kl ==
Klepci

== Knj ==
Knjevići

== Ko ==
Kodžaga Polje, Kola, Kolakovići, Kolijevke, Kolovarice, Komanje Brdo (municipality Stolac(BiH)), Konjbaba, Konjevići, Konjic (Herzegovina-Neretva Canton), Kosne Luke, Kopači, Kosače, Kostajnica, Kostenik, Koto, Kovači, Kozice (municipality Stolac(BiH))

== Kr ==
Kraboriš, Krajkovići, Kralupi, Krašići, Kreča, Krehin Gradac, Krstac, Krtići, Krućevići, Krupac, Krušćica, Kruševo (municipality Stolac)

== Ku ==
Kučine, Kula, Kušeši, Kutina (municipality Ravno), Kutješi
