= List of settlements in the Federation of Bosnia and Herzegovina/P =

== Pa ==
Pačerani, Pajići (municipality Prozor-Rama), Paljike (municipality Prozor-Rama), Paoča, Paraun, Parcani (municipality Prozor-Rama), Paroš (municipality Prozor-Rama), Parsovići

== Pe ==
Perjani,

== Pi ==
Pijesci (municipality Mostar), Pijestina, Pijevac

== Pj ==
Pješivac-Greda (municipality Stolac(BiH)), Pješivac-Kula (municipality Stolac(BiH))

== Pl ==
Plavuzi, Plesi, Ploča (municipality Prozor-Rama)

== Po ==
Počitelj, Poda, Podbor (municipality Prozor-Rama), Podgorani (municipality Mostar), Podgorje (municipality Mostar), Podgrađe, Podhomara, Podhranjen, Podhum, Podkozara Donja, Podkozara Gornja, Podmeljine, Podorašac, Podosoje (municipality Ravno), Podvelež (municipality Mostar), Pokojište, Polje Bijela, Polog (municipality Mostar), Poplat (municipality Stolac(BiH)) (part), Poprati (municipality Stolac), Poratak, Potoci (municipality Mostar), Potpolje, Potrkuša, Požetva

== Pr ==
Prapratnica (municipality Neum), Prćavci, Prebilovci, Prenj (municipality Stolac), Previla, Previš (municipality Neum), Prevlje, Pribjenovići, Prigrađani (municipality Mostar), Prisoje (dio), Prisoje, Prolaz, Prosjek (municipality Ravno), Proslap (municipality Prozor-Rama), Prozor (grad), Pršeši
