= List of settlements in the Federation of Bosnia and Herzegovina/M =

== Ma ==
Maglice (municipality Prozor-Rama), Mali Ograđenik, Malo Polje (municipality Mostar), Markovići, Mašići, Mazlina

== Me ==
Međugorje, Meopotočje (municipality Prozor-Rama)

== Mi ==
Milanovići, Miljkovići (municipality Mostar), Mirke, Mirvići, Mirvići na Podhranjenu

== Ml ==
Mladeškovići, Mluša (municipality Prozor-Rama)

== Mo ==
Mokro, Morinac, Mostar (Herzegovina-Neretva Canton), Moševići (municipality Neum)

== Mr ==
Mrakovo, Mravi, Mravinjac, Mravljača, Mrkosovice, Mrkovi
