= List of settlements in the Federation of Bosnia and Herzegovina/V =

== Va ==
Vašarovići

== Ve ==
Vedro Polje, Velika Kladuša, Veliki Ograđenik, Veluša, Velja Međa (municipality Ravno), Veljaci, Vesela

== Vi ==
Vihovići (municipality Mostar), Vileši, Vinište, Vinjani, Vionica, Vir, Visoko, Vitez, Vitina, Vitkovići, Višići

== Vl ==
Vinine (municipality Neum) Vlahovići, Vlajčići, Vlaka (municipality Ravno)

== Vo ==
Vojnići, Vojno (municipality Mostar)

== Vr ==
Vraneši, Vranići, Vranpotok, Vranjevići (municipality Mostar), Vrapčići (municipality Mostar), Vrbanja, Vrbica, Vrbljani, Vrci, Vrdi (municipality Mostar), Vrdolje, Vremci, Vrpeć, Vrpolje

== Vu ==
Vučetići, Vučipolje, Vučipolje, Vukovići (municipality Ravno)
