= List of settlements in the Federation of Bosnia and Herzegovina/U =

== Ud ==
Udurlije

== Ug ==
Ugošće

== Uh ==
Uhotići

== Us ==
Uskoplje (municipality Ravno), Ustikolina, Ustiprača

== Uš ==
Ušanovići

== Ut ==
Utješinovići

== Uz ==
Uzarići (Široki Brijeg)
