= List of settlements in the Federation of Bosnia and Herzegovina/O =

== Ob ==
Obrenovac, Obri

== Odž ==
Odžaci, Odžak

== Op ==
Opličići

== Or ==
Orah (municipality Ravno), Orahov Do (municipality Ravno), Orahovica, Orahovice, Orašje Popovo (municipality Ravno) (part) Orlište, Oručevac

== Os ==
Osanica, Osječani, Ostrožac, Ostružno

== Oš ==
Ošanjići (municipality Stolac(BiH))

== Ot ==
Oteležani

== Ov ==
Ovčari

== Oz ==
Ozrenovići
