= Ahmovići =

- Village
- Location within Bosnia and Herzegovina
- Coordinates: 43°38′N 18°57′E
- Country: Bosnia and Herzegovina
- Entity: Federation of Bosnia and Herzegovina
- Canton: Bosnian-Podrinje Goražde
- Municipality: Goražde

Area
  - Total: 0.68 sq mi (1.75 km^{2})
- Elevation: 1,150 ft (350 m)

Population (2013)
  - Total: 18
  - Density: 27/sq mi (10/km^{2})
- Time zone: UTC+1 (CET)
  - Summer (DST): UTC+2 (CEST)

Ahmovići is a village in the municipality of Goražde, Bosnia and Herzegovina.

== Demographics ==
According to the 2013 census, its population was 18.

Ethnicity in 2013
Ethnicity	Number	Percentage
Bosniaks	12	66.7%
other/undeclared	6	33.3%
Total	18	100%
