= Zabus =

- Village
- Location within Bosnia and Herzegovina
- Coordinates: 43°38′N 18°49′E
- Country: Bosnia and Herzegovina
- Entity: Federation of Bosnia and Herzegovina
- Canton: Bosnian-Podrinje Goražde
- Municipality: Goražde

Area
  - Total: 0.78 sq mi (2.03 km^{2})

Population (2013)
  - Total: 35
  - Density: 45/sq mi (17/km^{2})
- Time zone: UTC+1 (CET)
  - Summer (DST): UTC+2 (CEST)

Zabus is a village in the municipality of Goražde, Bosnia and Herzegovina.

== Demographics ==
According to the 2013 census, its population was 35.

Ethnicity in 2013
| Ethnicity | Number | Percentage |
|---|---|---|
| Bosniaks | 34 | 97.1% |
| other/undeclared | 1 | 2.9% |
| Total | 35 | 100% |
