= Zupčići =

- Village
- Location within Bosnia and Herzegovina
- Coordinates: 43°38′30″N 18°58′21″E
- Country: Bosnia and Herzegovina
- Entity: Federation of Bosnia and Herzegovina
- Canton: Bosnian-Podrinje Goražde
- Municipality: Goražde

Area
  - Total: 1.12 sq mi (2.90 km^{2})
- Elevation: 1,158 ft (353 m)

Population (2013)
  - Total: 382
  - Density: 341/sq mi (132/km^{2})
- Time zone: UTC+1 (CET)
  - Summer (DST): UTC+2 (CEST)

Zupčići is a suburb in the city of Goražde, Bosnia and Herzegovina.

== Demographics ==
According to the 2013 census, its population was 382.

Ethnicity in 2013
| Ethnicity | Number | Percentage |
|---|---|---|
| Bosniaks | 331 | 86.6% |
| Serbs | 46 | 12.0% |
| Croats | 1 | 0.3% |
| other/undeclared | 4 | 1.0% |
| Total | 382 | 100% |
