= Kučine, Bosnia and Herzegovina =

Kučine
- Village
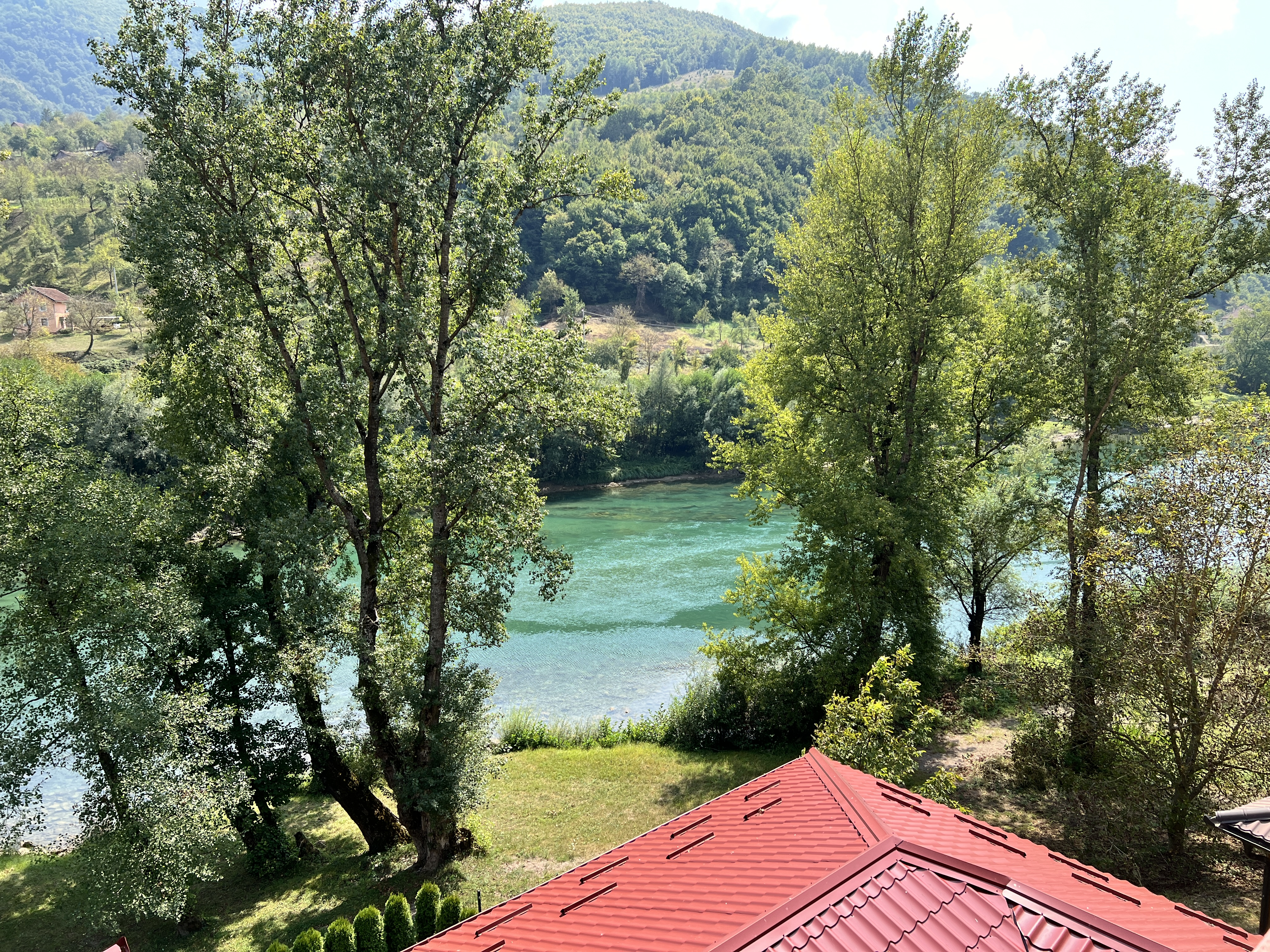
- Drina River in Kučine

- Location within Bosnia and Herzegovina
- Country: Bosnia and Herzegovina
- Entity: Federation of Bosnia and Herzegovina
- Canton: Bosnian-Podrinje Goražde
- Municipality: Goražde

Area
  - Total: 0.67 sq mi (1.74 km^{2})

Population (2013)
  - Total: 86
  - Density: 130/sq mi (49/km^{2})
- Time zone: UTC+1 (CET)
  - Summer (DST): UTC+2 (CEST)

Kučine is a village in the municipality of Goražde, Bosnia and Herzegovina.

== Demographics ==
According to the 2013 census, its population was 86.

Ethnicity in 2013
| Ethnicity | Number | Percentage |
|---|---|---|
| Bosniaks | 81 | 94.2% |
| other/undeclared | 5 | 5.8% |
| Total | 86 | 100% |

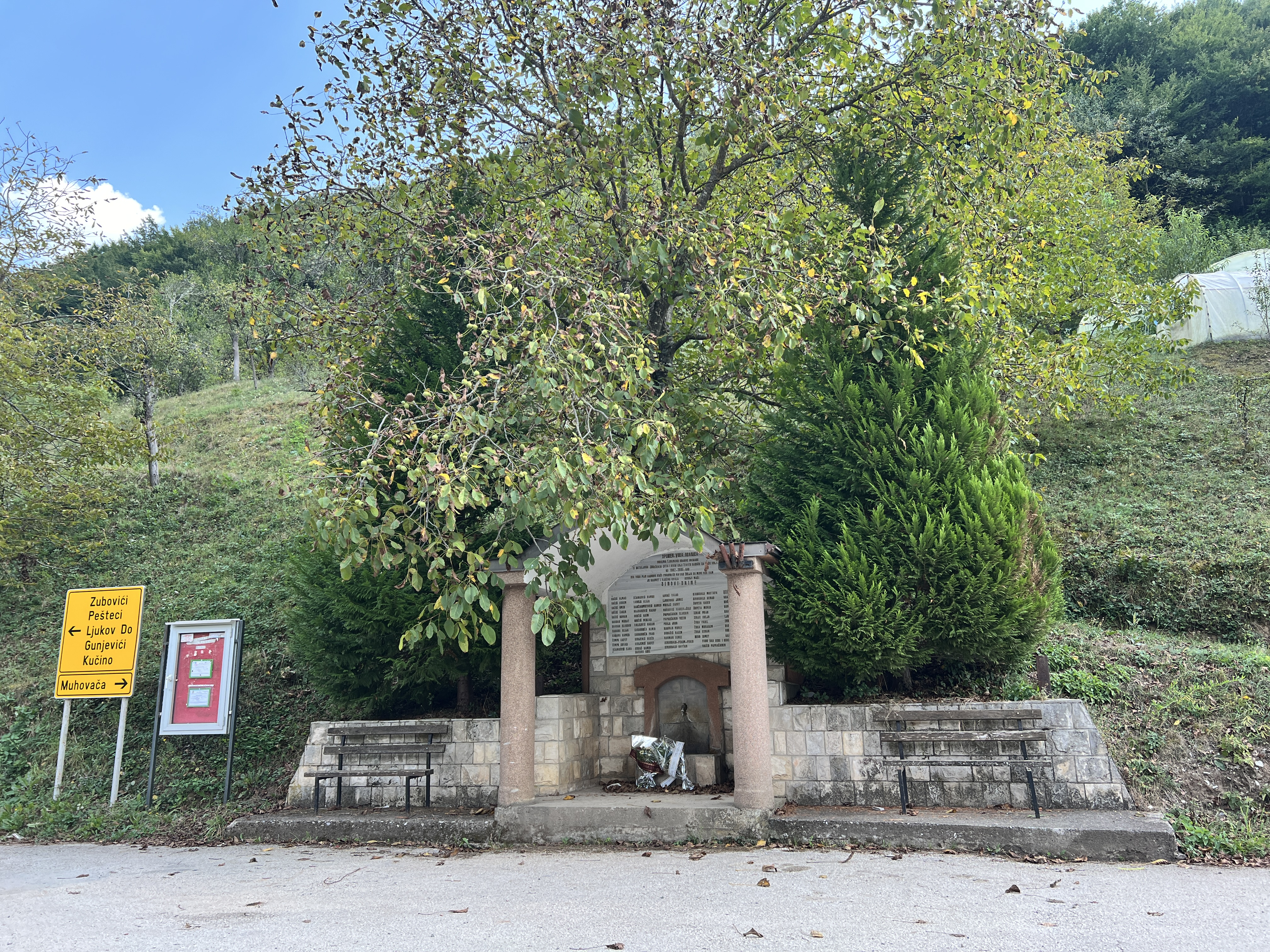
A Bosnian War memorial in Kučine
