= Goražde =

Goražde Горажде
- City
- Grad Goražde; Град Горажде; Town of Goražde
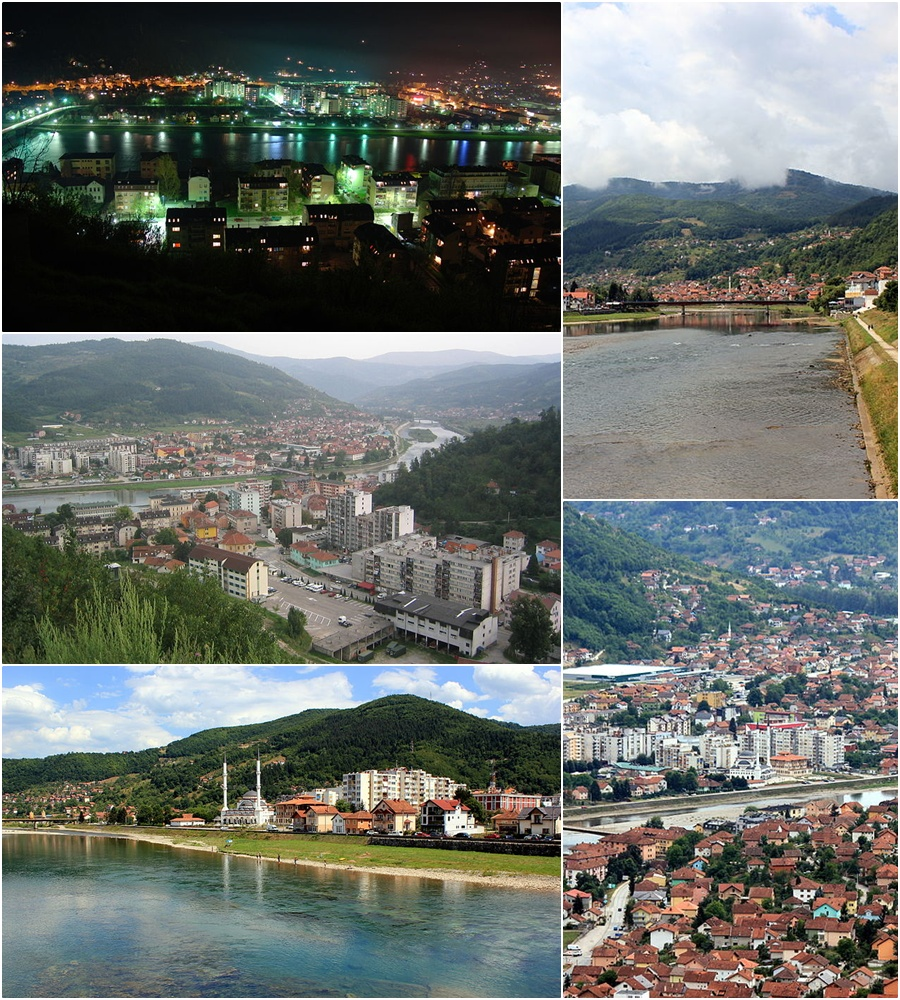
- Goražde

- Seal

- Location of Goražde within Bosnia and Herzegovina
- Coordinates: 43°40′07″N 18°58′32″E
- Country: Bosnia and Herzegovina
- Entity: Federation of Bosnia and Herzegovina
- Canton: Bosnian-Podrinje Canton
- Geographical region: Podrinje

Government
  - Mayor: Ernest Imamović (SDP BiH)

Area
  - City: 248.8 km^{2} (96.1 sq mi)
  - Urban: 23.8 km^{2} (9.2 sq mi)
- Elevation: 345 m (1,132 ft)

Population (2013 census)
  - City: 20,897
  - Urban: 11,806 (4 local communities 13,970)
  - Urban density: 1,944.97/km^{2} (5,037.4/sq mi)
- Time zone: UTC+1 (CET)
  - Summer (DST): UTC+2 (CEST)
- Postal code: 73000
- Area code: +387 38
- Website: www.gorazde.ba

Goražde (Serbian Cyrillic: Горажде, pronounced [ɡǒraʒde]) is a town and the administrative centre of the Bosnian-Podrinje Canton Goražde of the Federation of Bosnia and Herzegovina, an entity of Bosnia and Herzegovina. It is situated on the banks of the Drina river. As of 2013, the town has a population of 20,897 inhabitants, while the urban centre has 11,806 inhabitants.

== Location ==
Goražde is situated on the banks of the River Drina in southeastern Bosnia. The city lies at the foot of the eastern slope of the Jahorina mountain at a height of 345 m (1,132 ft) above sea level. The settlement is situated on the alluvial terrace in a broad valley, formed by the erosion of the River Drina. The valley borders Biserna to the southeast (701 m (2,300 ft)), Samari to the south (696 m (2,283 ft)), Misjak to the southwest (618 m (2,028 ft)), Gubavica to the west (410 m (1,345 ft)) and Povrsnica to the north (420 m (1,378 ft)).

The River Drina flows between these and some other hills. Its valley, which, since ancient times has been part of the route going from the sea to the mainland (Dubrovnik–Trebinje–Gacko–Foča–the Drina valley), is the main traffic artery in the southeastern region of Bosnia. In Goražde this route meets another route coming from Sarajevo and central Bosnia via the Jabuka Mountain, passes down to the Drina valley and proceeds on to Plevlje.

== History ==
=== Medieval period ===
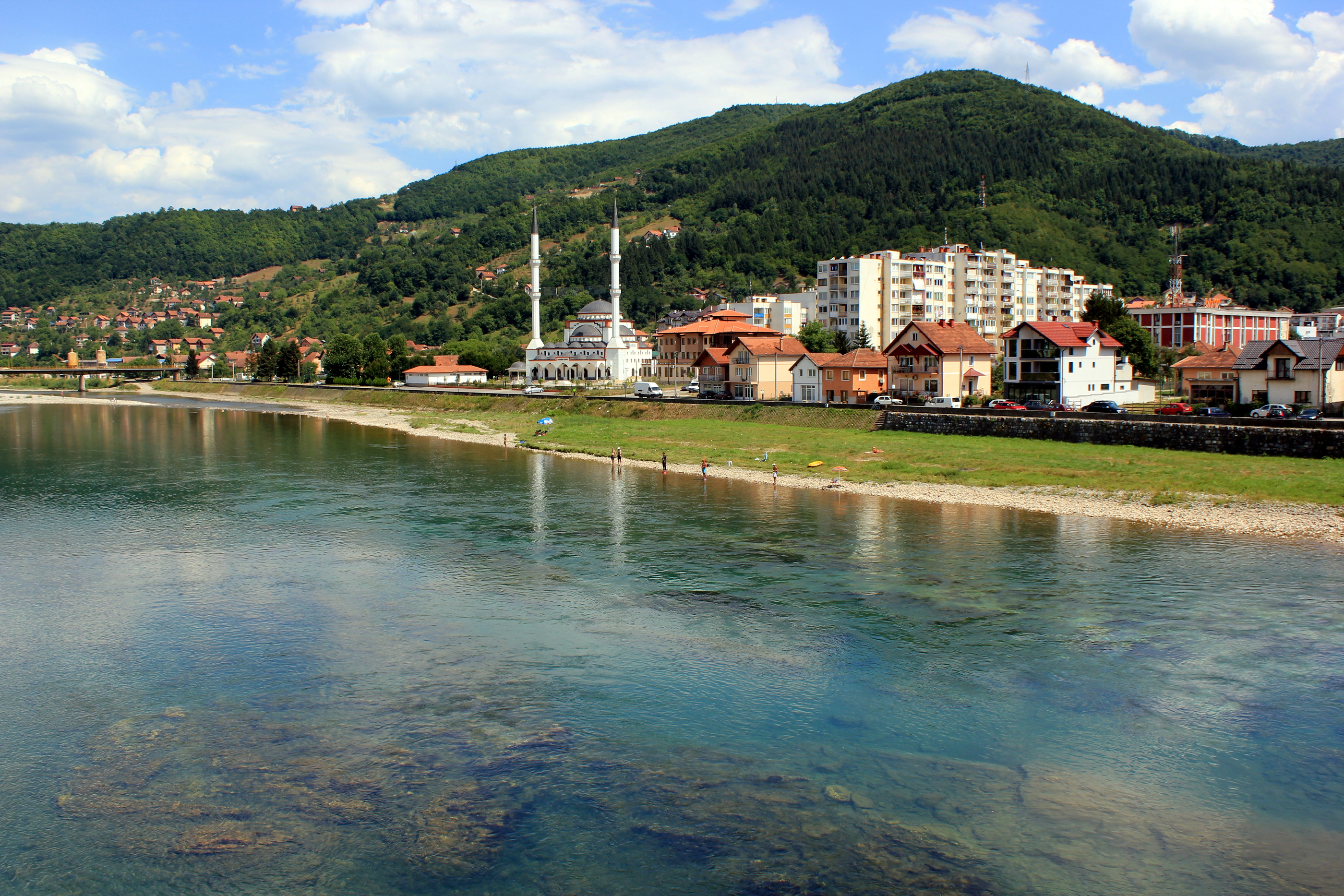
The Drina river in Goražde.

With Gornje Podrinje, Goražde was part of the old Serbian State up to 1376, when it was annexed to the Bosnian State under the reign of King Tvrtko. After Tvrtko's death the town was ruled by the Hum Dukes among whom the best known was Herzog Stjepan Vukčić Kosača.

In 1379, Goražde was first mentioned as a trading settlement and in 1444 as a fortress. The origin of the town's name seems to have come from the Slavonic word "gorazd".

The Goražde market became well known in 1415 when merchants from Dubrovnik had intensive commercial relations with it.

=== Ottoman rule ===
The Ottomans conquered Goražde in 1465 and the place assumed oriental features. In 1477 there were four mahals in the town. From 1550–1557 Mehmed-paša Sokolović built a stone bridge across the Drina and a caravanserai.

During the Turkish rule Goražde was a significant trading centre, being at the crossroads of two important roads: the Bosnian road and the Dubrovnik road. The gross state income from the land amounted to 24,256 akchi in 1477. In 1711 it amounted to 26,000 akchi.

Two mosques built by the Sijerčić beys date back to the 18th century. Near Goražde stands the Eastern Orthodox Church of Saint George, built in 1454 by Stjepan Vukčić Kosača. The Goražde printing house, located in the church complex, worked there from 1519 to 1521. This was the first printing house to be established in Bosnia and Herzegovina and the second in the Balkans.

The composition of the Goražde population can be traced from the times of the Austro-Hungarian occupation. The Orthodox inhabitants originate from Stari Vlah in Sandžak, Brda in Montenegro, Herzegovina and southern Serbia. Aside from a few ancestral inhabitants, the Muslim population began to come in great numbers to Goražde and its surroundings in the 17th century.

The decline of Goražde in the 18th century and the first half of the 19th century is attributed, among other things, to the plague. Up to the middle of the 19th century Goražde was part of the Herzegovinian Sandjak, when it then became part of the Sarajevo Sandjak.

=== Austro-Hungarian rule ===
The period of the Austro-Hungarian occupation was marked by the decline of Goražde, although there was at the same time a certain rise. Due to its geographical position on the border Goražde was during World War I one of the main strongholds of Austria-Hungary used against Serbia and Montenegro.

=== Yugoslavia ===
The interwar Yugoslav Goražde, being no longer a frontier town, had normal conditions under which it developed and prospered.

In 1941 German troops entered the town after an air raid on April 17. Later on Italian troops were also stationed there.

The National Liberation Army took over the town for the first time on January 27, 1942, and remained there until May of the same year. During this period the National Liberation Committees were formed for the town of Goražde on the basis of the Foča Stipulations. At the same time Goražde was the headquarters of the National Liberation Army for eastern Bosnia and Herzegovina. In early March 1942 the Commander-in-Chief, Marshal Tito stayed in Goražde. Goražde was liberated twice more, in 1943 and 1944, and on March 6, 1945 it was finally liberated from the occupation.

From the end of World War II to 1961, a considerable number of groups of families came to live in Goražde from the neighbouring villages and some from other further places, having been attracted by the economic growth of Goražde. According to the census of 1961 Goražde had 8,812 inhabitants.

Before World War II, the industry of Goražde consisted mainly of retail trade and to a certain extent wholesale trade, the catering industry, handicraft and transport. During the occupation, from 1941 to 1945, the industry was destroyed and about 45% of the existing houses as well.

After World War II, a new period marked by a tremendous social and economic rise began. A number of new industrial enterprises have been founded, among which the most significant is a nitrogen factory.

Since then Goražde's industry has been systematically developing, its main branches being manufacturing, building, transport, trade and crafts. In 1981 Goražde's GDP per capita was 70% of the Yugoslav average.

=== Bosnian War ===
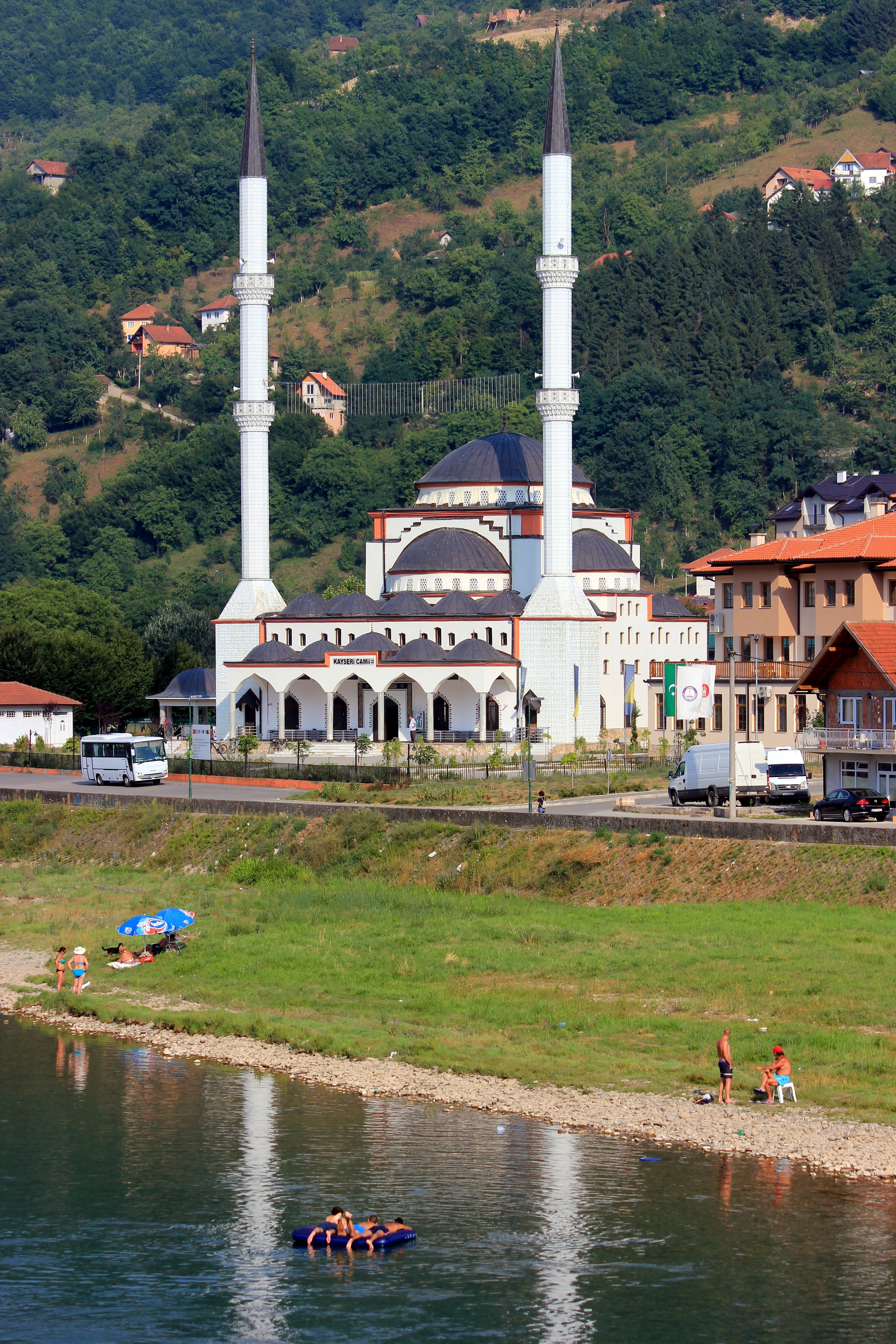
A mosque in Goražde

From 1992 to 1995 during the Bosnian War, Goražde was one of six Bosniak enclaves, along with Srebrenica and Žepa, surrounded and besieged by the Bosnian Serb Army. In April 1993 it was made into a United Nations Safe Area in which the United Nations was supposed to deter attacks on the civilian population. Between March 30 and April 23, 1994, the Serbs launched a major offensive against the town. After air strikes against Serb tanks and outposts and a NATO ultimatum, Serbian forces agreed to withdraw their artillery and armored vehicles 20 km (12 mi) from the town. On 28 May 1995 it was again targeted by the Bosnian Serbs, who launched an assault on UN guard posts, overwhelming 33 British UN servicemen from the Royal Welch Fusiliers manning four observation posts on the west bank of the Drina. The remaining troops, who were stationed on the east bank, managed to slip away and helped Bosniak reinforcements to prevent Bosnian Serbs from taking a key hill overlooking the town. This action is credited with saving the town from suffering the same fate of Srebrenica, where the Bosnian Serbs continued the siege after the failed attempt.

After the Dayton Agreement, a land corridor was established between Goražde and the Federation.

== Settlements ==
- Ahmovići
- Bačci
- Bahovo
- Berić
- Bakije
- Bare
- Bašabulići
- Batkovići
- Bezmilje
- Biljin
- Blagojevići
- Bogdanići
- Bogušići
- Borak Brdo
- Borova
- Borovići
- Bošanje
- Boškovići
- Brajlovići
- Bratiš
- Brekovi
- Brezje
- Brijeg
- Bučje
- Budići
- Butkovići
- Butkovići Ilovača
- Crvica
- Čitluk
- Čovčići
- Čurovi
- Ćatovići
- Ćehajići
- Deševa
- Donja Brda
- Donja Bukvica
- Donje Selo
- Donji Bogovići
- Dragolji
- Dragovići
- Dučići
- Džindići
- Džuha
- Đakovići
- Faočići
- Gaj
- Glamoč
- Gočela
- Gojčevići
- Goražde
- Gornja Brda
- Gornja Bukvica
- Gornji Bogovići
- Grabovik
- Gradac
- Gunjačići
- Gunjevići
- Gusići
- Guskovići
- Hadžići
- Hajradinovići
- Hladila
- Hrančići
- Hrid
- Hrušanj
- Hubjeri
- Ilino
- Ilovača
- Jabuka
- Jagodići
- Jarovići
- Kalac
- Kamen
- Kanlići
- Karauzovići
- Karovići
- Kazagići
- Knjevići
- Kodžaga Polje
- Kola
- Kolijevke
- Kolovarice
- Konjbaba
- Konjevići
- Kosače
- Kostenik
- Kovači
- Kraboriš
- Krašići
- Kreča
- Kučine
- Kušeši
- Kutješi
- Laleta
- Lukarice
- Ljeskovik
- Markovići
- Mašići
- Milanovići
- Mirvići
- Mirvići na Podhranjenu
- Morinac
- Mravi
- Mravinjac
- Mrkovi
- Nekopi
- Nevorići
- Novakovići
- Odžak
- Orahovice
- Oručevac
- Osanica
- Osječani
- Ostružno
- Ozrenovići
- Paraun
- Perjani
- Pijestina
- Pijevac
- Plesi
- Podhomara
- Podhranjen
- Podkozara Donja
- Podkozara Gornja
- Podmeljine
- Poratak
- Potrkuša
- Pribjenovići
- Prisoje
- Prolaz
- Pršeši
- Radići
- Radijevići
- Radmilovići
- Radovovići
- Raškovići
- Ratkovići
- Rešetnica
- Ropovići
- Rosijevići
- Rusanj
- Sedlari
- Seoca
- Sijedac
- Skravnik
- Slatina
- Sofići
- Sopotnica
- Spahovići
- Surovi
- Šabanci
- Šašići
- Šehovići
- Šemihova
- Šovšići
- Šućurići
- Trebeševo
- Tupačići
- Uhotići
- Ušanovići
- Ustiprača
- Utješinovići
- Vitkovići
- Vlahovići
- Vlajčići
- Vraneši
- Vranići
- Vranpotok
- Vrbica
- Vremci
- Vučetići
- Zabus
- Zakalje
- Zapljevac
- Završje
- Zemegresi
- Zidine
- Zorlaci
- Zorovići
- Zubovići
- Zubovići u Oglečevi
- Zupčići
- Žigovi
- Žilići
- Žitovo
- Živojevići
- Žuželo

== Demographics ==
=== Population ===
Population of settlements – Goražde municipality
| | Settlement | 1961. | 1971. | 1981. | 1991. | 2013. |
| | Total | 31,303 | 34,685 | 36,924 | 37,505 | 20,897 |
| 1 | Baćci | | | | 1,421 | 1,120 |
| 2 | Bogušići | | | | 295 | 244 |
| 3 | Budići | | | | 388 | 324 |
| 4 | Čovčići | | | | 356 | 250 |
| 5 | Dučići | | | | 277 | 273 |
| 6 | Goražde | | 9,482 | 13,022 | 16,273 | 12,512 |
| 7 | Grabovik | | | | 284 | 239 |
| 8 | Mravinjac | | | | 387 | 249 |
| 9 | Potrkuša | | | | 144 | 237 |
| 10 | Sedlari | | | | 391 | 211 |
| 11 | Vitkovići | | | | 1,080 | 942 |
| 12 | Zupčići | | | | 792 | 382 |

=== Ethnic composition ===
Ethnic composition – Goražde city
| | 2013. | 1991. | 1981. | 1971. |
| Total | 12,512 (100,0%) | 16,273 (100,0%) | 13,022 (100,0%) | 9,482 (100,0%) |
| Bosniaks | | 9,568 (58,80%) | 6,746 (51,80%) | 5,266 (55,54%) |
| Serbs | | 5,584 (34,31%) | 4,376 (33,60%) | 3,675 (38,76%) |
| Yugoslavs | | 663 (4,074%) | 1,495 (11,48%) | 100 (1,055%) |
| Others | | 396 (2,433%) | 83 (0,637%) | 55 (0,580%) |
| Croats | | 62 (0,381%) | 75 (0,576%) | 133 (1,403%) |
| Montenegrins | | | 198 (1,521%) | 212 (2,236%) |
| Albanians | | | 23 (0,177%) | 17 (0,179%) |
| Macedonians | | | 13 (0,100%) | 10 (0,105%) |
| Slovenes | | | 13 (0,100%) | 14 (0,148%) |

Ethnic composition – Goražde municipality
| | 2013. | 1991. | 1981. | 1971. | 1961. |
| Total | 20,897 (100,0%) | 37,573 (100,0%) | 36,924 (100,0%) | 34,685 (100,0%) | 31,303 (100,0%) |
| Bosniaks | 19,692 (94,23%) | 26,296 (69,99%) | 25,142 (68,09%) | 24,544 (70,76%) | 19,305 (61.67%) |
| Serbs | 707 (3,383%) | 9,843 (26,20%) | 9,107 (24,66%) | 9,293 (26,79%) | 9,569 (30.57%) |
| Others | 475 (2,273%) | 565 (1,504%) | 153 (0,414%) | 115 (0,332%) | 614 (1.96%) |
| Croats | 23 (0,110%) | 80 (0,213%) | 99 (0,268%) | 179 (0,516%) | 314 (1.00%) |
| Yugoslavs | | 789 (2,100%) | 2,017 (5,463%) | 168 (0,484%) | 1,501 (4.80%) |
| Montenegrins | | | 243 (0,658%) | 280 (0,807%) | |
| Roma | | | 89 (0,241%) | 38 (0,110%) | |
| Albanians | | | 41 (0,111%) | 26 (0,075%) | |
| Slovenes | | | 17 (0,046%) | 30 (0,086%) | |
| Macedonians | | | 16 (0,043%) | 12 (0,035%) | |

== Environment ==
=== Natural environment ===
The surrounding region of Goražde is composed of Paleozoic and Permian shales, sandstones and carbon sedimentary rocks. The hills are for the most part rounded and with gentle slopes. The higher ones are composed of limestone. Goražde with its surroundings has a mainly equable and fresh mountainous climate. The average annual temperature is 10.8 °C and the rainfall is fairly evenly distributed throughout the year. The town is supplied with water from six springs. A part of the population gets drinking water from ordinary wells. The construction of a water supply system began in 1962 from a spring in Čajniče, 16.5 km (10.3 mi) from Goražde.

The River Drina has great significance for the founding and development of Goražde.

The greatest floods recorded since the 17th century occurred in 1677, 1731, 1737, 1896, 1911, 1922, 1952, 1974 and 2010.

=== Built environment ===
The main characteristic of the layout of the town is its elongated shape along the Ustiprača–Foča road. From 1465 to 1878 Goražde was part of the Ottoman Empire. In the 18th and 19th centuries Goražde was inhabited by Muslim and Orthodox communities. Up to World War II Goražde was made up of two separate parts: A Muslim and an Orthodox part. Nowadays this divide is disappearing. After World War II the town began to expand and be modernized, new streets were built, public and residential buildings were built in the centre and in the outskirts. From 1945 to 1961, 1130 council flats and 680 private homes were built. In 1961 there were a total of 616 buildings in the town.

== Climate ==
Climate data for Goražde (1961–1990)
| Month | Jan | Feb | Mar | Apr | May | Jun | Jul | Aug | Sep | Oct | Nov | Dec | Year |
|---|---|---|---|---|---|---|---|---|---|---|---|---|---|
| Record high °C (°F) | 17.2 (63.0) | 21.2 (70.2) | 27.0 (80.6) | 31.2 (88.2) | 34.2 (93.6) | 35.8 (96.4) | 38.2 (100.8) | 38.2 (100.8) | 34.8 (94.6) | 30.5 (86.9) | 26.0 (78.8) | 20.6 (69.1) | 38.2 (100.8) |
| Mean daily maximum °C (°F) | 2.6 (36.7) | 7.0 (44.6) | 12.5 (54.5) | 17.0 (62.6) | 22.1 (71.8) | 25.0 (77.0) | 27.4 (81.3) | 27.4 (81.3) | 23.6 (74.5) | 17.2 (63.0) | 9.5 (49.1) | 3.4 (38.1) | 16.2 (61.2) |
| Daily mean °C (°F) | −1.0 (30.2) | 1.8 (35.2) | 5.8 (42.4) | 10.1 (50.2) | 14.5 (58.1) | 17.4 (63.3) | 19.0 (66.2) | 18.7 (65.7) | 15.4 (59.7) | 10.3 (50.5) | 5.0 (41.0) | 0.4 (32.7) | 9.8 (49.6) |
| Mean daily minimum °C (°F) | −4.7 (23.5) | −2.8 (27.0) | −0.4 (31.3) | 3.2 (37.8) | 7.5 (45.5) | 11.1 (52.0) | 12.3 (54.1) | 12.0 (53.6) | 9.6 (49.3) | 5.5 (41.9) | 0.9 (33.6) | −2.8 (27.0) | 4.3 (39.7) |
| Record low °C (°F) | −23.5 (−10.3) | −20.0 (−4.0) | −15.0 (5.0) | −5.0 (23.0) | −2.0 (28.4) | 0.0 (32.0) | 4.5 (40.1) | 3.0 (37.4) | −2.0 (28.4) | −6.0 (21.2) | −16.0 (3.2) | −19.0 (−2.2) | −23.5 (−10.3) |
| Average precipitation mm (inches) | 55.2 (2.17) | 52.9 (2.08) | 51.6 (2.03) | 66.9 (2.63) | 70.6 (2.78) | 80.0 (3.15) | 63.1 (2.48) | 67.2 (2.65) | 68.2 (2.69) | 67.8 (2.67) | 85.1 (3.35) | 71.6 (2.82) | 800.0 (31.50) |
| Average precipitation days (≥ 0.1 mm) | 9.7 | 10.3 | 10.2 | 11.9 | 11.2 | 12.7 | 9.1 | 8.2 | 8.8 | 8.3 | 11.0 | 11.8 | 123.2 |
| Average snowy days (≥ 1.0 cm) | 17.0 | 11.9 | 3.3 | 0.3 | 0.0 | 0.0 | 0.0 | 0.0 | 0.0 | 0.1 | 3.2 | 12.7 | 48.6 |
| Average relative humidity (%) | 89.7 | 87.2 | 83.7 | 80.7 | 80.1 | 80.5 | 79.3 | 80.6 | 83.6 | 87.7 | 89.1 | 90.4 | 84.4 |
Source: Meteorological Institute of Bosnia and Herzegovina

== In literature ==
The 1992–1995 siege of Goražde is the subject of several books, two of which are available in English; both underline the mixture of brutality and humanity that punctuated the era. Savo Heleta's Not My Turn to Die is written by a survivor who was a Bosnian Serb teenager whose family was once under the Serb bombardments and also under suspicion as Serbs in the mostly Bosniak town. Safe Area Goražde is a graphic novel by Joe Sacco, a reporter who visited the besieged town several times during that period.

Another book that is centred heavily on Goražde is No Escape Zone authored by Nick Richardson. Richardson is a former Fleet Air Arm pilot who was shot down in the region of Goražde during a NATO bombing mission. He spent several weeks inside the city and mentions the conditions and daily shelling the residents and UN forces faced. Goraždans from the past (Goraždani iz prošlog vremena) by Hajrudin Somun, Sarajevo: Dobra knjiga, 2022.

== Sports ==
Local football club FK Goražde play in the Bosnian second tier — First League of the Federation of Bosnia and Herzegovina and host their games at the Stadion Midhat Drljević.

Local basketball team KK Radnički Goražde play in the Basketball Championship of Bosnia and Herzegovina and host their games at the City Hall Mirsad Hurić.

== Twin towns – sister cities ==
Goražde is twinned with:

- Adapazarı, Turkey
- Delčevo, North Macedonia
- Gaziemir, Turkey
- Gera, Germany
- Güngören, Turkey
- Karatay, Turkey
- Keçiören, Turkey
- Maragheh, Iran
- Şahinbey, Turkey
- Stari Grad (Sarajevo), Bosnia and Herzegovina

== Notable people ==
- Zaim Imamović, military commander
- Admir Raščić, footballer
- János Vitéz, Danubian humanist, Cardinal Archbishop of Esztergom, Primate of Hungary and Bishop of Várad (1445–1465)
- Isak Samokovlija, writer
- Anabela Atijas, singer
- Kasim Kamenica, handball player and coach
- Džejla Ramović, singer
- Husein Đozo, Islamic theologian
- Stjepan Vukčić Kosača, Herceg/Herzog (duke) of Bosnia
- Rade Jovanović, folksong collector and composer
- Elvir Laković Laka, singer
- Anabela (singer)

== See also ==
- Safe Area Goražde
- Zavičajni muzej Goražde
- Drina Martyrs
