= Čovčići =

- Village
- Location within Bosnia and Herzegovina
- Coordinates: 43°38′N 18°57′E
- Country: Bosnia and Herzegovina
- Entity: Federation of Bosnia and Herzegovina
- Canton: Bosnian-Podrinje Goražde
- Municipality: Goražde

Area
  - Total: 0.51 sq mi (1.33 km^{2})
- Elevation: 1,155 ft (352 m)

Population (2013)
  - Total: 250
  - Density: 490/sq mi (190/km^{2})
- Time zone: UTC+1 (CET)
  - Summer (DST): UTC+2 (CEST)

Čovčići is a suburb in the city of Goražde, Bosnia and Herzegovina.

== Demographics ==
According to the 2013 census, its population was 250.

Ethnicity in 2013
Ethnicity	Number	Percentage
Bosniaks	247	98.8%
other/undeclared	3	1.2%
Total	250	100%
