= Sedlari (Goražde) =

- Village
- Location within Bosnia and Herzegovina
- Coordinates: 43.6479°N 18.8495°E
- Country: Bosnia and Herzegovina
- Entity: Federation of Bosnia and Herzegovina
- Canton: Bosnian-Podrinje Goražde
- Municipality: Goražde

Area
  - Total: 0.31 sq mi (0.81 km^{2})

Population (2013)
  - Total: 211
  - Density: 670/sq mi (260/km^{2})
- Time zone: UTC+1 (CET)
  - Summer (DST): UTC+2 (CEST)

Sedlari is a village in the municipality of Goražde, Bosnia and Herzegovina.

== Demographics ==
According to the 2013 census, its population was 211.

Ethnicity in 2013
Ethnicity	Number	Percentage
Bosniaks	193	91.5%
Serbs	17	8.1%
other/undeclared	1	0.5%
Total	211	100%
