= Prisoje, Goražde =

Prisoje
- Village
- Location within Bosnia and Herzegovina
- Coordinates: 43°39′57″N 18°53′34″E
- Country: Bosnia and Herzegovina
- Entity: Federation of Bosnia and Herzegovina
- Canton: Bosnian-Podrinje Goražde
- Municipality: Goražde

Area
  - Total: 1.07 sq mi (2.77 km^{2})

Population (2013)
  - Total: 8
  - Density: 7.5/sq mi (2.9/km^{2})
- Time zone: UTC+1 (CET)
  - Summer (DST): UTC+2 (CEST)

Prisoje is a village in the municipality of Goražde, Bosnia and Herzegovina.

== Demographics ==
According to the 2013 census, its population was 18.

Ethnicity in 2013
Ethnicity	Number	Percentage
Bosniaks	7	87.5%
Serbs	1	12.5%
Total	18	100%
