= Džindići (Goražde) =

- Village
- Location within Bosnia and Herzegovina
- Coordinates: 43°37′01″N 18°54′52″E
- Country: Bosnia and Herzegovina
- Entity: Federation of Bosnia and Herzegovina
- Canton: Bosnian-Podrinje Goražde
- Municipality: Goražde

Area
  - Total: 0.19 sq mi (0.48 km^{2})
- Elevation: 1,171 ft (357 m)

Population (2013)
  - Total: 96
  - Density: 520/sq mi (200/km^{2})
- Time zone: UTC+1 (CET)
  - Summer (DST): UTC+2 (CEST)

Džindići is a suburb in the city of Goražde, Bosnia and Herzegovina.

== Demographics ==
According to the 2013 census, its population was 96, all Bosniaks.
