= Plesi (Goražde) =

- Village
- Location within Bosnia and Herzegovina
- Coordinates: 43.6472°N 18.8290°E
- Country: Bosnia and Herzegovina
- Entity: Federation of Bosnia and Herzegovina
- Canton: Bosnian-Podrinje Goražde
- Municipality: Goražde

Area
  - Total: 1.22 sq mi (3.17 km^{2})

Population (2013)
  - Total: 42
  - Density: 34/sq mi (13/km^{2})
- Time zone: UTC+1 (CET)
  - Summer (DST): UTC+2 (CEST)

Plesi is a village in the municipality of Goražde, Bosnia and Herzegovina.

== Demographics ==
According to the 2013 census, its population was 42.

Ethnicity in 2013
Ethnicity	Number	Percentage
Bosniaks	38	90.5%
other/undeclared	4	9.5%
Total	42	100%
