= Ratkovići (Goražde) =

Ratkovići Ратковићи
- Village
- Location within Bosnia and Herzegovina
- Coordinates: 43°37′54″N 18°55′21″E
- Country: Bosnia and Herzegovina
- Entity: Federation of Bosnia and Herzegovina
- Canton: Bosnian-Podrinje Goražde
- Municipality: Goražde

Area
  - Total: 0.44 sq mi (1.15 km^{2})

Population (2013)
  - Total: 141
  - Density: 318/sq mi (123/km^{2})
- Time zone: UTC+1 (CET)
  - Summer (DST): UTC+2 (CEST)

Ratkovići is a village in the municipality of Goražde, Bosnia and Herzegovina.

== Demographics ==
According to the 2013 census, its population was 141, all Bosniaks.
