= Crvica (Goražde) =

Crvica Црвица
- Village
- Location within Bosnia and Herzegovina
- Coordinates: 43.6903°N 18.7613°E
- Country: Bosnia and Herzegovina
- Entity: Federation of Bosnia and Herzegovina
- Canton: Bosnian-Podrinje Goražde
- Municipality: Goražde

Area
  - Total: 0.83 sq mi (2.16 km^{2})

Population (2013)
  - Total: 3
  - Density: 3.6/sq mi (1.4/km^{2})
- Time zone: UTC+1 (CET)
  - Summer (DST): UTC+2 (CEST)

Crvica is a village in the municipality of Goražde, Bosnia and Herzegovina.

== Demographics ==
According to the 2013 census, its population was 3, all Bosniaks.
