= Vranići, Bosnia and Herzegovina =

Vranići Вранићи
- Village
- Location within Bosnia and Herzegovina
- Coordinates: 43°37′29″N 18°54′47″E
- Country: Bosnia and Herzegovina
- Entity: Federation of Bosnia and Herzegovina
- Canton: Bosnian-Podrinje Goražde
- Municipality: Goražde

Area
  - Total: 0.42 sq mi (1.09 km^{2})

Population (2013)
  - Total: 106
  - Density: 252/sq mi (97.2/km^{2})
- Time zone: UTC+1 (CET)
  - Summer (DST): UTC+2 (CEST)

Vranići is a village in the municipality of Goražde, Bosnia and Herzegovina.

== Demographics ==
According to the 2013 census, its population was 106, all Bosniaks.
