= Sofići =

- Village
- Location within Bosnia and Herzegovina
- Coordinates: 43°41′44″N 18°48′04″E
- Country: Bosnia and Herzegovina
- Entity: Federation of Bosnia and Herzegovina
- Canton: Bosnian-Podrinje Goražde
- Municipality: Goražde

Area
  - Total: 0.46 sq mi (1.20 km^{2})

Population (2013)
  - Total: 5
  - Density: 11/sq mi (4.2/km^{2})
- Time zone: UTC+1 (CET)
  - Summer (DST): UTC+2 (CEST)

Sofići is a village in the municipality of Goražde, Bosnia and Herzegovina.

== Demographics ==
According to the 2013 census, its population was five, all Bosniaks.
