= Glamoč, Goražde =

Glamoč Гламоч
- Village
- Location within Bosnia and Herzegovina
- Coordinates: 43°40′31″N 18°57′35″E
- Country: Bosnia and Herzegovina
- Entity: Federation of Bosnia and Herzegovina
- Canton: Bosnian-Podrinje Goražde
- Municipality: Goražde

Area
  - Total: 0.88 sq mi (2.29 km^{2})
- Elevation: 1,293 ft (394 m)

Population (2013)
  - Total: 51
  - Density: 58/sq mi (22/km^{2})
- Time zone: UTC+1 (CET)
  - Summer (DST): UTC+2 (CEST)

Glamoč is a suburb in the city of Goražde, Bosnia and Herzegovina.

== Demographics ==
According to the 2013 census, its population was 51.

Ethnicity in 2013
Ethnicity	Number	Percentage
Bosniaks	36	70.6%
Serbs	15	29.4%
Total	51	100%
