= Gunjevići =

- Village
- Location within Bosnia and Herzegovina
- Coordinates: 43°36′15″N 18°52′43″E
- Country: Bosnia and Herzegovina
- Entity: Federation of Bosnia and Herzegovina
- Canton: Bosnian-Podrinje Goražde
- Municipality: Goražde

Area
  - Total: 0.48 sq mi (1.25 km^{2})

Population (2013)
  - Total: 34
  - Density: 70/sq mi (27/km^{2})
- Time zone: UTC+1 (CET)
  - Summer (DST): UTC+2 (CEST)

Gunjevići is a village in the municipality of Goražde, Bosnia and Herzegovina.

== Demographics ==
According to the 2013 census, its population was 34.

Ethnicity in 2013
Ethnicity	Number	Percentage
Bosniaks	32	94.1%
other/undeclared	2	5.9%
Total	34	100%
