= Osječani (Goražde) =

- Village
- Location within Bosnia and Herzegovina
- Coordinates: 43°43′06″N 18°54′13″E
- Country: Bosnia and Herzegovina
- Entity: Federation of Bosnia and Herzegovina
- Canton: Bosnian-Podrinje Goražde
- Municipality: Goražde

Area
  - Total: 1.73 sq mi (4.49 km^{2})

Population (2013)
  - Total: 53
  - Density: 31/sq mi (12/km^{2})
- Time zone: UTC+1 (CET)
  - Summer (DST): UTC+2 (CEST)

Osječani is a village in the municipality of Goražde, Bosnia and Herzegovina.

== Demographics ==
According to the 2013 census, its population was 53.

Ethnicity in 2013
Ethnicity	Number	Percentage
Bosniaks	50	94.3%
Serbs	3	5.7%
Total	53	100%
