= Grabovik (Goražde) =

- Village
- Location within Bosnia and Herzegovina
- Coordinates: 43°34′51″N 18°45′33″E
- Country: Bosnia and Herzegovina
- Entity: Federation of Bosnia and Herzegovina
- Canton: Bosnian-Podrinje Goražde
- Municipality: Goražde

Area
  - Total: 0.22 sq mi (0.56 km^{2})
- Elevation: 1,300 ft (400 m)

Population (2013)
  - Total: 239
  - Density: 1,100/sq mi (430/km^{2})
- Time zone: UTC+1 (CET)
  - Summer (DST): UTC+2 (CEST)

Grabovik is a neighbourhood in the city of Goražde, Bosnia and Herzegovina.

== Demographics ==
According to the 2013 census, its population was 239.

Ethnicity in 2013
Ethnicity	Number	Percentage
Bosniaks	233	97.5%
Croats	1	0.4%
Serbs	1	0.4%
other/undeclared	4	1.7%
Total	239	100%
