= Gunjačići =

- Village
- Location within Bosnia and Herzegovina
- Coordinates: 43°39′N 18°53′E
- Country: Bosnia and Herzegovina
- Entity: Federation of Bosnia and Herzegovina
- Canton: Bosnian-Podrinje Goražde
- Municipality: Goražde

Area
  - Total: 0.81 sq mi (2.10 km^{2})

Population (2013)
  - Total: 18
  - Density: 22/sq mi (8.6/km^{2})
- Time zone: UTC+1 (CET)
  - Summer (DST): UTC+2 (CEST)

Gunjačići is a village in the municipality of Goražde, Bosnia and Herzegovina.

== Demographics ==
According to the 2013 census, its population was 18.

Ethnicity in 2013
| Ethnicity | Number | Percentage |
|---|---|---|
| Bosniaks | 17 | 94.4% |
| other/undeclared | 1 | 5.6% |
| Total | 18 | 100% |
