= Rešetnica =

- Village
- Location within Bosnia and Herzegovina
- Coordinates: 43.6450°N 18.8612°E
- Country: Bosnia and Herzegovina
- Entity: Federation of Bosnia and Herzegovina
- Canton: Bosnian-Podrinje Goražde
- Municipality: Goražde

Area
  - Total: 0.86 sq mi (2.24 km^{2})

Population (2013)
  - Total: 89
  - Density: 100/sq mi (40/km^{2})
- Time zone: UTC+1 (CET)
  - Summer (DST): UTC+2 (CEST)

Rešetnica is a village in the municipality of Goražde, Bosnia and Herzegovina.

== Demographics ==
According to the 2013 census, its population was 89.

Ethnicity in 2013
Ethnicity	Number	Percentage
Bosniaks	84	94.4%
other/undeclared	5	5.6%
Total	89	100%
