= Završje (Goražde) =

- Village
- Location within Bosnia and Herzegovina
- Coordinates: 43°39′28″N 18°55′37″E
- Country: Bosnia and Herzegovina
- Entity: Federation of Bosnia and Herzegovina
- Canton: Bosnian-Podrinje Goražde
- Municipality: Goražde

Area
  - Total: 1.91 sq mi (4.94 km^{2})

Population (2013)
  - Total: 3
  - Density: 1.6/sq mi (0.61/km^{2})
- Time zone: UTC+1 (CET)
  - Summer (DST): UTC+2 (CEST)

Završje is a village in the municipality of Goražde, Bosnia and Herzegovina.

== Demographics ==
According to the 2013 census, its population was 3, all Serbs.
