= Vrbica (Goražde) =

Vrbica Врбица
- Village
- Location within Bosnia and Herzegovina
- Coordinates: 43°35′37″N 18°45′53″E
- Country: Bosnia and Herzegovina
- Entity: Federation of Bosnia and Herzegovina
- Canton: Bosnian-Podrinje Goražde
- Municipality: Goražde

Area
  - Total: 0.13 sq mi (0.34 km^{2})

Population (2013)
  - Total: 13
  - Density: 99/sq mi (38/km^{2})
- Time zone: UTC+1 (CET)
  - Summer (DST): UTC+2 (CEST)

Vrbica is a village in the municipality of Goražde, Bosnia and Herzegovina.

== Demographics ==
According to the 2013 census, its population was 13, all Bosniaks.
