= Ilino, Goražde =

Ilino Илино
- Village
- Location within Bosnia and Herzegovina
- Coordinates: 43°43′N 18°55′E
- Country: Bosnia and Herzegovina
- Entity: Federation of Bosnia and Herzegovina
- Canton: Bosnian-Podrinje Goražde
- Municipality: Goražde

Area
  - Total: 0.61 sq mi (1.59 km^{2})

Population (2013)
  - Total: 2
  - Density: 3.3/sq mi (1.3/km^{2})
- Time zone: UTC+1 (CET)
  - Summer (DST): UTC+2 (CEST)

Ilino (Cyrillic: Илино) is a village in the municipality of Goražde, Bosnia and Herzegovina.

== Demographics ==
According to the 2013 census, its population was 2, both Bosniaks.
