= Ćurovi =

- Village
- Location within Bosnia and Herzegovina
- Coordinates: 43°42′N 18°58′E
- Country: Bosnia and Herzegovina
- Entity: Federation of Bosnia and Herzegovina
- Canton: Bosnian-Podrinje Goražde
- Municipality: Goražde

Area
  - Total: 0.19 sq mi (0.48 km^{2})
- Elevation: 2,590 ft (790 m)

Population (2013)
  - Total: 1
  - Density: 5.4/sq mi (2.1/km^{2})
- Time zone: UTC+1 (CET)
  - Summer (DST): UTC+2 (CEST)

Ćurovi is a village in the municipality of Goražde, Bosnia and Herzegovina.

== Demographics ==
According to the 2013 census, its population was just 1, a Bosniak.
