= Podhranjen =

- Village
- Location within Bosnia and Herzegovina
- Coordinates: 43°41′56″N 18°56′19″E
- Country: Bosnia and Herzegovina
- Entity: Federation of Bosnia and Herzegovina
- Canton: Bosnian-Podrinje Goražde
- Municipality: Goražde

Area
  - Total: 0.75 sq mi (1.95 km^{2})

Population (2013)
  - Total: 12
  - Density: 16/sq mi (6.2/km^{2})
- Time zone: UTC+1 (CET)
  - Summer (DST): UTC+2 (CEST)

Podhranjen is a village in the municipality of Goražde, Bosnia and Herzegovina.

== Demographics ==
According to the 2013 census, its population was 12.

Ethnicity in 2013
Ethnicity	Number	Percentage
Bosniaks	8	
Serbs	10	
Total	18	
