= Budići =

- Village
- Location within Bosnia and Herzegovina
- Coordinates: 43°39′47″N 18°57′38″E
- Country: Bosnia and Herzegovina
- Entity: Federation of Bosnia and Herzegovina
- Canton: Bosnian-Podrinje Goražde
- Municipality: Goražde

Area
  - Total: 0.13 sq mi (0.33 km^{2})
- Elevation: 1,480 ft (450 m)

Population (2013)
  - Total: 324
  - Density: 2,500/sq mi (980/km^{2})
- Time zone: UTC+1 (CET)
  - Summer (DST): UTC+2 (CEST)

Budići Gorazde is a neighbourhood in the city of Goražde, Bosnia and Herzegovina.

== Demographics ==
According to the 2013 census, its population was 324.

Ethnicity in 2013
Ethnicity	Number	Percentage
Bosniaks	321	99.1%
other/undeclared	3	0.9%
Total	324	100%
