= Vlajčići =

- Village
- Location within Bosnia and Herzegovina
- Coordinates: 43°40′35″N 18°51′07″E
- Country: Bosnia and Herzegovina
- Entity: Federation of Bosnia and Herzegovina
- Canton: Bosnian-Podrinje Goražde
- Municipality: Goražde

Area
  - Total: 0.72 sq mi (1.87 km^{2})

Population (2013)
  - Total: 36
  - Density: 50/sq mi (19/km^{2})
- Time zone: UTC+1 (CET)
  - Summer (DST): UTC+2 (CEST)

Vlajčići is a village in the municipality of Goražde, Bosnia and Herzegovina.

== Demographics ==
According to the 2013 census, its population was 36, all Bosniaks.
