= Bačci =

- Village
- Location within Bosnia and Herzegovina
- Coordinates: 43°39′N 18°58′E
- Country: Bosnia and Herzegovina
- Entity: Federation of Bosnia and Herzegovina
- Canton: Bosnian-Podrinje Goražde
- Municipality: Goražde

Area
  - Total: 0.44 sq mi (1.14 km^{2})
- Elevation: 1,145 ft (349 m)

Population (2013)
  - Total: 1,120
  - Density: 2,540/sq mi (982/km^{2})
- Time zone: UTC+1 (CET)
  - Summer (DST): UTC+2 (CEST)

Bačci is a neighbourhood in the city of Goražde, Bosnia and Herzegovina.

== Demographics ==
According to the 2013 census, its population was 1,120.

Ethnicity in 2013
| Ethnicity | Number | Percentage |
|---|---|---|
| Bosniaks | 1,092 | 97.5% |
| Serbs | 13 | 1.2% |
| other/undeclared | 15 | 1.3% |
| Total | 1,120 | 100% |
