= Zavičajni muzej Goražde =

Coordinates: 43.6648°N 18.9739°E

Native Museum of Goražde
- Zavičajni muzej Goražde
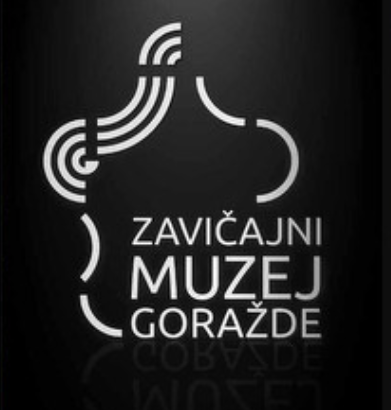
- Established: 2016
- Location: Goražde, Bosnia and Herzegovina
- Type: Native Heritage Museum
- Collections: Archaeological, Historical, Ethnological
- Curator: Adi Džemidžić
- Website: Official website

The Native Museum of Goražde (Bosnian: Zavičajni muzej Goražde) is a museum dedicated to preserving and presenting the cultural heritage of Goražde, a town in Bosnia and Herzegovina. Established in 2016, the museum serves as an important cultural, educational, and historical institution that documents the diverse past of the region.

== History ==
The museum was founded in 2016 by a group of local enthusiasts and cultural organizations operating under the auspices of the Centar za kulturu (Center for Culture) in Goražde. Its inaugural exhibition, titled "Ratna izložba" (War Exhibition), was symbolically opened on 18 September 2016. This exhibition highlighted personal artifacts and testimonies from the period of 1992–1995, when Goražde experienced a prolonged siege during the Bosnian War.

The establishment of the museum was further supported by local government bodies and cultural foundations, including contributions from the Fondacija "Kulturno naslijeđe bez granica", which assisted in the development of the museum’s concept and initial exhibits.

== Collections ==
The museum organizes its holdings into three main collections:

- Archaeological Collection: Features artifacts that span from prehistoric times to the medieval period, underscoring the long history of human settlement in the region.
- Historical Collection: Includes documents, photographs, and personal belongings that document the local history, with a significant focus on the events of the 1990s.
- Ethnological Collection: Showcases objects related to the traditional customs, clothing, and everyday life of the people of Goražde.

These collections provide visitors with insights into the cultural and historical evolution of the area and illustrate the resilience and creativity of its inhabitants.

== Mission and impact ==
The Native Museum of Goražde is committed to acting as a cultural hub that not only safeguards historical artifacts but also educates the public about the town’s unique heritage. By offering a range of exhibitions and educational programs, the museum plays a vital role in fostering local identity, promoting cultural tourism, and ensuring that the collective memory of past hardships and achievements is preserved for future generations.

== See also ==
- Culture of Bosnia and Herzegovina
- History of Goražde
- List of museums in Bosnia and Herzegovina
