= Brekovi =

- Village
- Location within Bosnia and Herzegovina
- Coordinates: 43°40′N 18°54′E
- Country: Bosnia and Herzegovina
- Entity: Federation of Bosnia and Herzegovina
- Canton: Bosnian-Podrinje Goražde
- Municipality: Goražde

Area
  - Total: 0.63 sq mi (1.64 km^{2})
- Elevation: 1,870 ft (570 m)

Population (2013)
  - Total: 14
  - Density: 22/sq mi (8.5/km^{2})
- Time zone: UTC+1 (CET)
  - Summer (DST): UTC+2 (CEST)

Brekovi is a village in the municipality of Goražde, Bosnia and Herzegovina.

== Demographics ==
According to the 2013 census, its population was 14.

Ethnicity in 2013
Ethnicity	Number	Percentage
Bosniaks	9	64.3%
Serbs	5	35.7%
Total	14	100%
