= Konjevići (Goražde) =

Konjevići Коњевићи
- Village
- Location within Bosnia and Herzegovina
- Coordinates: 43°39′11″N 18°49′31″E
- Country: Bosnia and Herzegovina
- Entity: Federation of Bosnia and Herzegovina
- Canton: Bosnian-Podrinje Goražde
- Municipality: Goražde

Area
  - Total: 1.07 sq mi (2.78 km^{2})

Population (2013)
  - Total: 47
  - Density: 44/sq mi (17/km^{2})
- Time zone: UTC+1 (CET)
  - Summer (DST): UTC+2 (CEST)

Konjevići is a village in the municipality of Goražde, Bosnia and Herzegovina.

== Demographics ==
According to the 2013 census, its population was 47, all Bosniaks.
