= Kodžaga Polje =

- Village
- Location within Bosnia and Herzegovina
- Coordinates: 43°37′N 18°57′E
- Country: Bosnia and Herzegovina
- Entity: Federation of Bosnia and Herzegovina
- Canton: Bosnian-Podrinje Goražde
- Municipality: Goražde

Area
  - Total: 0.39 sq mi (1.02 km^{2})

Population (2013)
  - Total: 30
  - Density: 76/sq mi (29/km^{2})
- Time zone: UTC+1 (CET)
  - Summer (DST): UTC+2 (CEST)

Kodžaga Polje is a village in the municipality of Goražde, Bosnia and Herzegovina.

== Demographics ==
According to the 2013 census, its population was 30.

Ethnicity in 2013
Ethnicity	Number	Percentage
Bosniaks	28	93.3%
other/undeclared	2	6.7%
Total	30	100%
