= Poratak =

- Village
- Location within Bosnia and Herzegovina
- Coordinates: 43°37′42″N 18°50′46″E
- Country: Bosnia and Herzegovina
- Entity: Federation of Bosnia and Herzegovina
- Canton: Bosnian-Podrinje Goražde
- Municipality: Goražde

Area
  - Total: 0.39 sq mi (1.01 km^{2})

Population (2013)
  - Total: 72
  - Density: 180/sq mi (71/km^{2})
- Time zone: UTC+1 (CET)
  - Summer (DST): UTC+2 (CEST)

Poratak is a village in the municipality of Goražde, Bosnia and Herzegovina.

== Demographics ==
According to the 2013 census, its population was 72, all Bosniaks.
