= Uhotići =

- Village
- Location within Bosnia and Herzegovina
- Coordinates: 43°37′00″N 18°57′14″E
- Country: Bosnia and Herzegovina
- Entity: Federation of Bosnia and Herzegovina
- Region Canton: East Sarajevo; Bosnian-Podrinje Goražde
- Municipality: Novo Goražde; Goražde

Area
  - Total: 1.69 sq mi (4.39 km^{2})

Population (2013)
  - Total: 4
  - Density: 2.4/sq mi (0.91/km^{2})
- Time zone: UTC+1 (CET)
  - Summer (DST): UTC+2 (CEST)

Uhotići is a village in the municipalities of Novo Goražde, Republika Srpska and Goražde, Bosnia and Herzegovina.

== Demographics ==
According to the 2013 census, its population was 4, all living in the Goražde part, thus none living in the Novo Goražde part.

Ethnicity in 2013
Ethnicity	Number	Percentage
Bosniaks	2	50.0%
Serbs	2	50.0%
Total	4	100%
