= Utješinovići =

- Village
- Location within Bosnia and Herzegovina
- Coordinates: 43°40′N 18°48′E
- Country: Bosnia and Herzegovina
- Entity: Federation of Bosnia and Herzegovina
- Canton: Bosnian-Podrinje Goražde
- Municipality: Goražde

Area
  - Total: 0.56 sq mi (1.44 km^{2})

Population (2013)
  - Total: 22
  - Density: 40/sq mi (15/km^{2})
- Time zone: UTC+1 (CET)
  - Summer (DST): UTC+2 (CEST)

Utješinovići is a Bosniak village in the municipality of Goražde, Bosnia and Herzegovina, with 22 residents in 2013.
