= Vremci =

- Village
- Location within Bosnia and Herzegovina
- Coordinates: 43.6155°N 18.9414°E
- Country: Bosnia and Herzegovina
- Entity: Federation of Bosnia and Herzegovina
- Canton: Bosnian-Podrinje Goražde
- Municipality: Goražde

Area
  - Total: 0.10 sq mi (0.26 km^{2})

Population (2013)
  - Total: 21
  - Density: 210/sq mi (81/km^{2})
- Time zone: UTC+1 (CET)
  - Summer (DST): UTC+2 (CEST)

Vremci is a village in the municipality of Goražde, Bosnia and Herzegovina.

== Demographics ==
According to the 2013 census, its population was 21, all Bosniaks.
