= Ostružno, Bosnia and Herzegovina =

Ostružno
- Village
- Location within Bosnia and Herzegovina
- Coordinates: 43°42′N 18°56′E
- Country: Bosnia and Herzegovina
- Entity: Federation of Bosnia and Herzegovina
- Canton: Bosnian-Podrinje Goražde
- Municipality: Goražde

Area
  - Total: 0.68 sq mi (1.75 km^{2})

Population (2013)
  - Total: 1
  - Density: 1.5/sq mi (0.57/km^{2})
- Time zone: UTC+1 (CET)
  - Summer (DST): UTC+2 (CEST)

Ostružno is a village in the municipality of Goražde, Bosnia and Herzegovina.

== Demographics ==
According to the 2013 census, its population was just 1, a Serb.
