= Potrkuša =

- Village
- Location within Bosnia and Herzegovina
- Coordinates: 43°37′N 18°56′E
- Country: Bosnia and Herzegovina
- Entity: Federation of Bosnia and Herzegovina
- Canton: Bosnian-Podrinje Goražde
- Municipality: Goražde

Area
  - Total: 0.41 sq mi (1.05 km^{2})

Population (2013)
  - Total: 237
  - Density: 585/sq mi (226/km^{2})
- Time zone: UTC+1 (CET)
  - Summer (DST): UTC+2 (CEST)

Potrkuša is a village in the municipality of Goražde, Bosnia and Herzegovina.

== Demographics ==
According to the 2013 census, its population was 237.

Ethnicity in 2013
Ethnicity	Number	Percentage
Bosniaks	222	93.7%
other/undeclared	15	6.3%
Total	237	100%
