= Kazagići (Goražde) =

- Village
- Location within Bosnia and Herzegovina
- Coordinates: 43°40′28″N 18°59′33″E
- Country: Bosnia and Herzegovina
- Entity: Federation of Bosnia and Herzegovina
- Canton: Bosnian-Podrinje Goražde
- Municipality: Goražde

Area
  - Total: 0.53 sq mi (1.38 km^{2})

Population (2013)
  - Total: 178
  - Density: 334/sq mi (129/km^{2})
- Time zone: UTC+1 (CET)
  - Summer (DST): UTC+2 (CEST)

Kazagići is a village in the municipality of Goražde, Bosnia and Herzegovina.

== Demographics ==
According to the 2013 census, its population was 178.

Ethnicity in 2013
Ethnicity	Number	Percentage
Bosniaks	174	97.8%
Serbs	2	1.1%
other/undeclared	2	1.1%
Total	178	100%
