= Vranpotok =

- Village
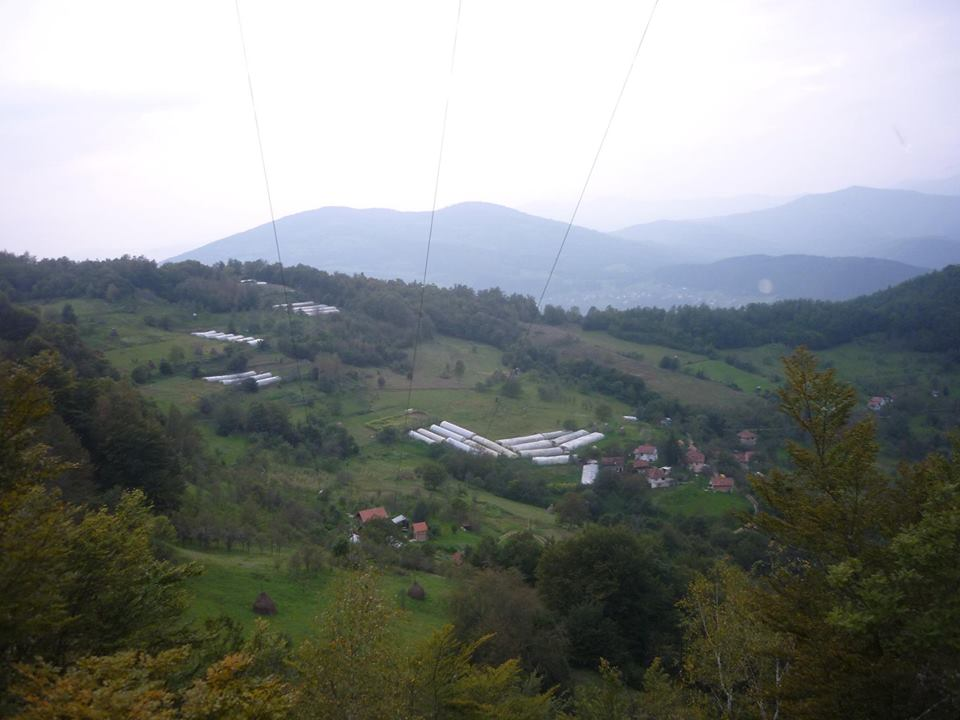

- Location within Bosnia and Herzegovina
- Coordinates: 43°40′N 19°00′E
- Country: Bosnia and Herzegovina
- Entity: Federation of Bosnia and Herzegovina
- Canton: Bosnian-Podrinje Goražde
- Municipality: Goražde

Area
  - Total: 0.28 sq mi (0.72 km^{2})

Population (2013)
  - Total: 30
  - Density: 110/sq mi (42/km^{2})
- Time zone: UTC+1 (CET)
  - Summer (DST): UTC+2 (CEST)

Vranpotok is a village in the municipality of Goražde, Bosnia and Herzegovina.

== Demographics ==
According to the 2013 census, its population was 30.

Ethnicity in 2013
Ethnicity	Number	Percentage
Bosniaks	29	96.7%
other/undeclared	1	3.3%
Total	30	100%
