= Pijestina =

- Village
- Location within Bosnia and Herzegovina
- Coordinates: 43°38′N 18°52′E
- Country: Bosnia and Herzegovina
- Entity: Federation of Bosnia and Herzegovina
- Canton: Bosnian-Podrinje Goražde
- Municipality: Goražde

Area
  - Total: 0.72 sq mi (1.86 km^{2})

Population (2013)
  - Total: 22
  - Density: 31/sq mi (12/km^{2})
- Time zone: UTC+1 (CET)
  - Summer (DST): UTC+2 (CEST)

Pijestina is a village in the municipality of Goražde, Bosnia and Herzegovina.

== Demographics ==
According to the 2013 census, its population was 22, all Bosniaks.
