= Brajlovići =

- Village
- Location within Bosnia and Herzegovina
- Coordinates: 43°40′38″N 18°52′42″E
- Country: Bosnia and Herzegovina
- Entity: Federation of Bosnia and Herzegovina
- Canton: Bosnian-Podrinje Goražde
- Municipality: Goražde

Area
  - Total: 0.24 sq mi (0.63 km^{2})
- Elevation: 2,000 ft (600 m)

Population (2013)
  - Total: 29
  - Density: 120/sq mi (46/km^{2})
- Time zone: UTC+1 (CET)
  - Summer (DST): UTC+2 (CEST)

Brajlovići is a village in the municipality of Goražde, Bosnia and Herzegovina.

== Demographics ==
According to the 2013 census, its population was 29, all Bosniaks.
