= Bogušići =

- Village
- Location within Bosnia and Herzegovina
- Coordinates: 43°38′N 18°55′E
- Country: Bosnia and Herzegovina
- Entity: Federation of Bosnia and Herzegovina
- Canton: Bosnian-Podrinje Goražde
- Municipality: Goražde

Area
  - Total: 0.55 sq mi (1.43 km^{2})
- Elevation: 1,440 ft (440 m)

Population (2013)
  - Total: 244
  - Density: 442/sq mi (171/km^{2})
- Time zone: UTC+1 (CET)
  - Summer (DST): UTC+2 (CEST)

Bogušići is a village in the municipality of Goražde, Bosnia and Herzegovina.

== Demographics ==
According to the 2013 census, its population was 244, all Bosniaks.
