= Kamen (Goražde) =

- Village
- Location within Bosnia and Herzegovina
- Coordinates: 43°38′01″N 18°55′49″E
- Country: Bosnia and Herzegovina
- Entity: Federation of Bosnia and Herzegovina
- Canton: Bosnian-Podrinje Goražde
- Municipality: Goražde

Area
  - Total: 1.03 sq mi (2.67 km^{2})

Population (2013)
  - Total: 58
  - Density: 56/sq mi (22/km^{2})
- Time zone: UTC+1 (CET)
  - Summer (DST): UTC+2 (CEST)

Kamen is a village in the municipality of Goražde, Bosnia and Herzegovina.

== Demographics ==
According to the 2013 census, its population was 58.

Ethnicity in 2013
Ethnicity	Number	Percentage
Bosniaks	46	79.3%
Serbs	12	20.7%
Total	58	100%
