= Zubovići u Oglečevi =

Zubovići u Oglečevi Зубовићи у Оглечеви
- Village
- Location within Bosnia and Herzegovina
- Coordinates: 43°35′53″N 18°57′32″E
- Country: Bosnia and Herzegovina
- Entity: Republika Srpska
- Canton: Bosnian-Podrinje Goražde
- Municipality: Novo Goražde

Area
  - Total: 2.48 km^{2} (0.96 sq mi)

Population (2013)
  - Total: 82
  - Density: 33/km^{2} (86/sq mi)
- Time zone: UTC+1 (CET)
  - Summer (DST): UTC+2 (CEST)

Zubovići u Oglečevi (Serbian Cyrillic: Зубовићи у Оглечеви) is a village in the municipality of Novo Goražde, Republika Srpska, Bosnia and Herzegovina.

== Demographics ==
According to the 2013 census, its population was 82, all Bosniaks.
