= Ušanovići =

- Village
- Location within Bosnia and Herzegovina
- Coordinates: 43°41′08″N 18°57′14″E
- Country: Bosnia and Herzegovina
- Entity: Federation of Bosnia and Herzegovina
- Canton: Bosnian-Podrinje Goražde
- Municipality: Goražde

Area
  - Total: 0.60 sq mi (1.55 km^{2})

Population (2013)
  - Total: 41
  - Density: 69/sq mi (26/km^{2})
- Time zone: UTC+1 (CET)
  - Summer (DST): UTC+2 (CEST)

Ušanovići is a village in the municipality of Goražde, Bosnia and Herzegovina.

== Demographics ==
According to the 2013 census, its population was 41.

Ethnicity in 2013
| Ethnicity | Number | Percentage |
|---|---|---|
| Roma | 29 | 70.7% |
| Serbs | 11 | 26.8% |
| Bosniaks | 1 | 2.4% |
| Total | 41 | 100% |
