= Ozrenovići =

- Village
- Location within Bosnia and Herzegovina
- Country: Bosnia and Herzegovina
- Entity: Federation of Bosnia and Herzegovina
- Canton: Bosnian-Podrinje Goražde
- Municipality: Goražde

Area
  - Total: 0.22 sq mi (0.56 km^{2})

Population (2013)
  - Total: 38
  - Density: 180/sq mi (68/km^{2})
- Time zone: UTC+1 (CET)
  - Summer (DST): UTC+2 (CEST)

Ozrenovići is a village in the municipality of Goražde, Bosnia and Herzegovina.

== Demographics ==
According to the 2013 census, its population was 38.

Ethnicity in 2013
Ethnicity	Number	Percentage
Bosniaks	37	97.4%
other/undeclared	1	2.6%
Total	38	100%
