= Mravinjac, Bosnia and Herzegovina =

Mravinjac
- Village
- Location within Bosnia and Herzegovina
- Coordinates: 43°38′N 18°56′E
- Country: Bosnia and Herzegovina
- Entity: Federation of Bosnia and Herzegovina
- Canton: Bosnian-Podrinje Goražde
- Municipality: Goražde

Area
  - Total: 0.24 sq mi (0.62 km^{2})
- Elevation: 1,198 ft (365 m)

Population (2013)
  - Total: 249
  - Density: 1,000/sq mi (400/km^{2})
- Time zone: UTC+1 (CET)
  - Summer (DST): UTC+2 (CEST)

Mravinjac is a suburb in the city of Goražde, Bosnia and Herzegovina.

== Demographics ==
According to the 2013 census, its population was 249.

Ethnicity in 2013
Ethnicity	Number	Percentage
Bosniaks	245	98.4%
other/undeclared	4	1.6%
Total	249	100%
