= Komanje Brdo =

- Village
- Location within Bosnia and Herzegovina
- Coordinates: 43.0790771°N 17.9868271°E
- Country: Bosnia and Herzegovina
- Entity: Federation of Bosnia and Herzegovina
- Canton: Herzegovina-Neretva
- Municipality: Stolac

Area
  - Total: 3.14 sq mi (8.12 km^{2})

Population (2013)
  - Total: 3
  - Density: 0.96/sq mi (0.37/km^{2})
- Time zone: UTC+1 (CET)
  - Summer (DST): UTC+2 (CEST)

Komanje Brdo is a village in the municipality of Stolac, Bosnia and Herzegovina.

== Demographics ==
According to the 2013 census, its population was 3, all Croats.
