= Poprati =

- Village
- Location within Bosnia and Herzegovina
- Coordinates: 43.09801°N 17.9080696°E
- Country: Bosnia and Herzegovina
- Entity: Federation of Bosnia and Herzegovina
- Canton: Herzegovina-Neretva
- Municipality: Stolac

Area
  - Total: 1.22 sq mi (3.17 km^{2})

Population (2013)
  - Total: 250
  - Density: 200/sq mi (79/km^{2})
- Time zone: UTC+1 (CET)
  - Summer (DST): UTC+2 (CEST)

Poprati is a village in the municipality of Stolac, Bosnia and Herzegovina.

== Demographics ==
According to the 2013 census, its population was 250.

Ethnicity in 2013
Ethnicity	Number	Percentage
Croats	193	77.2%
Bosniaks	47	18.8%
Serbs	8	3.2%
other/undeclared	2	0.8%
Total	250	100%
