= Brnjići =

- Village
- Location within Bosnia and Herzegovina
- Coordinates: 44.3723705°N 17.4019054°E
- Country: Bosnia and Herzegovina
- Entity: Federation of Bosnia and Herzegovina
- Canton: Central Bosnia
- Municipality: Dobretići

Area
  - Total: 0.44 sq mi (1.15 km^{2})

Population (2013)
  - Total: 43
  - Density: 97/sq mi (37/km^{2})
- Time zone: UTC+1 (CET)
  - Summer (DST): UTC+2 (CEST)

Brnjići is a village in the municipality of Dobretići, Central Bosnia Canton, Bosnia and Herzegovina.

== Demographics ==
According to the 2013 census, its population was 43, all Croats.
