= Bugojčići =

- Village
- Location within Bosnia and Herzegovina
- Coordinates: 44.1450327°N 17.6648727°E
- Country: Bosnia and Herzegovina
- Entity: Federation of Bosnia and Herzegovina
- Canton: Central Bosnia
- Municipality: Novi Travnik

Area
  - Total: 1.21 sq mi (3.14 km^{2})

Population (2013)
  - Total: 141
  - Density: 116/sq mi (44.9/km^{2})
- Time zone: UTC+1 (CET)
  - Summer (DST): UTC+2 (CEST)

Bugojčići is a village in the municipality of Novi Travnik, Bosnia and Herzegovina.

== Demographics ==
According to the 2013 census, its population was 141.

Ethnicity in 2013
Ethnicity	Number	Percentage
Bosniaks	129	91.5%
Croats	12	8.5%
Total	141	100%
