= Brankovac =

- Village
- Location within Bosnia and Herzegovina
- Coordinates: 44.2176037°N 17.7317019°E
- Country: Bosnia and Herzegovina
- Entity: Federation of Bosnia and Herzegovina
- Canton: Central Bosnia
- Municipality: Travnik

Area
  - Total: 0.42 sq mi (1.09 km^{2})

Population (2013)
  - Total: 255
  - Density: 606/sq mi (234/km^{2})
- Time zone: UTC+1 (CET)
  - Summer (DST): UTC+2 (CEST)

Brankovac is a village in the municipality of Travnik, Bosnia and Herzegovina.

== Demographics ==
According to the 2013 census, its population was 255.

Ethnicity in 2013
Ethnicity	Number	Percentage
Croats	159	62.4%
Bosniaks	95	37.3%
other/undeclared	1	0.4%
Total	255	100%
