= Pješivac-Kula =

- Village
- Location within Bosnia and Herzegovina
- Coordinates: 43.1092536°N 17.8756999°E
- Country: Bosnia and Herzegovina
- Entity: Federation of Bosnia and Herzegovina
- Canton: Herzegovina-Neretva
- Municipality: Stolac

Area
  - Total: 3.42 sq mi (8.86 km^{2})

Population (2013)
  - Total: 744
  - Density: 217/sq mi (84.0/km^{2})
- Time zone: UTC+1 (CET)
  - Summer (DST): UTC+2 (CEST)

Pješivac-Kula is a village in the municipality of Stolac, Bosnia and Herzegovina.

== Demographics ==
According to the 2013 census, its population was 744.

Ethnicity in 2013
| Ethnicity | Number | Percentage |
|---|---|---|
| Croats | 408 | 54.8% |
| Bosniaks | 334 | 44.9% |
| Serbs | 2 | 0.3% |
| Total | 744 | 100% |
