= Bosanski Osredci =

Bosanski Osredci Босански Осредци
- Village
- Location within Bosnia and Herzegovina
- Coordinates: 44°23′N 16°09′E
- Country: Bosnia and Herzegovina
- Entity: Federation of Bosnia and Herzegovina
- Canton: Una-Sana
- Municipality: Bihać

Area
  - Total: 5.22 sq mi (13.52 km^{2})

Population (2013)
  - Total: 18
  - Density: 3.4/sq mi (1.3/km^{2})
- Time zone: UTC+1 (CET)
  - Summer (DST): UTC+2 (CEST)

Bosanski Osredci (Serbian Cyrillic: Босански Осредци) is a village in the municipality of Bihać, Bosnia and Herzegovina.

== Demographics ==
According to the 2013 census, its population was 18, all Serbs.
