= Biličić =

- Village
- Location within Bosnia and Herzegovina
- Coordinates: 44°05′N 16°50′E
- Country: Bosnia and Herzegovina
- Entity: Federation of Bosnia and Herzegovina
- Canton: Canton 10
- Municipality: Glamoč

Area
  - Total: 6.04 km^{2} (2.33 sq mi)

Population (2013)
  - Total: 84
  - Density: 14/km^{2} (36/sq mi)
- Time zone: UTC+1 (CET)
  - Summer (DST): UTC+2 (CEST)

Biličić is a village in the Municipality of Glamoč in Canton 10 of the Federation of Bosnia and Herzegovina, an entity of Bosnia and Herzegovina.

== Demographics ==
According to the 2013 census, its population was 84.

Ethnicity in 2013
Ethnicity	Number	Percentage
Bosniaks	81	96.4%
Serbs	1	1.2%
Croats	1	1.2%
other/undeclared	1	1.2%
Total	84	100%

== Bibliography ==
- Ethnicity/National Affiliation, Religion and Mother Tongue (PDF). Sarajevo: Agency for Statistics of Bosnia and Herzegovina. 2019. Archived from the original (PDF) on 2020-07-25.
