= Budušići =

- Village
- Location within Bosnia and Herzegovina
- Coordinates: 44.1817839°N 17.6594045°E
- Country: Bosnia and Herzegovina
- Entity: Federation of Bosnia and Herzegovina
- Canton: Central Bosnia
- Municipality: Novi Travnik

Area
  - Total: 0.60 sq mi (1.55 km^{2})

Population (2013)
  - Total: 204
  - Density: 341/sq mi (132/km^{2})
- Time zone: UTC+1 (CET)
  - Summer (DST): UTC+2 (CEST)

Budušići is a village in the municipality of Novi Travnik, Bosnia and Herzegovina.

== Demographics ==
According to the 2013 census, its population was 204.

Ethnicity in 2013
Ethnicity	Number	Percentage
Croats	187	91.7%
Bosniaks	11	5.4%
Serbs	3	1.5%
other/undeclared	3	1.5%
Total	204	100%
