= Pijesci =

- Village
- Location within Bosnia and Herzegovina
- Coordinates: 43.1916254°N 17.7934312°E
- Country: Bosnia and Herzegovina
- Entity: Federation of Bosnia and Herzegovina
- Canton: Herzegovina-Neretva
- Municipality: City of Mostar

Area
  - Total: 3.78 sq mi (9.79 km^{2})

Population (2013)
  - Total: 233
  - Density: 61.6/sq mi (23.8/km^{2})
- Time zone: UTC+1 (CET)
  - Summer (DST): UTC+2 (CEST)

Pijesci is a village in the City of Mostar, Bosnia and Herzegovina.

== Demographics ==
According to the 2013 census, its population was 233.

Ethnicity in 2013
Ethnicity	Number	Percentage
Bosniaks	179	76.8%
Serbs	51	21.9%
other/undeclared	3	1.3%
Total	233	100%
