= Boboljusci =

Boboljusci Бобољусци
- Village
- Location within Bosnia and Herzegovina
- Coordinates: 44°26′15″N 16°15′04″E
- Country: Bosnia and Herzegovina
- Entity: Federation of Bosnia and Herzegovina
- Canton: Una-Sana
- Municipality: Bihać

Area
  - Total: 11.94 sq mi (30.92 km^{2})

Population (2013)
  - Total: 53
  - Density: 4.4/sq mi (1.7/km^{2})
- Time zone: UTC+1 (CET)
  - Summer (DST): UTC+2 (CEST)

Boboljusci (Serbian Cyrillic: Бобољусци) is a village in the municipality of Bihać, Bosnia and Herzegovina.

== Demographics ==
According to the 2013 census, its population was 53, all Serbs.
