= Pješivac-Greda =

- Village
- Location within Bosnia and Herzegovina
- Coordinates: 43.1223463°N 17.8860622°E
- Country: Bosnia and Herzegovina
- Entity: Federation of Bosnia and Herzegovina
- Canton: Herzegovina-Neretva
- Municipality: Stolac

Area
  - Total: 2.15 sq mi (5.57 km^{2})

Population (2013)
  - Total: 417
  - Density: 194/sq mi (74.9/km^{2})
- Time zone: UTC+1 (CET)
  - Summer (DST): UTC+2 (CEST)

Pješivac-Greda is a village in the municipality of Stolac, Bosnia and Herzegovina.

== Demographics ==
According to the 2013 census, its population was 417.

Ethnicity in 2013
Ethnicity	Number	Percentage
Croats	284	68.1%
Bosniaks	133	31.9%
Total	417	100%
