= Kanlići =

Coordinates: 43°42′29″N 19°04′59″E

Kanlići Канлићи
- Village
- Interactive map of Kanlići
- Country: Bosnia and Herzegovina
- Entity: Republika Srpska
- Municipality: Novo Goražde
- Time zone: UTC+1 (CET)
  - Summer (DST): UTC+2 (CEST)

Kanlići (Cyrillic: Канлићи) is a village in the municipality of Novo Goražde, Republika Srpska, Bosnia and Herzegovina.
