= Bosnian-Podrinje Canton Goražde =

Canton of the Federation of Bosnia and Herzegovina

Bosnian-Podrinje Canton Goražde Bosansko-podrinjski kanton Goražde (bs & sr) Bosansko-podrinjska županija Goražde (hr) Босанско-подрињски кантон Горажде (bs & sr)
- Canton
- Flag Coat of arms

- Location of the Bosnian-Podrinje Canton Goražde
- Coordinates: 43°40′N 18°59′E
- Country: Bosnia and Herzegovina
- Entity: Federation of Bosnia and Herzegovina
- Established: 1996
- Main city: Goražde
- Municipalities: List: Goražde Foča Pale

Government
  - Prime Minister: Senad Čeljo (NiP)
  - President of Assembly: Muradif Kanlić (SBB)

Area
  - Total: 504.6 km^{2} (194.8 sq mi)
  - Land: 504.5 km^{2} (194.8 sq mi)
  - Water: 0.0179 km^{2} (0.0069 sq mi)

Population (2013 census)
  - Total: 25,336
  - Density: 50.21/km^{2} (130.0/sq mi)
- Postal code: 73000
- Area code: 038
- ISO 3166 code: BA-05
- HDI (2023): 0.806 very high · (2nd)
- Website: http://www.bpkg.gov.ba/

The Bosnian-Podrinje Canton Goražde (Bosnian: Bosansko-podrinjski kanton Goražde; Croatian: Bosansko-podrinjska županija Goražde; Serbian: Босанско-подрињски кантон Горажде), until 2001 Goražde-Podrinje Canton (Bosnian: Goraždansko-podrinjski kanton; Croatian: Bosansko-podrinjska županija; Serbian: Горажданско-подрињски кантон) is a federated state and one of ten cantons of the Federation of Bosnia and Herzegovina, an entity in Bosnia and Herzegovina.

== Demographics ==
=== 2013 Census ===
| Municipality | Nationality | | | | | | Total |
| Municipality | Bosniaks | % | Croats | % | Serbs | % | Total |
|---|---|---|---|---|---|---|---|
| Goražde | 19,692 | 94.23 | 23 | 0.11 | 707 | 3.38 | 20,897 |
| Pale (FBiH) | 859 | 95.02 | 1 | 0.11 | 33 | 3.65 | 904 |
| Foča (FBiH) | 1,762 | 91.15 | 0 | 0 | 145 | 7.50 | 1,933 |
| Canton | 22,313 | 94.01 | 24 | 0.10 | 885 | 3.72 | 23,734 |

== Geography ==
It is located in the south-eastern central part of the country, in the region of Upper Drina. The cantonal seat is in Goražde.

== Municipalities ==
The canton is consisted of the municipalities of Goražde, where the seat of the canton is located, Foča (area of the municipality located in FBiH) with its municipal seat in Ustikolina and Pale (area of the municipality located in FBiH) with its municipal seat in Prača.

== See also ==
- Drina Banovina
- Podrinje
- List of heads of the Bosnian-Podrinje Canton Goražde
