= Blace (disambiguation) =

Blace may refer to:

Bosnia and Herzegovina

- Blace, Konjic, a village
- Blace, Prozor, a village
- Blace (Višegrad), a village

Croatia

- Blace, Croatia, a village near Opuzen

France

- Blacé, a commune of the Rhône department

Kosovo

- Bllacë, a village near Suva Reka

North Macedonia

- Blace, Čučer-Sandevo, a village
- Blace, Brvenica, a village

Serbia

- Blace, Serbia, a town and municipality in the Toplica district
