= Orašac =

Orašac may refer to:

- Orašac, Bihać, a village in Bosnia and Herzegovina
- Orašac, Novi Travnik, a village in Bosnia and Herzegovina
- Orašac, Prozor, a village in Bosnia and Herzegovina
- Orašac, Croatia, a village in southern Croatia
- Orašac, Kumanovo, a village in North Macedonia
- Orašac (Aranđelovac), a village in Serbia
- Orašac (Leskovac), a village in Serbia
- Orašac (Obrenovac), a village in Serbia
- Orašac (Prijepolje), a village in Serbia
- Orašac (Šabac), a village in Serbia
