= Rama (Neretva) =

Rama Рама
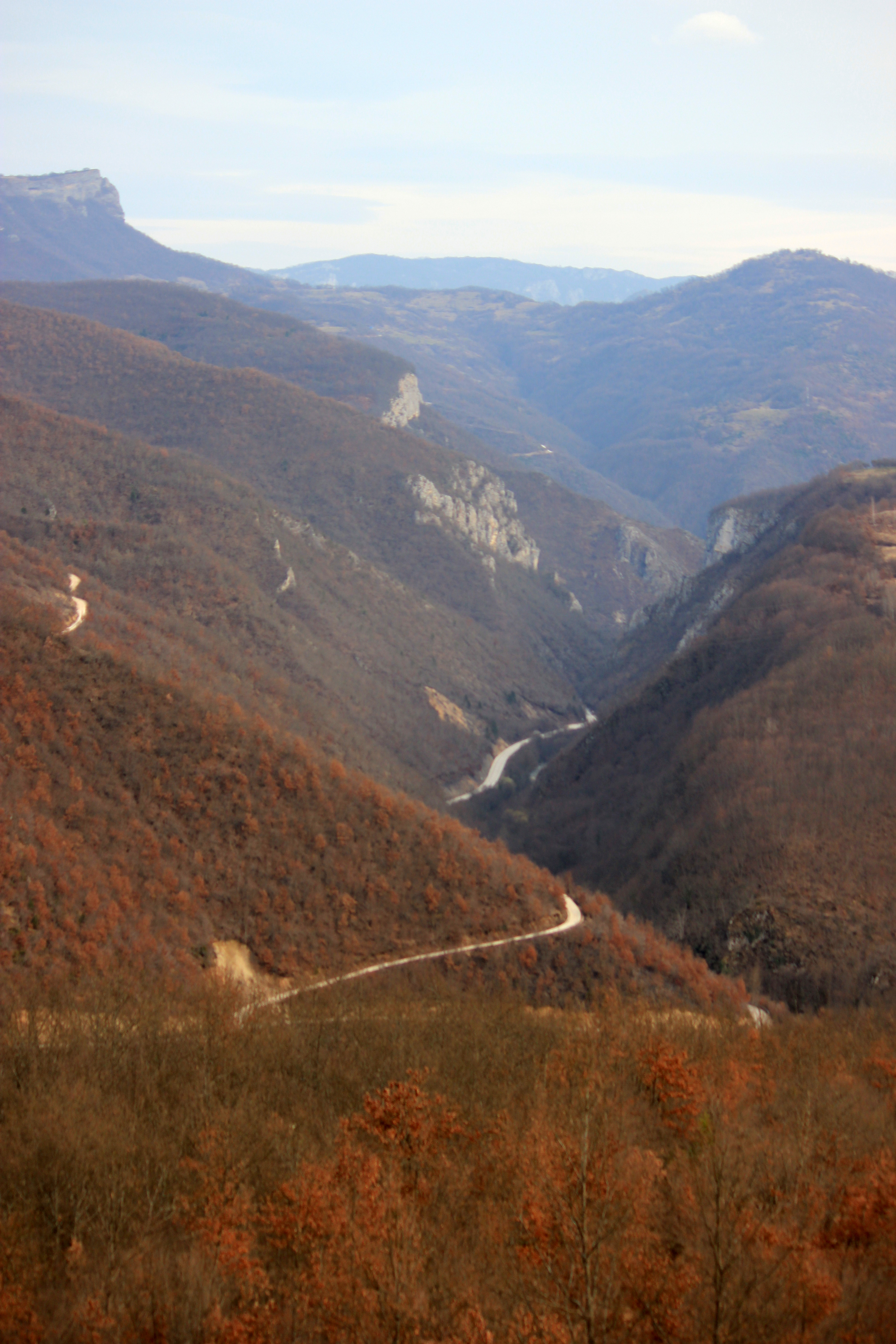

- Location of mouth

Location
- Country: Bosnia and Herzegovina
- Municipality: Prozor-Rama, Jablanica

Physical characteristics
- Source: Ramasko Ljetno i Zimsko Vrelo (Rama's Summer & Winter Spring)
  - coordinates: 43°49′03″N 17°29′07″E
  - elevation: cca. 595 m (1,952 ft)
- 2nd source: Buk
  - elevation: cca. 595 m (1,952 ft)
- 3rd source: Krupič
  - elevation: cca. 595 m (1,952 ft)
- Mouth: Jablaničko lake, Neretva
  - location: Marina Pećina near Gračac
  - coordinates: 43°43′44″N 17°41′17″E
- Length: 34 km (21 mi)

Basin features
- Progression: Neretva→ Adriatic Sea
- Landmarks: Rama Hydroelectric Power Station
- Tributaries
  - left: Brodac, Slatina, Sopot, Dušćica
  - right: Klenjak, Tornjaci, Tršćanski Creek,
- Waterbodies: Ramsko Lake, Jablaničko lake
- Waterfalls: Marina Pećina

The Rama is a river in Bosnia and Herzegovina, and a major tributary of the Neretva. It joins it from the right by discharging into Neretva's artificial reservoir, Jablaničko lake, at place called Marina Pećina, near village of Gračac, between location of underground powerhouse of Rama Hydroelectric Power Station and Jablanica Dam, depending on water level in Jablaničko lake, some 15 kilometers upstream from Jablanica.

The Rama flows through municipalities of Prozor-Rama and Jablanica, Bosnia and Herzegovina, while its headwaters together with wellsprings in the region of Gornja Rama, in Rama valley, are completely submerged under the reservoir Ramsko Lake.

The Rama springs out from large karst wellsprings called Ramsko Ljetno i Zimsko Vrelo (Rama's Summer & Winter Spring - depending on the season and amount of waters from snow melting), while couple of other large karst wellsprings also contribute a majority of rivers waters. In what's now completely submerged Rama valley, in the region of Gornja Rama, the wellsprings of Ramsko Ljetno (Zimsko) (gives around 6% of waters, depending on season and its hydrological condition), Krupić (gives between 40 and 47% of waters, depending on season and its hydrological condition) and Buk (gives between 26 and 41%, depending on season and its hydrological condition) being three largest are situated between villages of Rumboci, Varvara, and Kopčići and distributed around western-southwestern edge of the valley (since 1968 submerged by Ramsko Lake). Numerous smaller ones, such as Tornjaci, Močila and Klenjak in Kovačevo Polje, also contribute to the river volume in its uppermost headwaters.

== See also ==
- Prozor-Rama
- Ramsko Lake
- Rama Hydroelectric Power Station
