= Ploča =

Ploča, which translates as "Plate" from Serbo-Croatian, may refer to:

- Ploče, a town in Croatia
- Ploča (mountain), a mountain on the border of Albania and the Republic of Macedonia
- Ploča (Aleksandrovac), a village in Serbia
- Ploča (Bosilegrad), a village in Serbia
- Ploča (Gornji Vakuf), a village in Bosnia and Herzegovina
- Ploča, Prozor, a village in Bosnia and Herzegovina
- Ploča (Loznica), a village in Serbia
- Cape Planka (also known as Ploča), a cape in Croatia
- Ploča, Zadar, a part of the city of Zadar, Croatia
