= Borovnica =

Borovnica, which translates as Blueberry from Serbo-Croatian, may refer to:

- Borovnica, Prozor, a village in Bosnia and Herzegovina
- Borovnica, Zavidovići, a village in Bosnia and Herzegovina
- Borovnica, Slovenia
- Municipality of Borovnica
