= Podbor, Prozor =

Podbor
- Village
- Location within Bosnia and Herzegovina
- Coordinates: 43.815954°N 17.5455632°E
- Country: Bosnia and Herzegovina
- Entity: Federation of Bosnia and Herzegovina
- Canton: Herzegovina-Neretva
- Municipality: Prozor

Area
  - Total: 2.10 sq mi (5.43 km^{2})

Population (2013)
  - Total: 442
  - Density: 211/sq mi (81.4/km^{2})
- Time zone: UTC+1 (CET)
  - Summer (DST): UTC+2 (CEST)

Podbor is a village in the municipality of Prozor-Rama, Bosnia and Herzegovina. It is located on the eastern shores of Ramsko Lake.

== Demographics ==
According to the 2013 census, its population was 442.

Ethnicity in 2013
Ethnicity	Number	Percentage
Croats	436	98.6%
Bosniaks	6	1.4%
Total	442	100%
