= Rama Hydroelectric Power Station =

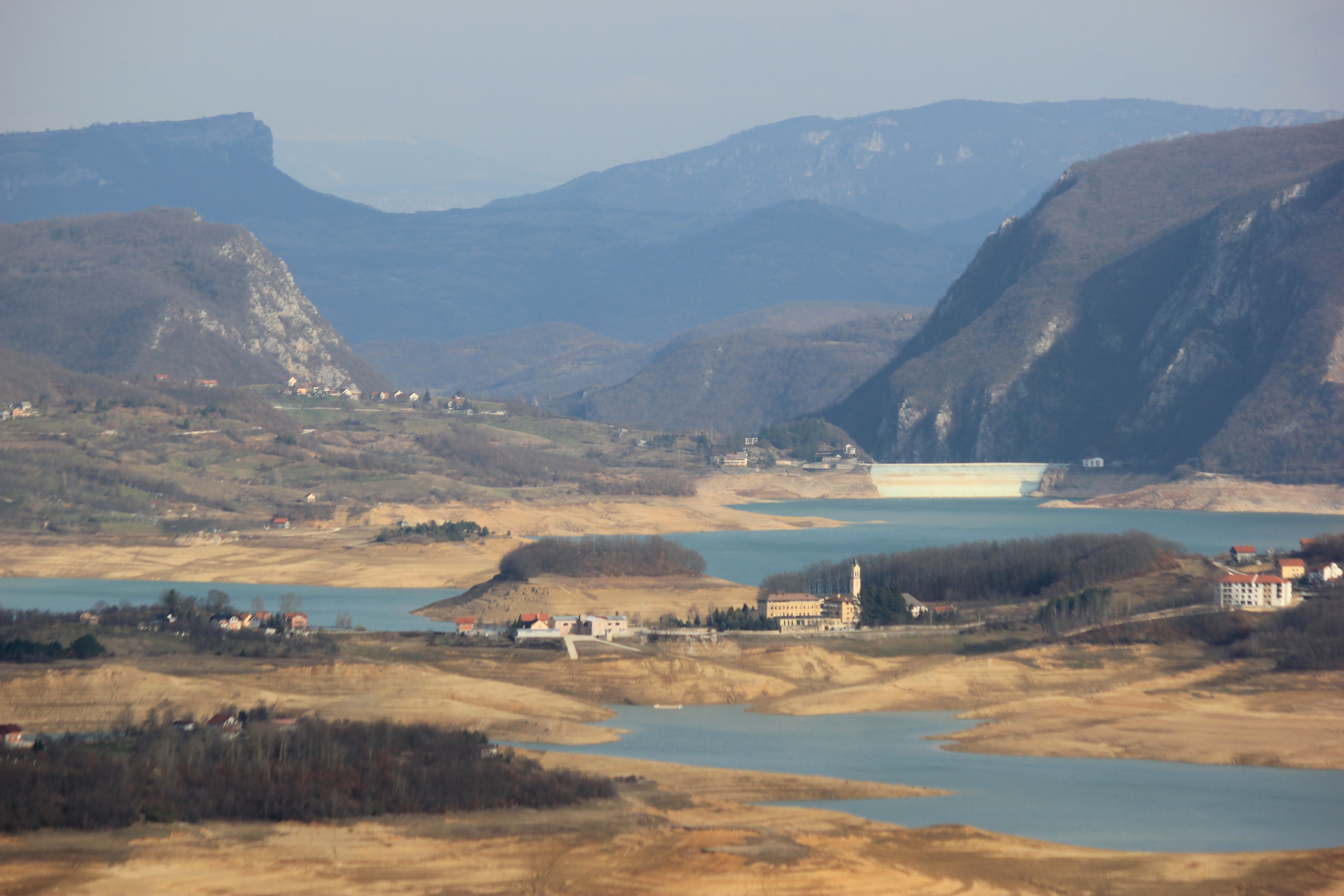
- Rama dam visible across the Ramsko lake, in a distance

- Location within Bosnia and Herzegovina
- Interactive map of Rama Hydroelectric Power Station
- Country: Bosnia and Herzegovina
- Location: Prozor-Rama
- Coordinates: 43.790560°N 17.571902°E
- Purpose: Power
- Status: Operational
- Construction began: 1964
- Opening date: 1968; 58 years ago
- Owner: Federation of Bosnia and Herzegovina entity government

Dam and spillways
- Type of dam: Embankment dam, concrete-face, rock-fill
- Impounds: Rama
- Height: 103 m (338 ft)
- Length: 230 m (750 ft)
- Elevation at crest: 598 m (1,962 ft)
- Dam volume: 1,450,000 m^{3} (1,900,000 cu yd)
- Spillway capacity: 700 m^{3}/s (25,000 cu ft/s)

Reservoir
- Creates: Ramsko lake
- Total capacity: 515,000,000 m^{3} (418,000 acre⋅ft)
- Active capacity: 466,000,000 m^{3} (378,000 acre⋅ft)
- Catchment area: 550 km^{2} (210 mi^{2})
- Surface area: 14.74 km^{2} (5.69 mi^{2})
- Normal elevation: 595 m (1,952 ft)

Rama Hydroelectric Power Station
- Coordinates: 43.746810°N 17.676043°E
- Operator: JP Elektroprivreda HZ HB d.d.
- Commission date: 1968
- Type: Conventional, diversion (run-of-the-river)
- Hydraulic head: 325 m (1,066 ft)
- Turbines: 2 x 80 MW Francis-type
- Installed capacity: 160 MW
- Annual generation: 650 GWh

The Rama Dam is a concrete-face rock-fill dam on the Rama river, a tributary of the Neretva river, about 4 km (2.5 mi) southwest of the town of Prozor in the Herzegovina-Neretva Canton of Bosnia and Herzegovina.

Dam and its hydropower plant are operated by Elektroprivreda HZ HB, public power utility company in Bosnia and Herzegovina owned by Federation of Bosnia and Herzegovina entity government.

== Characteristics ==
The dam was constructed between 1964 and 1968 with the primary purpose of hydroelectric power production. It is 103 m (338 ft) tall and creates Rama Lake. The dam's power station is located underground about 9.7 km (6.0 mi) to the southeast and discharges back into the Rama River. It contains two 80 MW Francis turbine-generators for an installed capacity of 160 MW. The difference in elevation between the reservoir and power station afford a hydraulic head (water drop) of 325 m (1,066 ft).

== History ==
The power station ceased operations between 1993 and 1996 due to the Bosnian War.

== See also ==
- List of power stations in Bosnia-Herzegovina
