= Varvara, Prozor =

Varvara
- Village
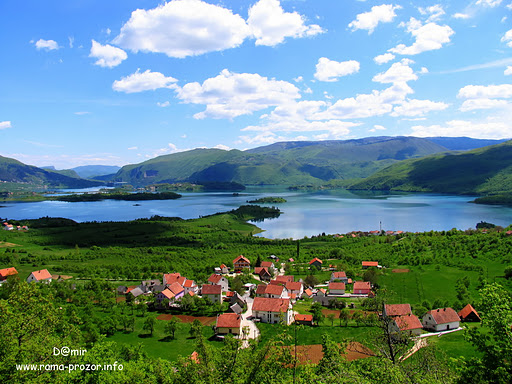

- Location within Bosnia and Herzegovina
- Coordinates: 43.8224379°N 17.4841439°E
- Country: Bosnia and Herzegovina
- Entity: Federation of Bosnia and Herzegovina
- Canton: Herzegovina-Neretva
- Municipality: Prozor

Area
  - Total: 11.06 sq mi (28.64 km^{2})

Population (2013)
  - Total: 452
  - Density: 40.9/sq mi (15.8/km^{2})
- Time zone: UTC+1 (CET)
  - Summer (DST): UTC+2 (CEST)

Varvara is a village in the municipality of Prozor-Rama, Bosnia and Herzegovina. It is located on the northwestern shore of Ramsko Lake.

== Demographics ==
According to the 2013 census, its population was 452.

Ethnicity in 2013
Ethnicity	Number	Percentage
Croats	266	58.8%
Bosniaks	186	41.2%
Total	452	100%
