= Heljdovi =

- Village
- Location within Bosnia and Herzegovina
- Coordinates: 43.7490407°N 17.6773878°E
- Country: Bosnia and Herzegovina
- Entity: Federation of Bosnia and Herzegovina
- Canton: Herzegovina-Neretva
- Municipality: Prozor

Area
  - Total: 1.54 sq mi (3.99 km^{2})

Population (2013)
  - Total: 40
  - Density: 26/sq mi (10/km^{2})
- Time zone: UTC+1 (CET)
  - Summer (DST): UTC+2 (CEST)

Heljdovi is a village in the municipality of Prozor-Rama, Bosnia and Herzegovina.

== Demographics ==
According to the 2013 census, its population was 40.

Ethnicity in 2013
Ethnicity	Number	Percentage
Bosniaks	35	87.5%
Croats	5	12.5%
Total	40	100%
