= Gmići =

- Village
- Location within Bosnia and Herzegovina
- Coordinates: 43.8348363°N 17.5851217°E
- Country: Bosnia and Herzegovina
- Entity: Federation of Bosnia and Herzegovina
- Canton: Herzegovina-Neretva
- Municipality: Prozor

Area
  - Total: 1.35 sq mi (3.50 km^{2})

Population (2013)
  - Total: 910
  - Density: 670/sq mi (260/km^{2})
- Time zone: UTC+1 (CET)
  - Summer (DST): UTC+2 (CEST)

Gmići is a village in the municipality of Prozor-Rama, Bosnia and Herzegovina.

== Demographics ==
According to the 2013 census, its population was 910.

Ethnicity in 2013
Ethnicity	Number	Percentage
Croats	827	90.9%
Bosniaks	82	9.0%
other/undeclared	1	0.1%
Total	910	100%
