= Proslap =

- Village
- Location within Bosnia and Herzegovina
- Coordinates: 43.7839448°N 17.5284154°E
- Country: Bosnia and Herzegovina
- Entity: Federation of Bosnia and Herzegovina
- Canton: Herzegovina-Neretva
- Municipality: Prozor

Area
  - Total: 11.97 sq mi (31.00 km^{2})

Population (2013)
  - Total: 166
  - Density: 13.9/sq mi (5.35/km^{2})
- Time zone: UTC+1 (CET)
  - Summer (DST): UTC+2 (CEST)

Proslap is a village in the municipality of Prozor-Rama, Bosnia and Herzegovina.

== Demographics ==
According to the 2013 census, its population was 166.

Ethnicity in 2013
Ethnicity	Number	Percentage
Croats	165	99.4%
Bosniaks	1	0.6%
Total	166	100%
