= Šerovina =

- Village
- Location within Bosnia and Herzegovina
- Coordinates: 43.7659278°N 17.6070008°E
- Country: Bosnia and Herzegovina
- Entity: Federation of Bosnia and Herzegovina
- Canton: Herzegovina-Neretva
- Municipality: Prozor

Area
  - Total: 3.17 sq mi (8.20 km^{2})

Population (2013)
  - Total: 0
  - Density: 0.0/sq mi (0.0/km^{2})
- Time zone: UTC+1 (CET)
  - Summer (DST): UTC+2 (CEST)

Šerovina is a village in the municipality of Prozor-Rama, Bosnia and Herzegovina.

== Demographics ==
According to the 2013 census, its population was nil, down from 52 in 1991.
