= Ljubunci =

- Village
- Location within Bosnia and Herzegovina
- Coordinates: 43.8350858°N 17.659678°E
- Country: Bosnia and Herzegovina
- Entity: Federation of Bosnia and Herzegovina
- Canton: Herzegovina-Neretva
- Municipality: Prozor

Area
  - Total: 2.92 sq mi (7.55 km^{2})

Population (2013)
  - Total: 233
  - Density: 79.9/sq mi (30.9/km^{2})
- Time zone: UTC+1 (CET)
  - Summer (DST): UTC+2 (CEST)

Ljubunci is a village in the municipality of Prozor-Rama, Bosnia and Herzegovina.

== Demographics ==
According to the 2013 census, its population was 233.

Ethnicity in 2013
Ethnicity	Number	Percentage
Croats	212	91.0%
Bosniaks	20	8.6%
other/undeclared	1	0.4%
Total	233	100%
