= Donja Vast =

- Village
- Location within Bosnia and Herzegovina
- Coordinates: 43.8276897°N 17.6484048°E
- Country: Bosnia and Herzegovina
- Entity: Federation of Bosnia and Herzegovina
- Canton: Herzegovina-Neretva
- Municipality: Prozor

Area
  - Total: 3.92 sq mi (10.15 km^{2})

Population (2013)
  - Total: 195
  - Density: 49.8/sq mi (19.2/km^{2})
- Time zone: UTC+1 (CET)
  - Summer (DST): UTC+2 (CEST)

Donja Vast is a village in the municipality of Prozor-Rama, Bosnia and Herzegovina.

== Demographics ==
According to the 2013 census, its population was 195.

Ethnicity in 2013
Ethnicity	Number	Percentage
Croats	164	84.1%
Bosniaks	30	15.4%
other/undeclared	1	0.5%
Total	195	100%
