= Gračac, Prozor =

Gračac
- Village
- Location within Bosnia and Herzegovina
- Coordinates: 43.7299199°N 17.6765444°E
- Country: Bosnia and Herzegovina
- Entity: Federation of Bosnia and Herzegovina
- Canton: Herzegovina-Neretva
- Municipality: Prozor

Area
  - Total: 0.72 sq mi (1.87 km^{2})

Population (2013)
  - Total: 427
  - Density: 591/sq mi (228/km^{2})
- Time zone: UTC+1 (CET)
  - Summer (DST): UTC+2 (CEST)

Gračac is a village in the municipality of Prozor-Rama, Bosnia and Herzegovina.

== Demographics ==
According to the 2013 census, its population was 427.

Ethnicity in 2013
Ethnicity	Number	Percentage
Croats	364	85.2%
Bosniaks	62	14.5%
other/undeclared	1	0.5%
Total	427	100%
