= Maglice =

Village in Bosnia and Herzegovina

- Village
- Location within Bosnia and Herzegovina
- Coordinates: 43.7707335°N 17.5379574°E
- Country: Bosnia and Herzegovina
- Entity: Federation of Bosnia and Herzegovina
- Canton: Herzegovina-Neretva
- Municipality: Prozor

Area
  - Total: 2.94 sq mi (7.61 km^{2})

Population (2013)
  - Total: 17
  - Density: 5.8/sq mi (2.2/km^{2})
- Time zone: UTC+1 (CET)
  - Summer (DST): UTC+2 (CEST)

Maglice is a village in the municipality of Prozor-Rama, Bosnia and Herzegovina.

== Demographics ==
According to the 2013 census, the population was 17, all Croats.
