= Kućani, Prozor =

Kućani
- Village
- Location within Bosnia and Herzegovina
- Coordinates: 43.7561418°N 17.7192003°E
- Country: Bosnia and Herzegovina
- Entity: Federation of Bosnia and Herzegovina
- Canton: Herzegovina-Neretva
- Municipality: Prozor

Area
  - Total: 3.68 sq mi (9.53 km^{2})

Population (2013)
  - Total: 77
  - Density: 21/sq mi (8.1/km^{2})
- Time zone: UTC+1 (CET)
  - Summer (DST): UTC+2 (CEST)

Kućani is a village in the municipality of Prozor-Rama, Bosnia and Herzegovina.

== Demographics ==
According to the 2013 census, its population was 77.

Ethnicity in 2013
Ethnicity	Number	Percentage
Croats	73	94.8%
Bosniaks	4	5.2%
Total	77	100%
