= Donji Višnjani =

- Village
- Location within Bosnia and Herzegovina
- Coordinates: 43.7797054°N 17.5878058°E
- Country: Bosnia and Herzegovina
- Entity: Federation of Bosnia and Herzegovina
- Canton: Herzegovina-Neretva
- Municipality: Prozor

Area
  - Total: 1.70 sq mi (4.40 km^{2})

Population (2013)
  - Total: 10
  - Density: 5.9/sq mi (2.3/km^{2})
- Time zone: UTC+1 (CET)
  - Summer (DST): UTC+2 (CEST)

Donji Višnjani is a village in the municipality of Prozor-Rama, Bosnia and Herzegovina.

== Demographics ==
According to the 2013 census, its population was 10.

Ethnicity in 2013
Ethnicity	Number	Percentage
Bosniaks	5	50.0%
Croats	5	50.0%
Total	86	100%
