= Ometala =

- Village
- Location within Bosnia and Herzegovina
- Coordinates: 43.8262874°N 17.5707825°E
- Country: Bosnia and Herzegovina
- Entity: Federation of Bosnia and Herzegovina
- Canton: Herzegovina-Neretva
- Municipality: Prozor

Area
  - Total: 1.20 sq mi (3.10 km^{2})

Population (2013)
  - Total: 401
  - Density: 335/sq mi (129/km^{2})
- Time zone: UTC+1 (CET)
  - Summer (DST): UTC+2 (CEST)

Ometala is a village in the municipality of Prozor-Rama, Bosnia and Herzegovina.

== Demographics ==
According to the 2013 census, its population was 401, all Croats.
