= Gornji Krančići =

- Village
- Location within Bosnia and Herzegovina
- Coordinates: 43.8004014°N 17.658478°E
- Country: Bosnia and Herzegovina
- Entity: Federation of Bosnia and Herzegovina
- Canton: Herzegovina-Neretva
- Municipality: Prozor

Area
  - Total: 0.91 sq mi (2.36 km^{2})

Population (2013)
  - Total: 81
  - Density: 89/sq mi (34/km^{2})
- Time zone: UTC+1 (CET)
  - Summer (DST): UTC+2 (CEST)

Gornji Krančići is a village in the municipality of Prozor-Rama, Bosnia and Herzegovina.

== Demographics ==
According to the 2013 census, its population was 81, all Croats.
