= Ustirama =

- Village
- Location within Bosnia and Herzegovina
- Coordinates: 43.7311079°N 17.7044727°E
- Country: Bosnia and Herzegovina
- Entity: Federation of Bosnia and Herzegovina
- Canton: Herzegovina-Neretva
- Municipality: Prozor

Area
  - Total: 3.31 sq mi (8.57 km^{2})

Population (2013)
  - Total: 377
  - Density: 114/sq mi (44.0/km^{2})
- Time zone: UTC+1 (CET)
  - Summer (DST): UTC+2 (CEST)

Ustirama is a village in the municipality of Prozor-Rama, Bosnia and Herzegovina.

== Demographics ==
According to the 2013 census, its population was 377.

Ethnicity in 2013
Ethnicity	Number	Percentage
Croats	371	98.4%
Bosniaks	6	1.6%
Total	377	100%
