= Donji Krančići =

- Village
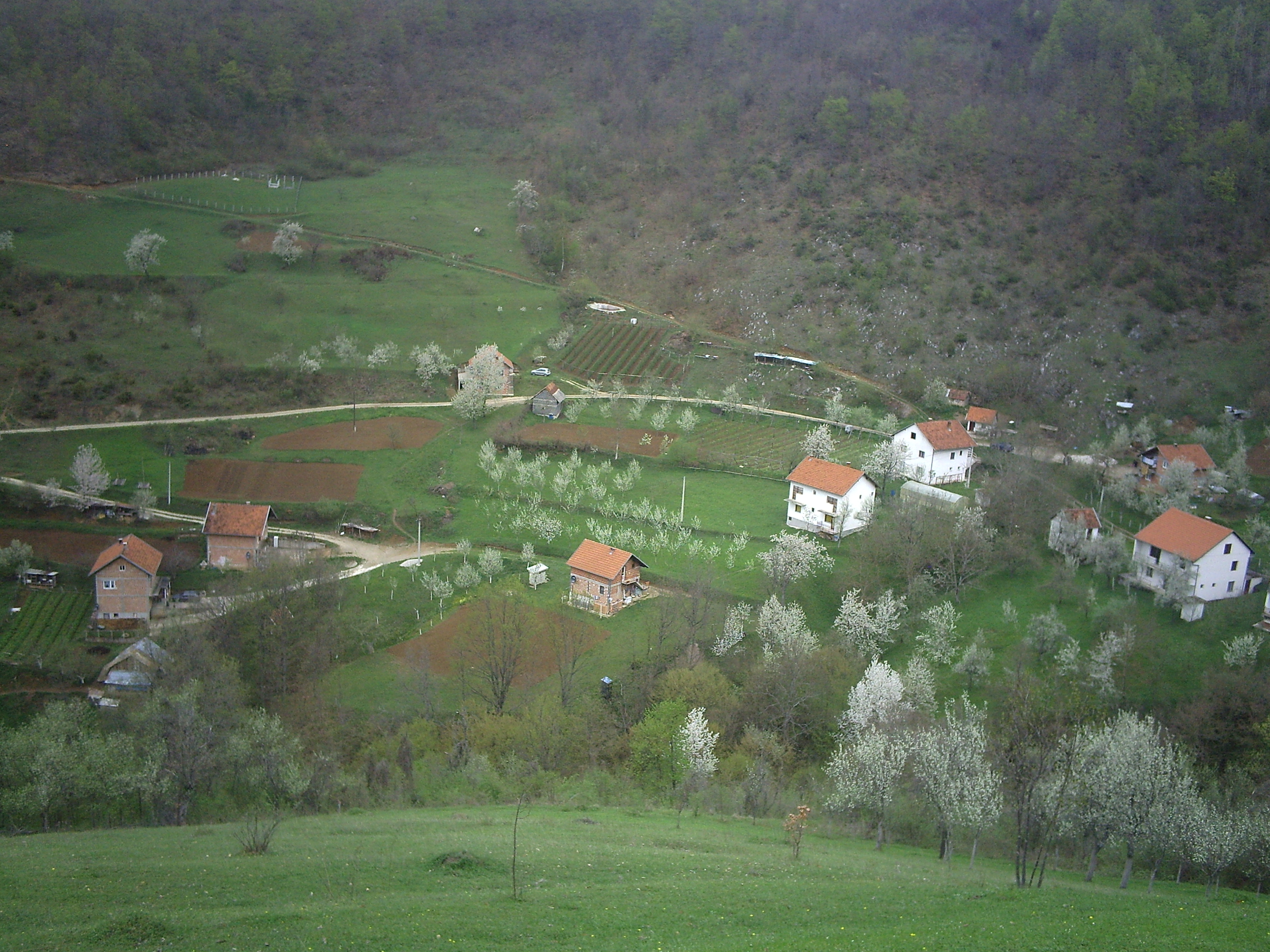

- Location within Bosnia and Herzegovina
- Coordinates: 43.7908239°N 17.6552757°E
- Country: Bosnia and Herzegovina
- Entity: Federation of Bosnia and Herzegovina
- Canton: Herzegovina-Neretva
- Municipality: Prozor

Area
  - Total: 1.34 sq mi (3.46 km^{2})

Population (2013)
  - Total: 50
  - Density: 37/sq mi (14/km^{2})
- Time zone: UTC+1 (CET)
  - Summer (DST): UTC+2 (CEST)

Donji Krančići is a village in the municipality of Prozor-Rama, Bosnia and Herzegovina.

== Demographics ==
According to the 2013 census, its population was 50.

Ethnicity in 2013
Ethnicity	Number	Percentage
Bosniaks	33	66.0%
Croats	17	34.0%
Total	50	100%
