= Kovačevo Polje =

- Village
- Location within Bosnia and Herzegovina
- Coordinates: 43.7863643°N 17.5530842°E
- Country: Bosnia and Herzegovina
- Entity: Federation of Bosnia and Herzegovina
- Canton: Herzegovina-Neretva
- Municipality: Prozor

Area
  - Total: 2.54 sq mi (6.58 km^{2})

Population (2013)
  - Total: 103
  - Density: 40.5/sq mi (15.7/km^{2})
- Time zone: UTC+1 (CET)
  - Summer (DST): UTC+2 (CEST)

Kovačevo Polje is a village in the municipality of Prozor-Rama, Bosnia and Herzegovina. It is located on the south shore of Ramsko Lake.

== Demographics ==
According to the 2013 census, its population was 103.

Ethnicity in 2013
Ethnicity	Number	Percentage
Bosniaks	92	89.3%
Croats	11	10.7%
Total	103	100%
