= Skrobućani =

- Village
- Location within Bosnia and Herzegovina
- Coordinates: 43.7708139°N 17.6321911°E
- Country: Bosnia and Herzegovina
- Entity: Federation of Bosnia and Herzegovina
- Canton: Herzegovina-Neretva
- Municipality: Prozor

Area
  - Total: 3.69 sq mi (9.57 km^{2})

Population (2013)
  - Total: 149
  - Density: 40.3/sq mi (15.6/km^{2})
- Time zone: UTC+1 (CET)
  - Summer (DST): UTC+2 (CEST)

Skrobućani is a village in the municipality of Prozor-Rama, Bosnia and Herzegovina.

== Demographics ==
According to the 2013 census, its population was 149.

Ethnicity in 2013
Ethnicity	Number	Percentage
Croats	90	60.4%
Bosniaks	59	39.6%
Total	149	100%
