= Tošćanica =

- Village
- Location within Bosnia and Herzegovina
- Coordinates: 43.7214062°N 17.7347349°E
- Country: Bosnia and Herzegovina
- Entity: Federation of Bosnia and Herzegovina
- Canton: Herzegovina-Neretva
- Municipality: Prozor - Rama

Area
  - Total: 2.52 sq mi (6.52 km^{2})

Population (2013)
  - Total: 124
  - Density: 49.3/sq mi (19.0/km^{2})
- Time zone: UTC+1 (CET)
  - Summer (DST): UTC+2 (CEST)

Tošćanica is a village in the municipality of Prozor-Rama, Bosnia and Herzegovina.

== Demographics ==
According to the 2013 census, its population was 124.

Ethnicity in 2013
Ethnicity	Number	Percentage
Bosniaks	119	96.0%
Croats	5	4.0%
Total	124	100%
