= Lapsunj =

- Village
- Location within Bosnia and Herzegovina
- Coordinates: 43.8368967°N 17.5555871°E
- Country: Bosnia and Herzegovina
- Entity: Federation of Bosnia and Herzegovina
- Canton: Herzegovina-Neretva
- Municipality: Prozor

Area
  - Total: 2.28 sq mi (5.91 km^{2})

Population (2013)
  - Total: 142
  - Density: 62.2/sq mi (24.0/km^{2})
- Time zone: UTC+1 (CET)
  - Summer (DST): UTC+2 (CEST)

Lapsunj is a village in the municipality of Prozor-Rama, Bosnia and Herzegovina.

== Demographics ==
According to the 2013 census, its population was 142.

Ethnicity in 2013
Ethnicity	Number	Percentage
Bosniaks	61	78.2%
Croats	25	21.8%
Total	142	100%
