= Zahum =

- Village
- Location within Bosnia and Herzegovina
- Coordinates: 43.8324388°N 17.4422209°E
- Country: Bosnia and Herzegovina
- Entity: Federation of Bosnia and Herzegovina
- Canton: Herzegovina-Neretva
- Municipality: Prozor

Area
  - Total: 17.95 sq mi (46.50 km^{2})

Population (2013)
  - Total: 61
  - Density: 3.4/sq mi (1.3/km^{2})
- Time zone: UTC+1 (CET)
  - Summer (DST): UTC+2 (CEST)

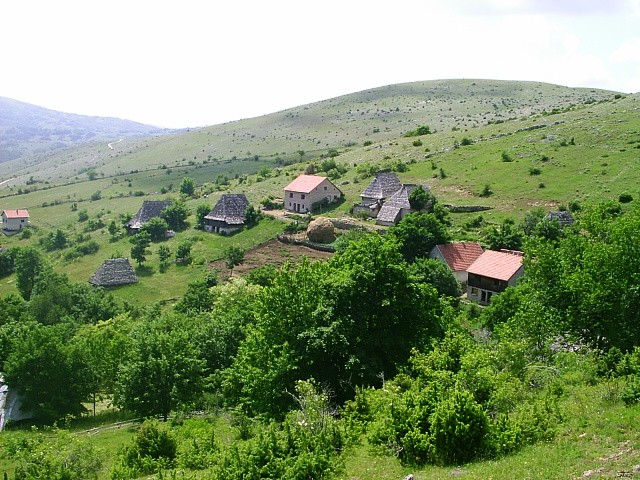
View of Zahum

Zahum is a village in the municipality of Prozor-Rama, Bosnia and Herzegovina.

== Demographics ==
According to the 2013 census, its population was 61, all Croats.
