= Šćipe =

- Village
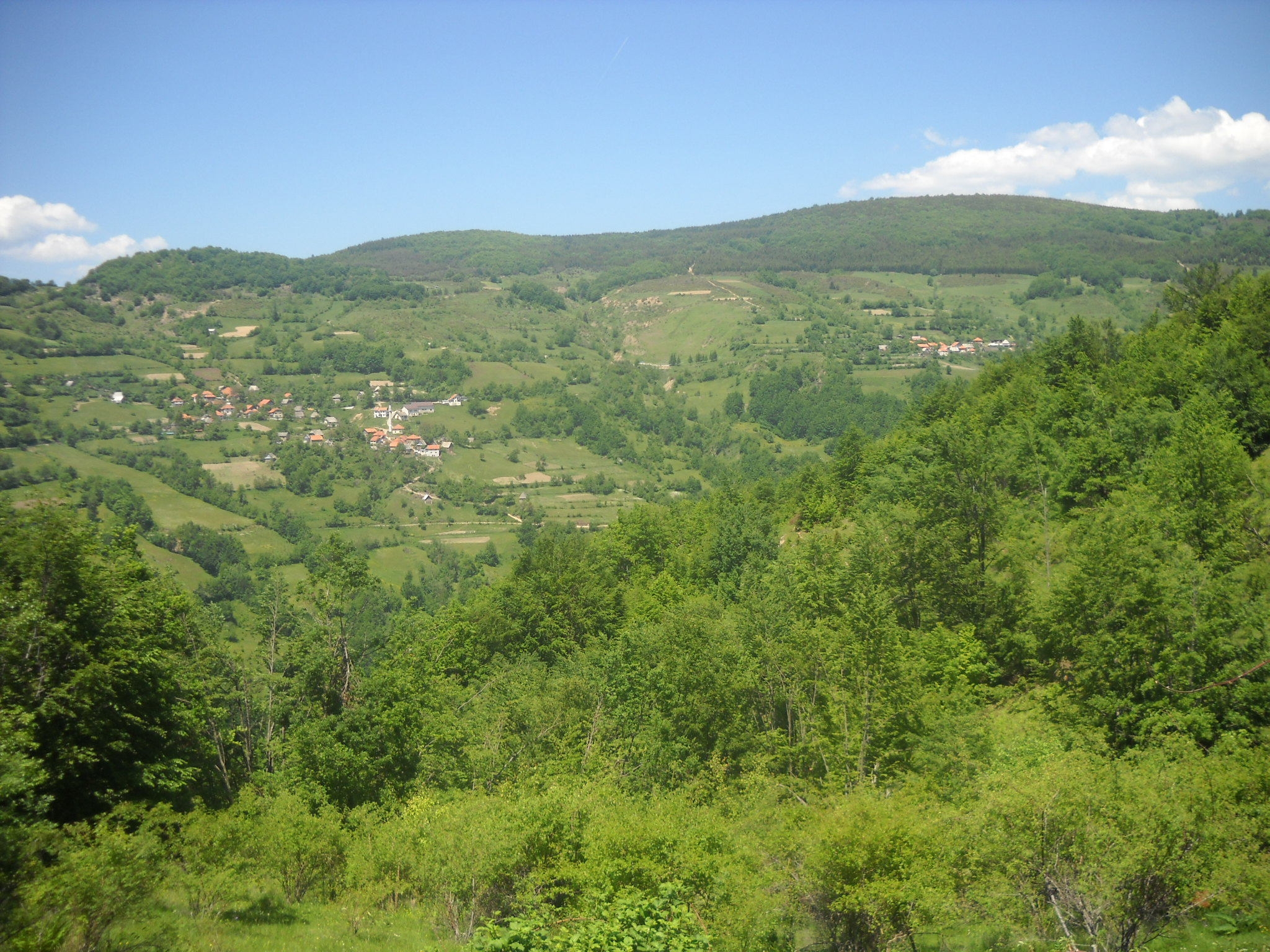

- Location within Bosnia and Herzegovina
- Coordinates: 43.8239929°N 17.7352906°E
- Country: Bosnia and Herzegovina
- Entity: Federation of Bosnia and Herzegovina
- Canton: Herzegovina-Neretva
- Municipality: Prozor

Area
  - Total: 7.46 sq mi (19.31 km^{2})

Population (2013)
  - Total: 195
  - Density: 26.2/sq mi (10.1/km^{2})
- Time zone: UTC+1 (CET)
  - Summer (DST): UTC+2 (CEST)

Šćipe is a village in the municipality of Prozor-Rama, Bosnia and Herzegovina.

== Demographics ==
According to the 2013 census, its population was 195, all Bosniaks.
