= Šlimac =

- Village
- Location within Bosnia and Herzegovina
- Coordinates: 43.8390753°N 17.5463317°E
- Country: Bosnia and Herzegovina
- Entity: Federation of Bosnia and Herzegovina
- Canton: Herzegovina-Neretva
- Municipality: Prozor

Area
  - Total: 1.78 sq mi (4.62 km^{2})

Population (2013)
  - Total: 88
  - Density: 49/sq mi (19/km^{2})
- Time zone: UTC+1 (CET)
  - Summer (DST): UTC+2 (CEST)

Šlimac is a village in the municipality of Prozor-Rama, Bosnia and Herzegovina.

== Demographics ==
According to the 2013 census, its population was 88.

Ethnicity in 2013
Ethnicity	Number	Percentage
Croats	58	65.9%
Bosniaks	30	34.1%
Total	88	100%
