= Gračanica, Prozor =

Gračanica
- Village
- Location within Bosnia and Herzegovina
- Coordinates: 43.8276897°N 17.6484048°E
- Country: Bosnia and Herzegovina
- Entity: Federation of Bosnia and Herzegovina
- Canton: Herzegovina-Neretva
- Municipality: Prozor

Area
  - Total: 0.34 sq mi (0.87 km^{2})

Population (2013)
  - Total: 89
  - Density: 260/sq mi (100/km^{2})
- Time zone: UTC+1 (CET)
  - Summer (DST): UTC+2 (CEST)

Gračanica is a village in the municipality of Prozor-Rama, Bosnia and Herzegovina.

== Demographics ==
According to the 2013 census, its population was 89.

Ethnicity in 2013
| Ethnicity | Number | Percentage |
|---|---|---|
| Bosniaks | 56 | 62.9% |
| Croats | 33 | 37.1% |
| Total | 89 | 100% |
