= Ripci =

- Village
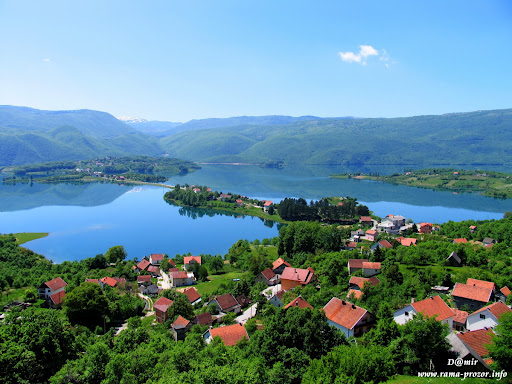

- Location within Bosnia and Herzegovina
- Coordinates: 43.818558°N 17.5262937°E
- Country: Bosnia and Herzegovina
- Entity: Federation of Bosnia and Herzegovina
- Canton: Herzegovina-Neretva
- Municipality: Prozor

Area
  - Total: 1.36 sq mi (3.53 km^{2})

Population (2013)
  - Total: 525
  - Density: 385/sq mi (149/km^{2})
- Time zone: UTC+1 (CET)
  - Summer (DST): UTC+2 (CEST)

Ripci is a village in the municipality of Prozor-Rama, Bosnia and Herzegovina.

== Demographics ==
According to the 2013 census, its population was 525.

Ethnicity in 2013
Ethnicity	Number	Percentage
Croats	517	98.5%
Bosniaks	5	1.0%
other/undeclared	3	0.6%
Total	525	100%
