= Kozo, Prozor =

Kozo
- Village
- Location within Bosnia and Herzegovina
- Coordinates: 43.7955154°N 17.4629383°E
- Country: Bosnia and Herzegovina
- Entity: Federation of Bosnia and Herzegovina
- Canton: Herzegovina-Neretva
- Municipality: Prozor

Area
  - Total: 10.11 sq mi (26.18 km^{2})

Population (2013)
  - Total: 53
  - Density: 5.2/sq mi (2.0/km^{2})
- Time zone: UTC+1 (CET)
  - Summer (DST): UTC+2 (CEST)

Kozo is a village in the municipality of Prozor-Rama, Bosnia and Herzegovina.

== Demographics ==
According to the 2013 census, its population was 53, all Croats.
