= Duge =

- Village
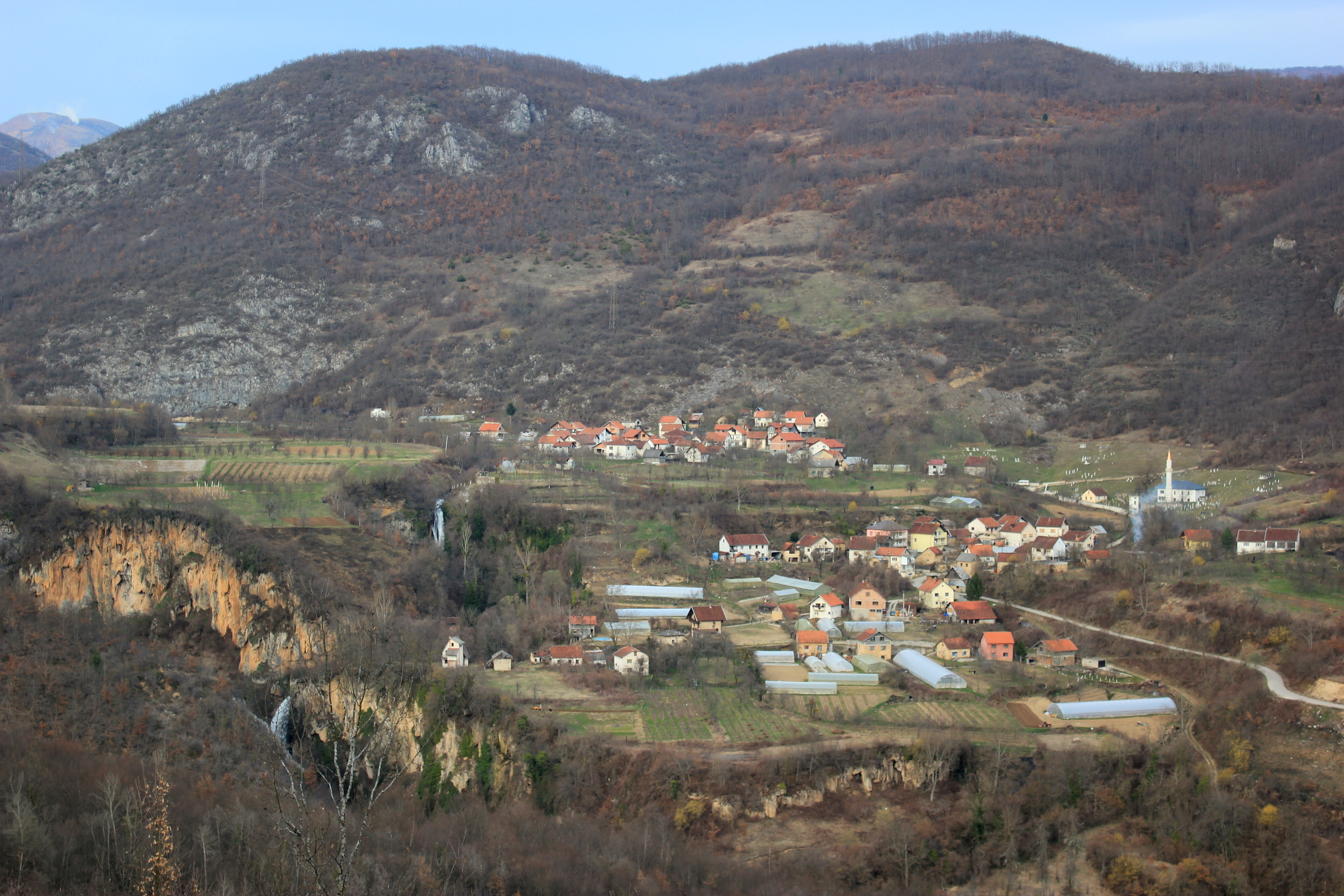

- Location within Bosnia and Herzegovina
- Coordinates: 43.8029569°N 17.6397706°E
- Country: Bosnia and Herzegovina
- Entity: Federation of Bosnia and Herzegovina
- Canton: Herzegovina-Neretva
- Municipality: Prozor

Area
  - Total: 2.93 sq mi (7.60 km^{2})

Population (2013)
  - Total: 218
  - Density: 74.3/sq mi (28.7/km^{2})
- Time zone: UTC+1 (CET)
  - Summer (DST): UTC+2 (CEST)

Duge is a village in the municipality of Prozor-Rama, Bosnia and Herzegovina.

== Demographics ==
According to the 2013 census, its population was 218.

Ethnicity in 2013
Ethnicity	Number	Percentage
Bosniaks	117	53.7%
Croats	100	45.9%
other/undeclared	1	0.5%
Total	218	100%
