= Gorica, Prozor =

Gorica
- Village
- Location within Bosnia and Herzegovina
- Coordinates: 43.7803864°N 17.6444886°E
- Country: Bosnia and Herzegovina
- Entity: Federation of Bosnia and Herzegovina
- Canton: Herzegovina-Neretva
- Municipality: Prozor

Area
  - Total: 2.68 sq mi (6.93 km^{2})

Population (2013)
  - Total: 56
  - Density: 21/sq mi (8.1/km^{2})
- Time zone: UTC+1 (CET)
  - Summer (DST): UTC+2 (CEST)

Gorica is a village in the municipality of Prozor-Rama, Bosnia and Herzegovina.

== Demographics ==
According to the 2013 census, its population was 56.

Ethnicity in 2013
Ethnicity	Number	Percentage
Bosniaks	30	53.6%
Croats	26	46.4%
Total	56	100%
