= Kute, Prozor =

Kute
- Village
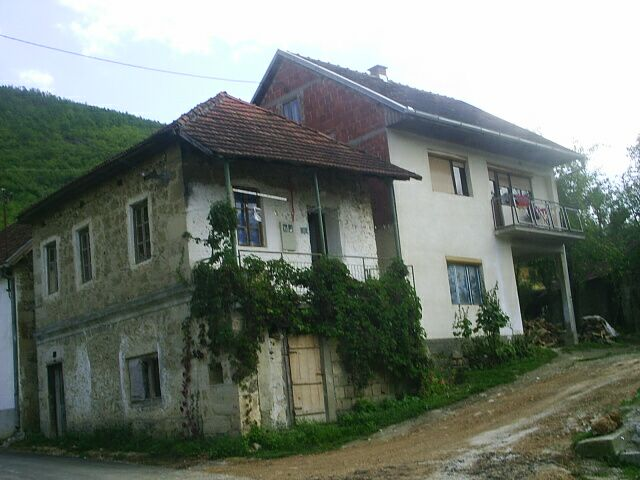

- Location within Bosnia and Herzegovina
- Coordinates: 43.81959°N 17.7153322°E
- Country: Bosnia and Herzegovina
- Entity: Federation of Bosnia and Herzegovina
- Canton: Herzegovina-Neretva
- Municipality: Prozor

Area
  - Total: 3.36 sq mi (8.71 km^{2})

Population (2013)
  - Total: 196
  - Density: 58.3/sq mi (22.5/km^{2})
- Time zone: UTC+1 (CET)
  - Summer (DST): UTC+2 (CEST)

Kute is a village in the municipality of Prozor-Rama, Bosnia and Herzegovina.

== Demographics ==
According to the 2013 census, its population was 196.

Ethnicity in 2013
Ethnicity	Number	Percentage
Bosniaks	195	99.5%
Croats	1	0.5%
Total	196	100%
