= Ravnica, Prozor =

Ravnica
- Village
- Location within Bosnia and Herzegovina
- Coordinates: 43.7380123°N 17.6576319°E
- Country: Bosnia and Herzegovina
- Entity: Federation of Bosnia and Herzegovina
- Canton: Herzegovina-Neretva
- Municipality: Prozor

Area
  - Total: 1.03 sq mi (2.67 km^{2})

Population (2013)
  - Total: 21
  - Density: 20/sq mi (7.9/km^{2})
- Time zone: UTC+1 (CET)
  - Summer (DST): UTC+2 (CEST)

Ravnica is a village in the municipality of Prozor-Rama, Bosnia and Herzegovina.

== Demographics ==
According to the 2013 census, its population was 21.

Ethnicity in 2013
Ethnicity	Number	Percentage
Croats	13	61.9%
Bosniaks	7	33.3%
other/undeclared	1	4.8%
Total	21	100%
