= Jaklići =

- Village
- Location within Bosnia and Herzegovina
- Coordinates: 43.8318675°N 17.5069448°E
- Country: Bosnia and Herzegovina
- Entity: Federation of Bosnia and Herzegovina
- Canton: Herzegovina-Neretva
- Municipality: Prozor

Area
  - Total: 4.50 sq mi (11.65 km^{2})

Population (2013)
  - Total: 607
  - Density: 135/sq mi (52.1/km^{2})
- Time zone: UTC+1 (CET)
  - Summer (DST): UTC+2 (CEST)

Jaklići is a village in the municipality of Prozor-Rama, Bosnia and Herzegovina.

== Demographics ==
According to the 2013 census, its population was 607.

Ethnicity in 2013
Ethnicity	Number	Percentage
Croats	606	99.8%
other/undeclared	1	0.2%
Total	607	100%
