= Družinovići =

- Village
- Location within Bosnia and Herzegovina
- Coordinates: 43.838037°N 17.5318772°E
- Country: Bosnia and Herzegovina
- Entity: Federation of Bosnia and Herzegovina
- Canton: Herzegovina-Neretva
- Municipality: Prozor

Area
  - Total: 2.44 sq mi (6.33 km^{2})

Population (2013)
  - Total: 158
  - Density: 64.6/sq mi (25.0/km^{2})
- Time zone: UTC+1 (CET)
  - Summer (DST): UTC+2 (CEST)

Družinovići is a village in the municipality of Prozor-Rama, Bosnia and Herzegovina.

== Demographics ==
According to the 2013 census, its population was 158.

Ethnicity in 2013
Ethnicity	Number	Percentage
Croats	116	73.4%
Bosniaks	42	26.6%
Total	158	100%
