= Mluša =

- Village
- Location within Bosnia and Herzegovina
- Coordinates: 43.7971248°N 17.5685514°E
- Country: Bosnia and Herzegovina
- Entity: Federation of Bosnia and Herzegovina
- Canton: Herzegovina-Neretva
- Municipality: Prozor

Area
  - Total: 1.10 sq mi (2.85 km^{2})

Population (2013)
  - Total: 170
  - Density: 150/sq mi (60/km^{2})
- Time zone: UTC+1 (CET)
  - Summer (DST): UTC+2 (CEST)

Mluša is a village in the municipality of Prozor-Rama, Bosnia and Herzegovina.

== Demographics ==
According to the 2013 census, its population was 170, all Croats.
