= Klek, Prozor =

Klek
- Village
- Location within Bosnia and Herzegovina
- Coordinates: 43.7651372°N 17.695226°E
- Country: Bosnia and Herzegovina
- Entity: Federation of Bosnia and Herzegovina
- Canton: Herzegovina-Neretva
- Municipality: Prozor

Area
  - Total: 2.17 sq mi (5.62 km^{2})

Population (2013)
  - Total: 80
  - Density: 37/sq mi (14/km^{2})
- Time zone: UTC+1 (CET)
  - Summer (DST): UTC+2 (CEST)

Klek is a village in the municipality of Prozor-Rama, Bosnia and Herzegovina.

== Demographics ==
According to the 2013 census, its population was 80, all Bosniaks.
