= Lug, Prozor =

Lug
- Village
- Location within Bosnia and Herzegovina
- Coordinates: 43.7901419°N 17.6276315°E
- Country: Bosnia and Herzegovina
- Entity: Federation of Bosnia and Herzegovina
- Canton: Herzegovina-Neretva
- Municipality: Prozor

Area
  - Total: 2.31 sq mi (5.98 km^{2})

Population (2013)
  - Total: 543
  - Density: 235/sq mi (90.8/km^{2})
- Time zone: UTC+1 (CET)
  - Summer (DST): UTC+2 (CEST)

Lug is a village in the municipality of Prozor-Rama, Bosnia and Herzegovina.

== Demographics ==
According to the 2013 census, its population was 543.

Ethnicity in 2013
| Ethnicity | Number | Percentage |
|---|---|---|
| Bosniaks | 272 | 50.1% |
| Croats | 266 | 49.0% |
| other/undeclared | 5 | 0.9% |
| Total | 543 | 100% |
