= Hudutsko =

- Village
- Location within Bosnia and Herzegovina
- Coordinates: 43.7042418°N 17.7351555°E
- Country: Bosnia and Herzegovina
- Entity: Federation of Bosnia and Herzegovina
- Canton: Herzegovina-Neretva
- Municipality: Prozor

Area
  - Total: 0.58 sq mi (1.51 km^{2})

Population (2013)
  - Total: 41
  - Density: 70/sq mi (27/km^{2})
- Time zone: UTC+1 (CET)
  - Summer (DST): UTC+2 (CEST)

Hudutsko is a village in the municipality of Prozor-Rama, Bosnia and Herzegovina.

== Demographics ==
According to the 2013 census, its population was 41, all Croats.
