= Parcani, Prozor =

Parcani
- Village
- Location within Bosnia and Herzegovina
- Coordinates: 43.7599862°N 17.6583792°E
- Country: Bosnia and Herzegovina
- Entity: Federation of Bosnia and Herzegovina
- Canton: Herzegovina-Neretva
- Municipality: Prozor

Area
  - Total: 1.48 sq mi (3.83 km^{2})

Population (2013)
  - Total: 17
  - Density: 11/sq mi (4.4/km^{2})
- Time zone: UTC+1 (CET)
  - Summer (DST): UTC+2 (CEST)

Parcani is a village in the municipality of Prozor-Rama, Bosnia and Herzegovina.

== Demographics ==
According to the 2013 census, its population was 17.

Ethnicity in 2013
Ethnicity	Number	Percentage
Bosniaks	16	94.1%
other/undeclared	1	5.9%
Total	86	100%
