= Trišćani =

- Village
- Location within Bosnia and Herzegovina
- Coordinates: 43.7277569°N 17.6565841°E
- Country: Bosnia and Herzegovina
- Entity: Federation of Bosnia and Herzegovina
- Canton: Herzegovina-Neretva
- Municipality: Prozor

Area
  - Total: 2.42 sq mi (6.27 km^{2})

Population (2013)
  - Total: 38
  - Density: 16/sq mi (6.1/km^{2})
- Time zone: UTC+1 (CET)
  - Summer (DST): UTC+2 (CEST)

Trišćani is a village in the municipality of Prozor-Rama, Bosnia and Herzegovina.

== Demographics ==
According to the 2013 census, its population was 38.

Ethnicity in 2013
Ethnicity	Number	Percentage
Croats	37	97.4%
other/undeclared	1	2.6%
Total	38	100%
