= Rumboci =

- Village
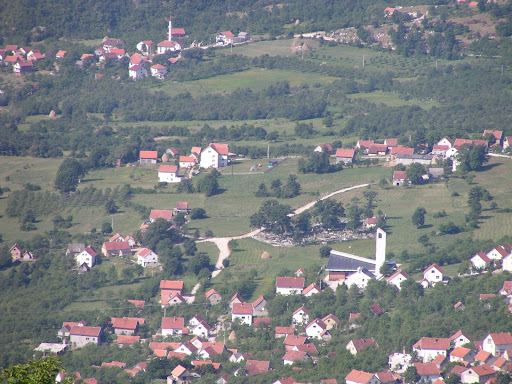

- Location within Bosnia and Herzegovina
- Coordinates: 43.8299208°N 17.495751°E
- Country: Bosnia and Herzegovina
- Entity: Federation of Bosnia and Herzegovina
- Canton: Herzegovina-Neretva
- Municipality: Prozor

Area
  - Total: 2.38 sq mi (6.16 km^{2})

Population (2013)
  - Total: 1,350
  - Density: 568/sq mi (219/km^{2})
- Time zone: UTC+1 (CET)
  - Summer (DST): UTC+2 (CEST)

Rumboci is a village in the municipality of Prozor-Rama, Bosnia and Herzegovina.

== Demographics ==
According to the 2013 census, its population was 1,350.

Ethnicity in 2013
Ethnicity	Number	Percentage
Croats	1,347	99.8%
other/undeclared	3	0.2%
Total	1,350	100%
