= Dobroša =

- Village
- Location within Bosnia and Herzegovina
- Coordinates: 43.8283007°N 17.6362417°E
- Country: Bosnia and Herzegovina
- Entity: Federation of Bosnia and Herzegovina
- Canton: Herzegovina-Neretva
- Municipality: Prozor

Area
  - Total: 1.92 sq mi (4.97 km^{2})

Population (2013)
  - Total: 64
  - Density: 33/sq mi (13/km^{2})
- Time zone: UTC+1 (CET)
  - Summer (DST): UTC+2 (CEST)

Dobroša is a village in the municipality of Prozor-Rama, Bosnia and Herzegovina.

== Demographics ==
According to the 2013 census, its population was 64, all Croats.
