= Blace (Višegrad) =

- Village
- Location within Bosnia and Herzegovina
- Coordinates: 43°53′12″N 19°13′27″E
- Country: Bosnia and Herzegovina
- Entity: Republika Srpska
- Municipality: Višegrad
- Time zone: UTC+1 (CET)
  - Summer (DST): UTC+2 (CEST)

Blace (Serbian: Блаце) is a village in the municipality of Višegrad, Bosnia and Herzegovina.
