= Borovnica, Prozor-Rama =

Borovnica
- Village
- Location within Bosnia and Herzegovina
- Coordinates: 43.810901°N 17.6001622°E
- Country: Bosnia and Herzegovina
- Entity: Federation of Bosnia and Herzegovina
- Canton: Herzegovina-Neretva
- Municipality: Prozor

Area
  - Total: 2.43 sq mi (6.29 km^{2})

Population (2013)
  - Total: 223
  - Density: 91.8/sq mi (35.5/km^{2})
- Time zone: UTC+1 (CET)
  - Summer (DST): UTC+2 (CEST)

Borovnica is a village in the municipality of Prozor-Rama, Bosnia and Herzegovina.

== Demographics ==
According to the 2013 census, its population was 223.

Ethnicity in 2013
Ethnicity	Number	Percentage
Croats	128	57.4%
Bosniaks	95	42.6%
Total	223	100%
