= Orašac (Leskovac) =

Orašac Орашац
- Village
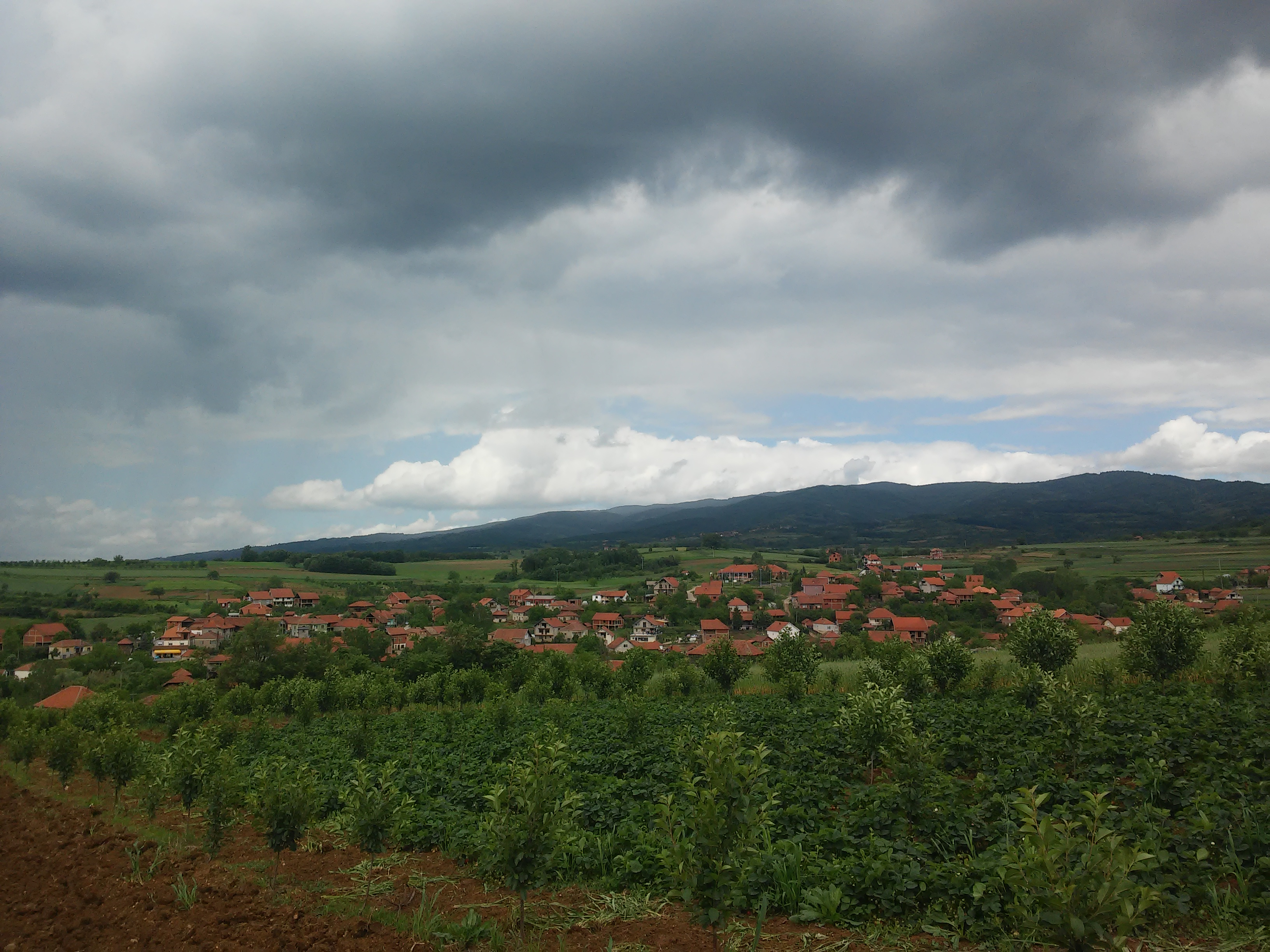
- Panorama of the village.

- Location within Serbia
- Coordinates: 43°03′18″N 22°03′58″E
- Country: Serbia
- District: Jablanica District
- Municipality: Leskovac

Population (2002)
  - Total: 582
- Time zone: UTC+1 (CET)
  - Summer (DST): UTC+2 (CEST)

Orašac is a village in the municipality of Leskovac, Serbia. According to the 2002 census, the village has a population of 582 people.

== Gallery ==
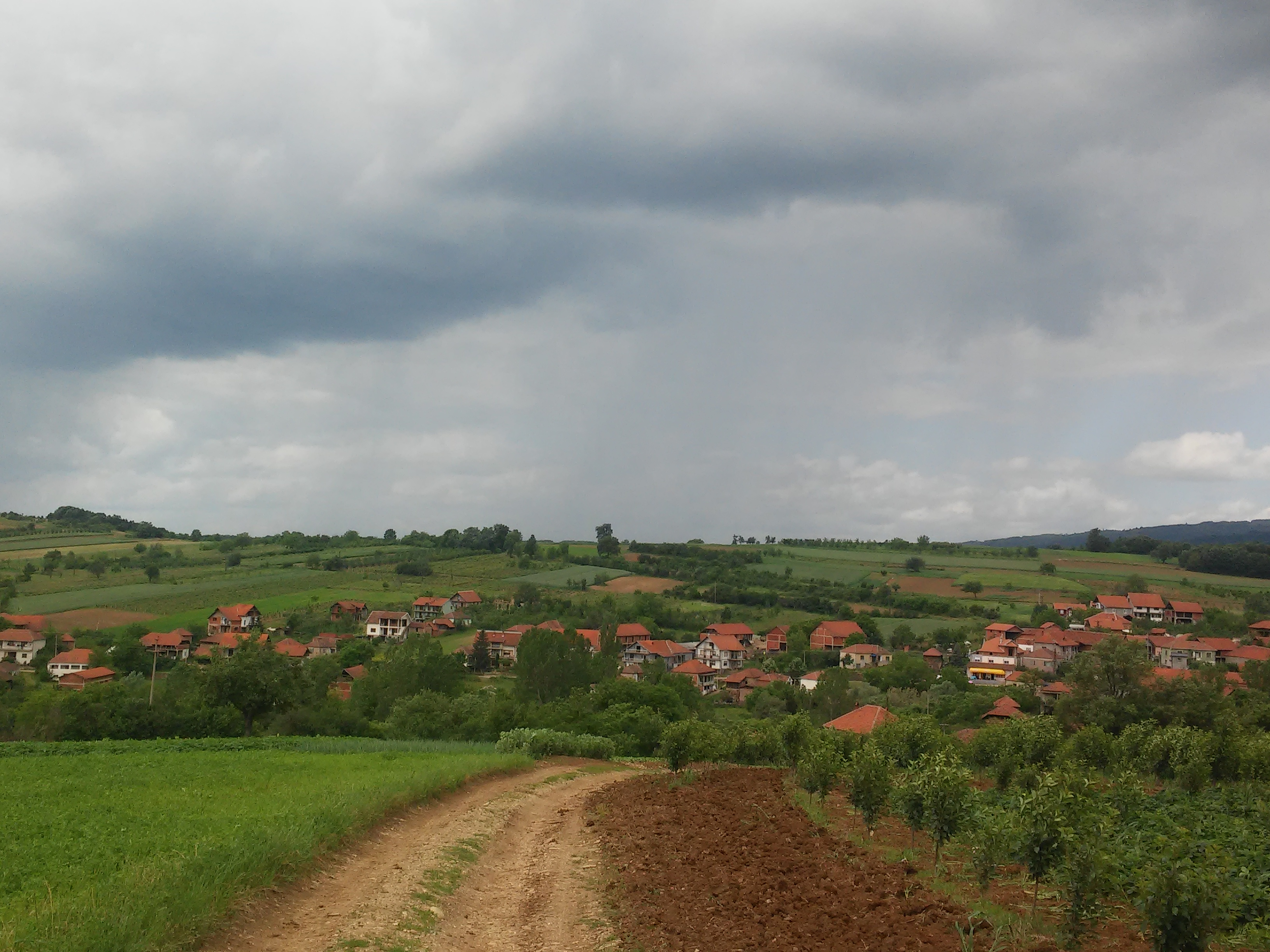
Panorama of the village.

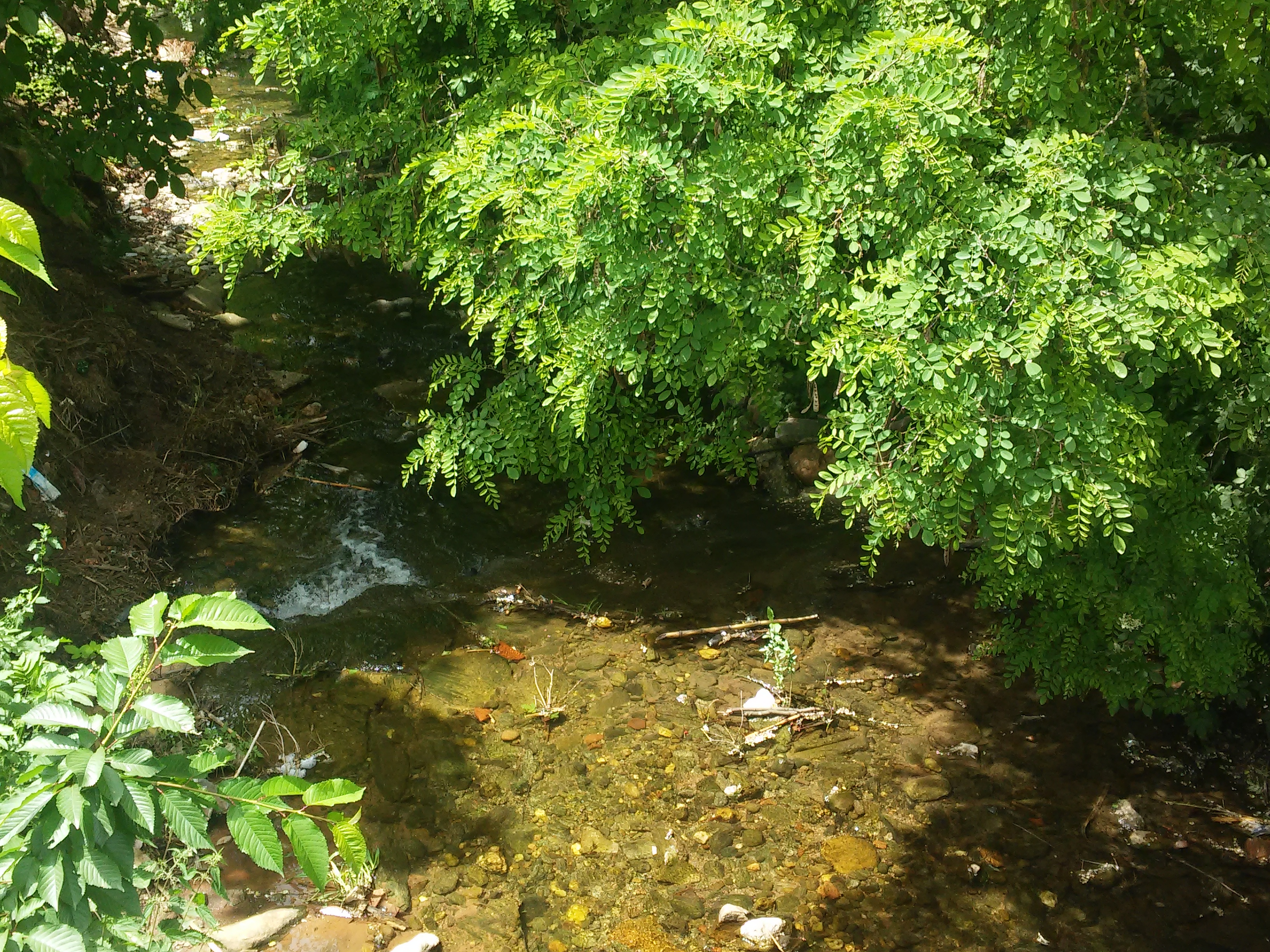
A stream in the village.

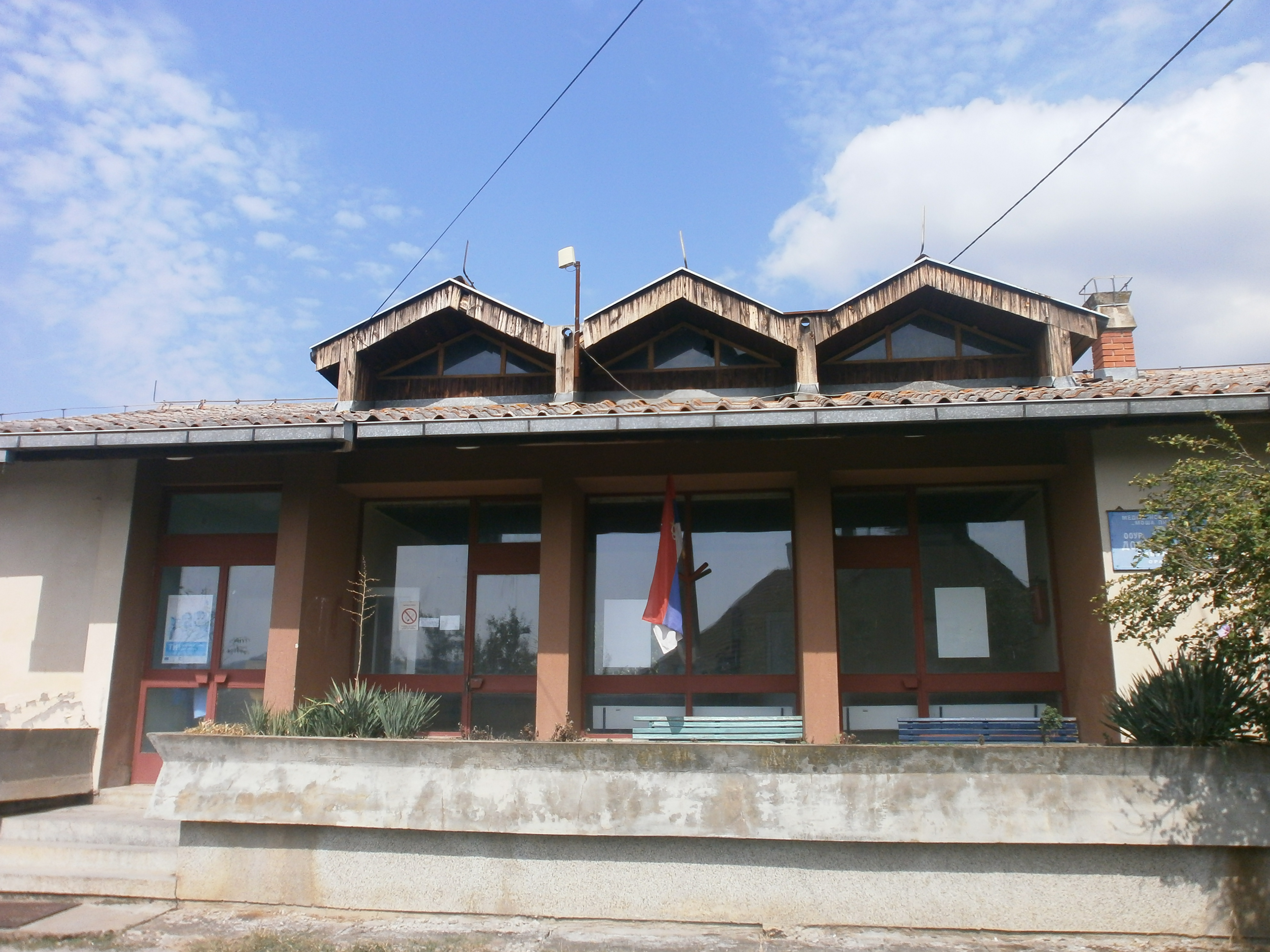
Clinic for out-patients.

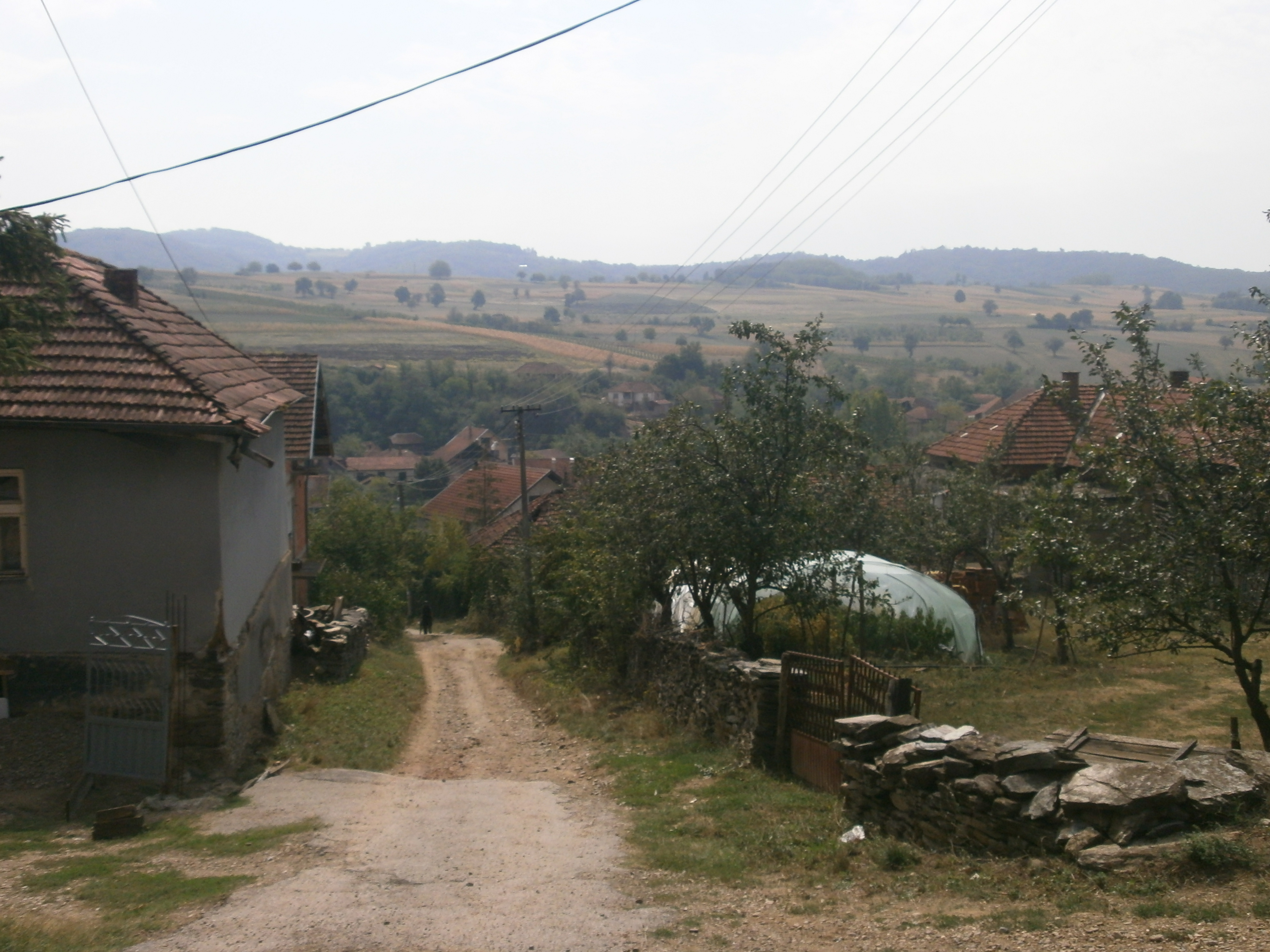
A street in the village.

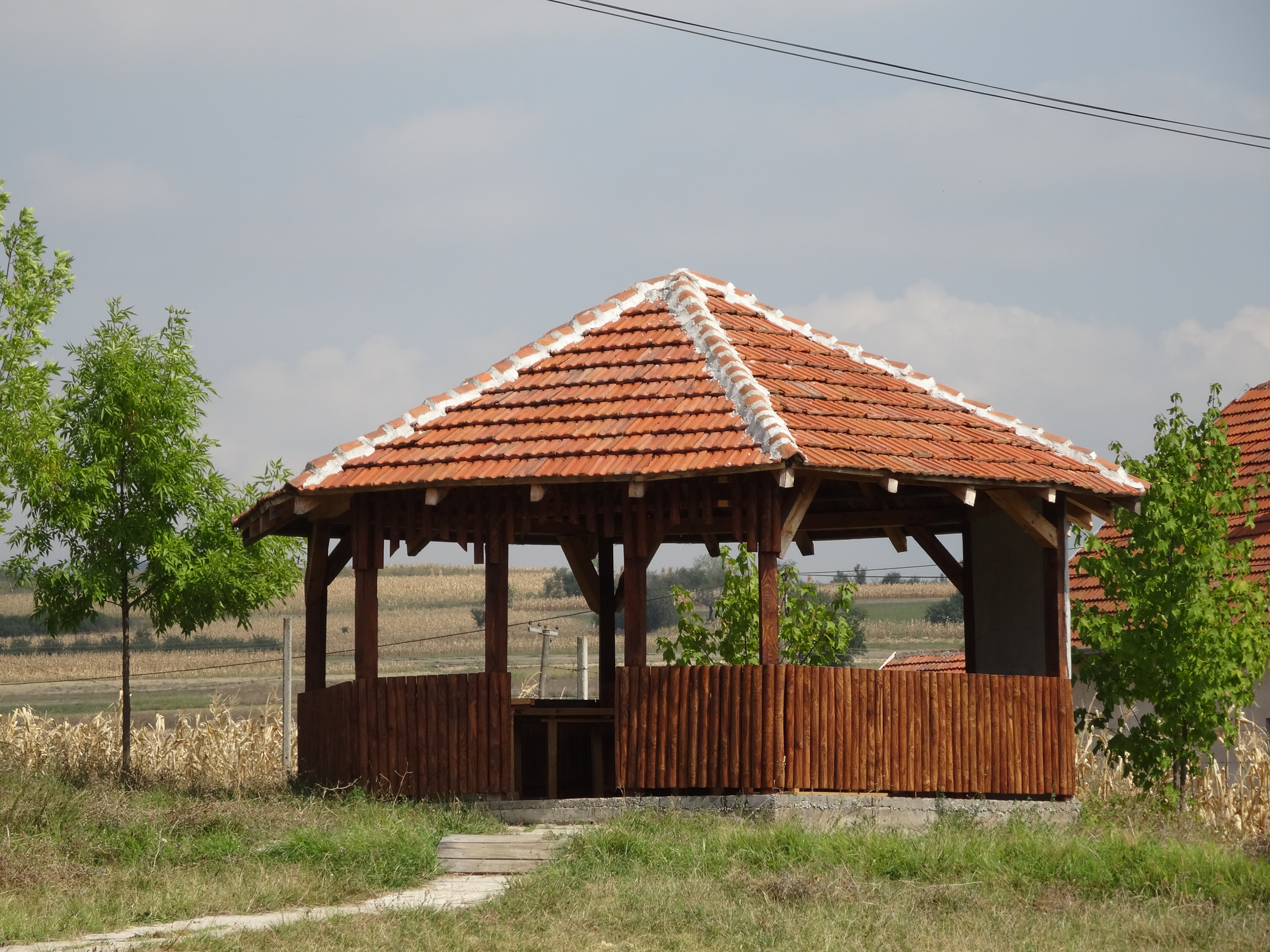
A primary schoolyard.

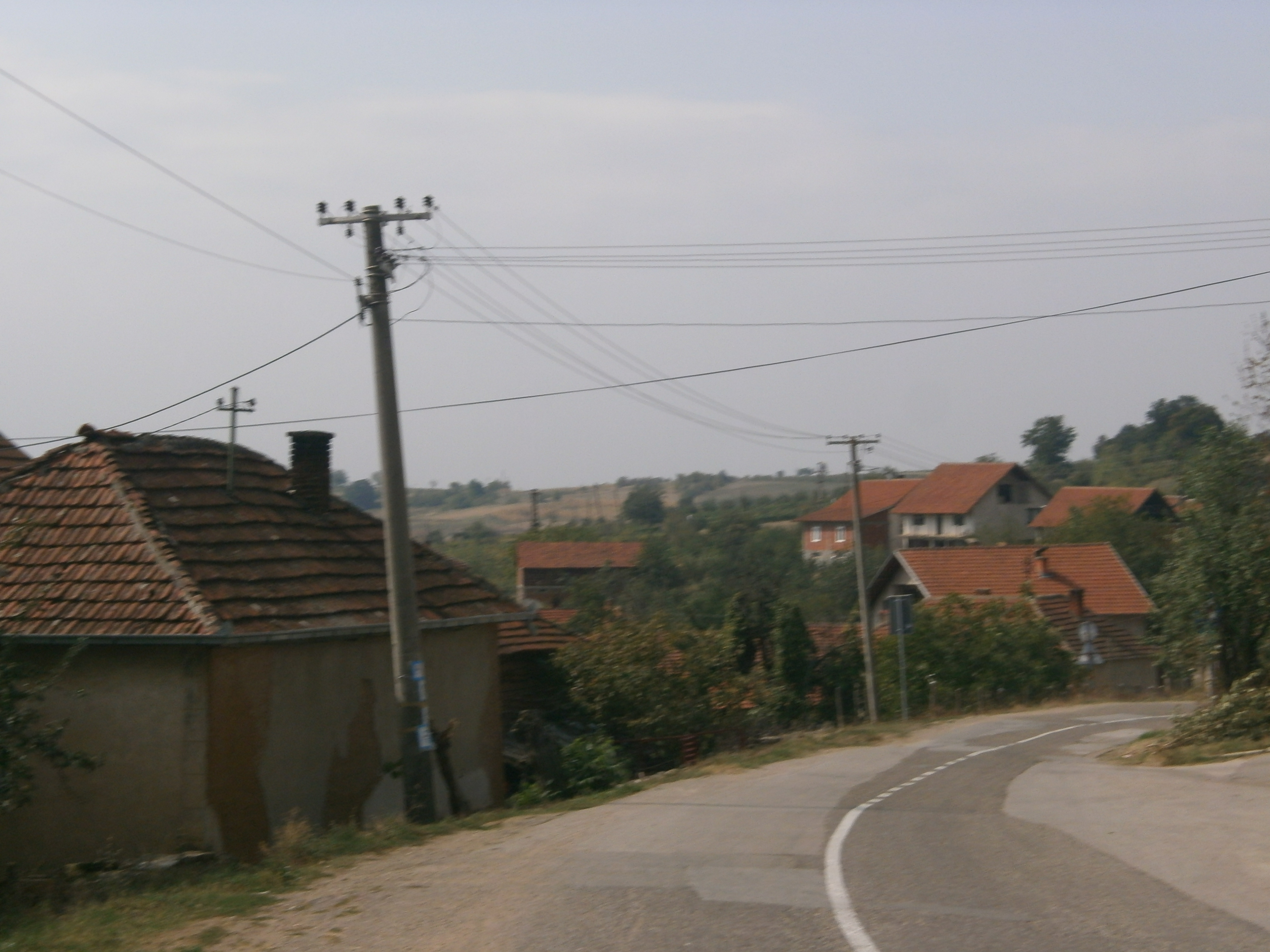
A street in the village.

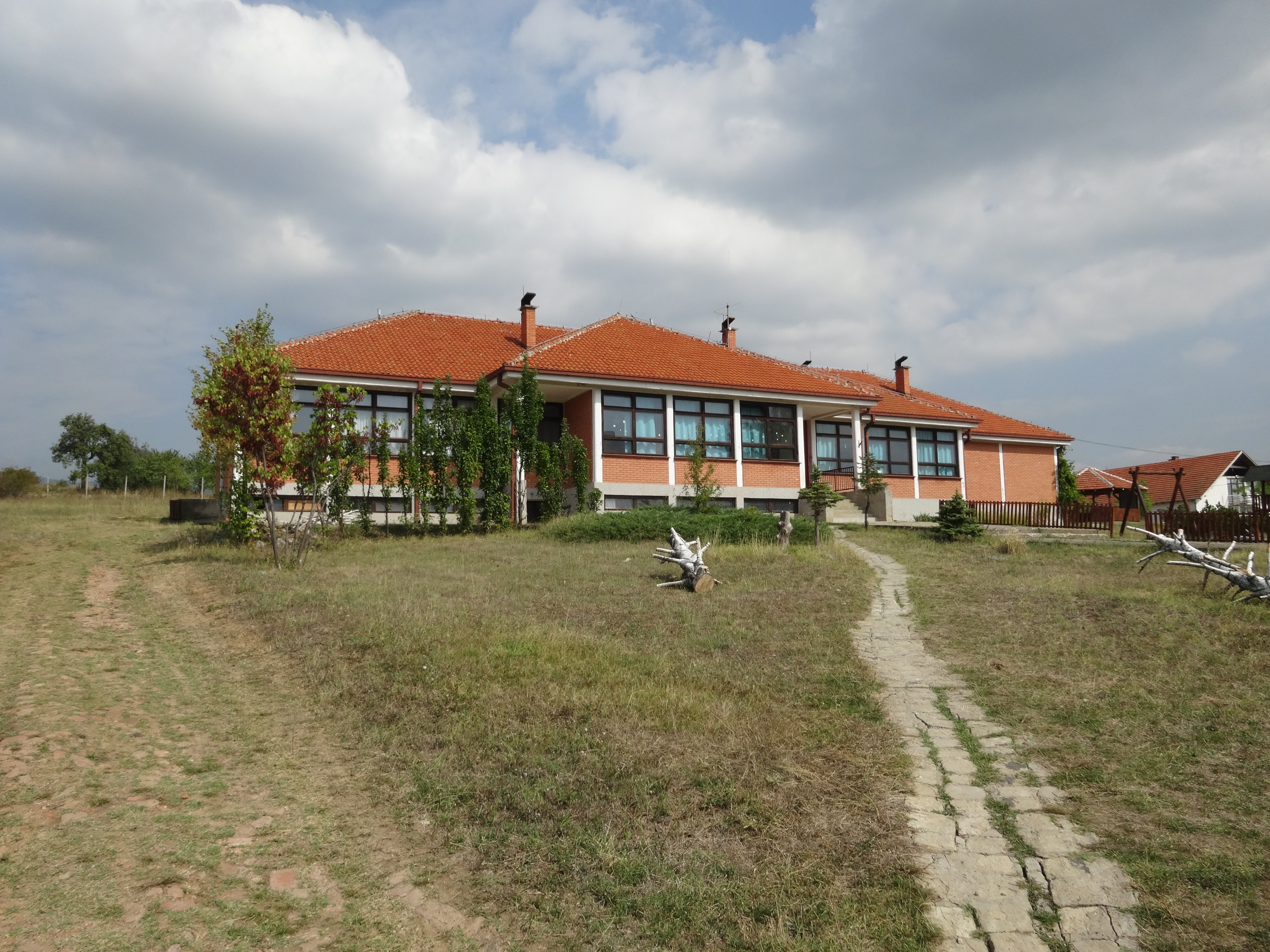
A primary school.

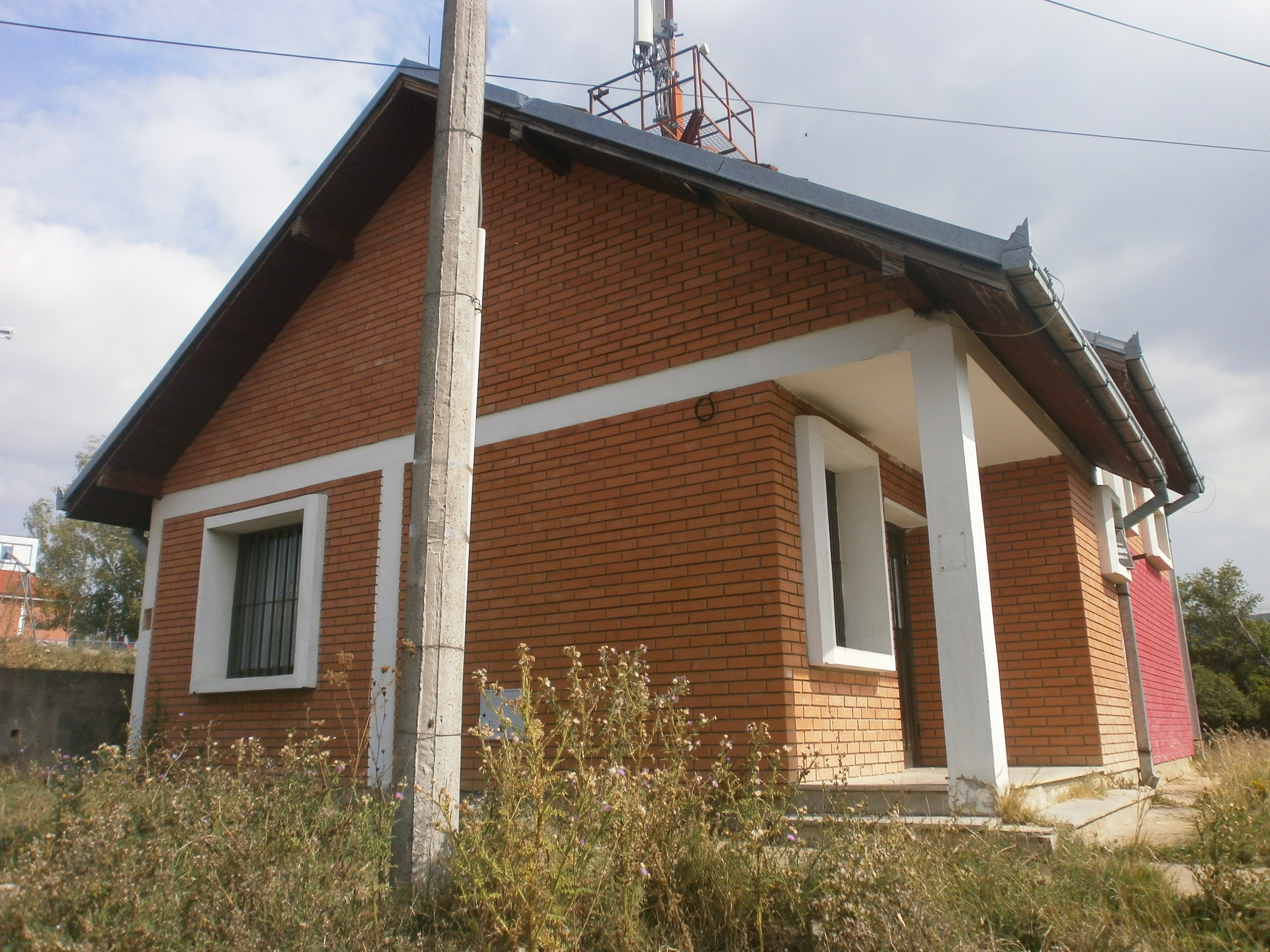
