= Borovnica, Zavidovići =

Borovnica
- Village
- Location within Bosnia and Herzegovina
- Coordinates: 44.3787179°N 18.1919285°E
- Country: Bosnia and Herzegovina
- Entity: Federation of Bosnia and Herzegovina
- Canton: Zenica-Doboj
- Municipality: Zavidovići

Area
  - Total: 3.36 sq mi (8.70 km^{2})

Population (2013)
  - Total: 510
  - Density: 150/sq mi (59/km^{2})
- Time zone: UTC+1 (CET)
  - Summer (DST): UTC+2 (CEST)

Borovnica is a village in the municipality of Zavidovići, Bosnia and Herzegovina. With a population of 510 people (2013 census), the village experienced a significant flood in May 2023.

== Geography ==
Borovnica is located in the Zavidovići municipality southeast of Čardak. It is roughly 9.5 km away from Zavidovići city.

== History ==
According to Biznis Info, on the morning of April 2, 2020, a local man gifted every house in the village of Borovnica a bag of flour. The gift's goal was to improve local morale during the COVID-19 outbreak in Bosnia and Herzegovina.

=== 2023 flood ===
In May 2023, a severe rainstorm flooded Borovnica. Local reports emphasize the effects it had on residents, bridges, and the food supply.

== Demographics ==
According to the 2013 census, its population was 510.

Ethnicity in 2013
Ethnicity	Number	Percentage
Bosniaks	506	99.2%
Croats	0	0.0%
Serbs	0	0.0%
other/undeclared	4	0.8%
Total	510	100%
