= Blace, Prozor-Rama =

Blace
- Village
- Location within Bosnia and Herzegovina
- Coordinates: 43.8276897°N 17.6484048°E
- Country: Bosnia and Herzegovina
- Entity: Federation of Bosnia and Herzegovina
- Canton: Herzegovina-Neretva
- Municipality: Prozor

Area
  - Total: 0.75 sq mi (1.95 km^{2})

Population (2013)
  - Total: 86
  - Density: 110/sq mi (44/km^{2})
- Time zone: UTC+1 (CET)
  - Summer (DST): UTC+2 (CEST)

Blace is a village in the municipality of Prozor-Rama, Bosnia and Herzegovina.

== Demographics ==
According to the 2013 census, its population was 86.

Ethnicity in 2013
Ethnicity	Number	Percentage
Bosniaks	61	70.9%
Croats	25	29.1%
Serbs	0	0.0%
other/undeclared	0	0.0%
Total	86	100%
