= Orašac, Novi Travnik =

Orašac
- Village
- Location within Bosnia and Herzegovina
- Coordinates: 44.0888704°N 17.6640917°E
- Country: Bosnia and Herzegovina
- Entity: Federation of Bosnia and Herzegovina
- Canton: Central Bosnia
- Municipality: Novi Travnik

Area
  - Total: 2.47 sq mi (6.39 km^{2})

Population (2013)
  - Total: 803
  - Density: 325/sq mi (126/km^{2})
- Time zone: UTC+1 (CET)
  - Summer (DST): UTC+2 (CEST)

Orašac is a village in the municipality of Novi Travnik, Bosnia and Herzegovina.

== Demographics ==
According to the 2013 census, its population was 803.

Ethnicity in 2013
Ethnicity	Number	Percentage
Bosniaks	802	99.9%
other/undeclared	1	0.1%
Total	803	100%
