= Blace, Brvenica =

Blace Блаце
- Village
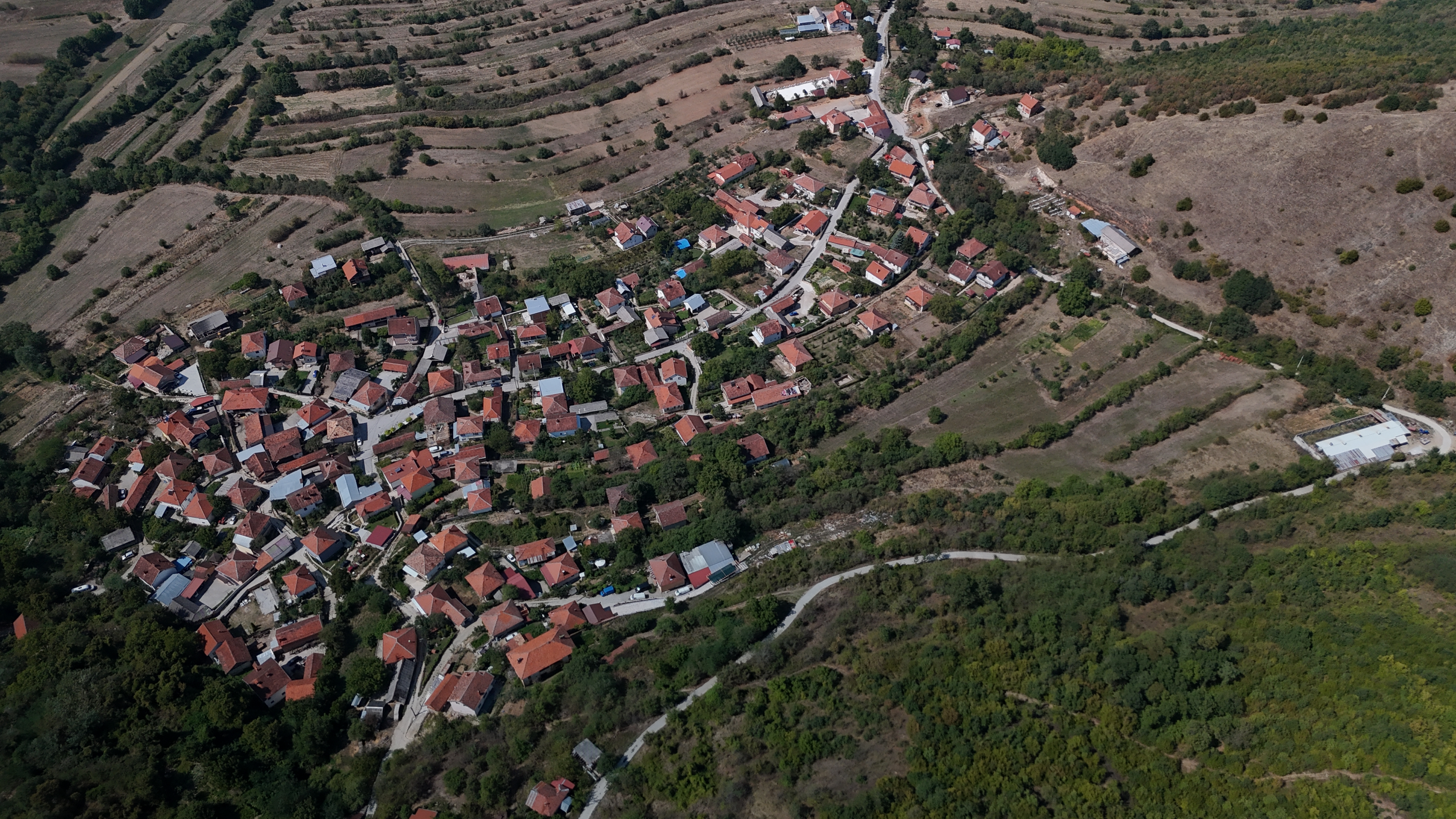
- Air view of the village

- Location within North Macedonia
- Coordinates: 41.89506°N 21.02125°E
- Country: North Macedonia
- Region: Polog
- Municipality: Brvenica

Population (2002)
  - Total: 344
- Time zone: UTC+1 (CET)
  - Summer (DST): UTC+2 (CEST)
- Website: .

Blace (Macedonian: Блаце) is a village in the municipality of Brvenica, North Macedonia.

== Demographics ==
Blace is attested in the 1467/68 Ottoman tax registry (defter) for the Nahiyah of Kalkandelen. The village had a total of 68 Christian households, one bachelor and three widows.

According to the 2002 census, the village had a total of 344 inhabitants. Ethnic groups in the village include:

- Macedonians 344

According to the 1942 Albanian census, Blace was inhabited by six Serbs and 433 Bulgarians.

In statistics gathered by Vasil Kanchov in 1900, the village of Blace was inhabited by 440 Christian Bulgarians.
