= Orašac, Bihać =

Orašac
- Village
- Location within Bosnia and Herzegovina
- Coordinates: 44.627036°N 16.071166°E
- Country: Bosnia and Herzegovina
- Entity: Federation of Bosnia and Herzegovina
- Canton: Una-Sana
- Municipality: Bihać

Area
  - Total: 7.62 sq mi (19.73 km^{2})

Population (2013)
  - Total: 1,356
  - Density: 178.0/sq mi (68.73/km^{2})
- Time zone: UTC+1 (CET)
  - Summer (DST): UTC+2 (CEST)

Orašac is a village in the municipality of Bihać, Bosnia and Herzegovina.

== Demographics ==
According to the 2013 census, its population was 1,356.

Ethnicity in 2013
Ethnicity	Number	Percentage
Bosniaks	1,347	97.5%
Croats	1	0.2%
Serbs	1	0.2%
other/undeclared	7	2.3%
Total	1,356	100%
