= Blace, Konjic =

Blace Блаце
- Village
- Location within Bosnia and Herzegovina
- Coordinates: 43°37′01″N 18°07′01″E
- Country: Bosnia and Herzegovina
- Entity: Federation of Bosnia and Herzegovina
- Canton: Herzegovina-Neretva
- Municipality: Konjic

Area
  - Total: 10.93 sq mi (28.31 km^{2})

Population (2013)
  - Total: 0
  - Density: 0.0/sq mi (0.0/km^{2})
- Time zone: UTC+1 (CET)
  - Summer (DST): UTC+2 (CEST)

Blace (Cyrillic: Блаце) is a village in the municipality of Konjic, Bosnia and Herzegovina.

Blace village (1,215 m) is located in close proximity to the Blatačko Lake on a karstic plateau of the Bjelašnica mountain, on the very edge of the Rakitnica canyon.

== National monument ==
Blace In combination with lake's natural position. and surrounding space's rich cultural-historical heritage, with prehistoric grave mounds, medieval necropolises with stećak and nišani tombstones, in and around the village, forming one combined cultural landscape with part of the deep Rakitnica canyon, and is designated as a National Monument of Bosnia and Herzegovina.

== Demographics ==
According to the 2013 census, its population was nil, down from 21 in 1991.
