= Ploča, Prozor =

Ploča
- Village
- Location within Bosnia and Herzegovina
- Coordinates: 43.8055429°N 17.5536876°E
- Country: Bosnia and Herzegovina
- Entity: Federation of Bosnia and Herzegovina
- Canton: Herzegovina-Neretva
- Municipality: Prozor

Area
  - Total: 0.93 sq mi (2.42 km^{2})

Population (2013)
  - Total: 229
  - Density: 245/sq mi (94.6/km^{2})
- Time zone: UTC+1 (CET)
  - Summer (DST): UTC+2 (CEST)

Ploča is a village in the municipality of Prozor-Rama, Bosnia and Herzegovina.

== Demographics ==
According to the 2013 census, its population was 229.

Ethnicity in 2013
Ethnicity	Number	Percentage
Croats	220	96.1%
other/undeclared	9	3.9%
Total	229	100%
