= Orašac, Prozor =

Orašac
- Village
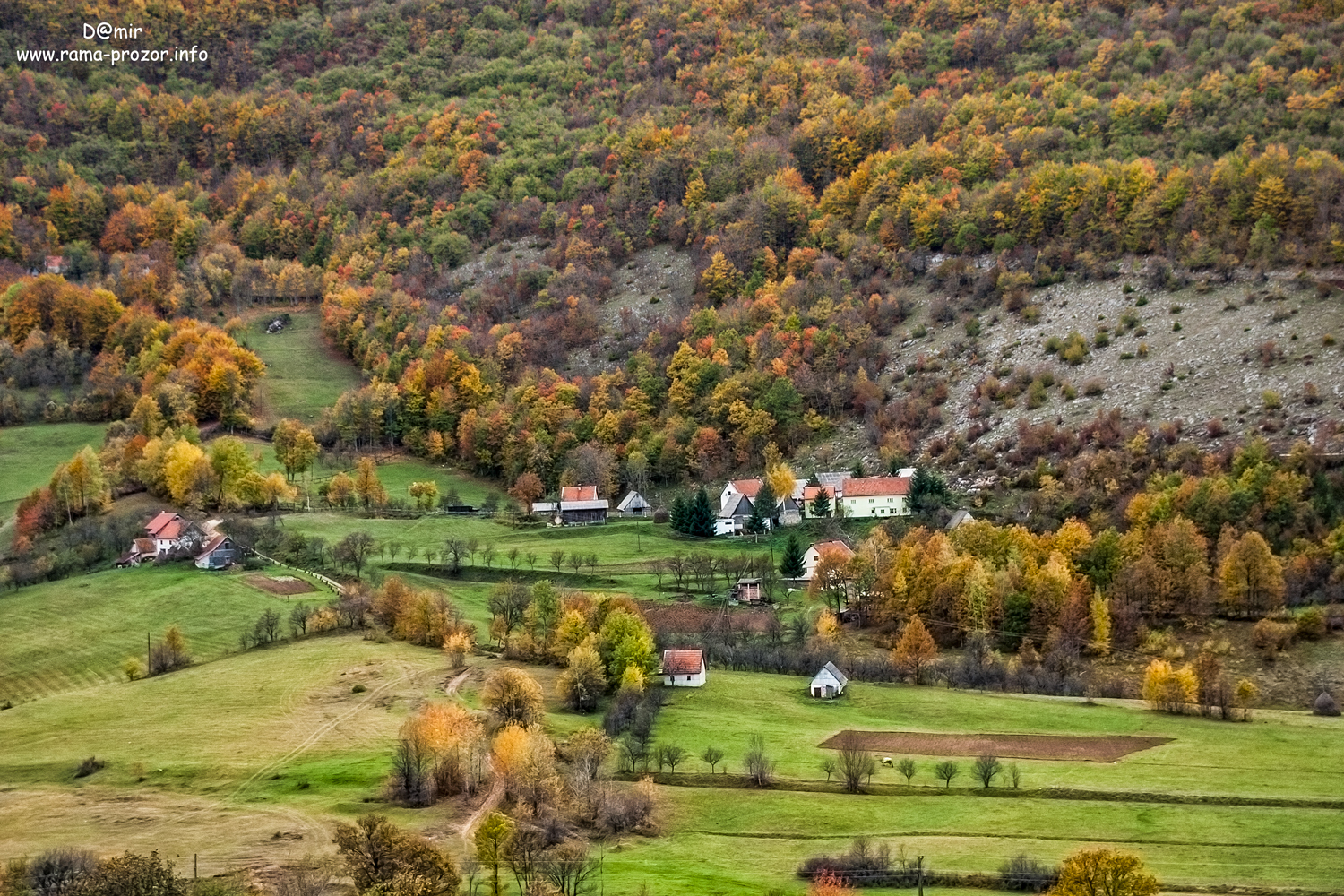

- Location within Bosnia and Herzegovina
- Coordinates: 43.7676669°N 17.5132643°E
- Country: Bosnia and Herzegovina
- Entity: Federation of Bosnia and Herzegovina
- Canton: Herzegovina-Neretva
- Municipality: Prozor

Area
  - Total: 16.69 sq mi (43.23 km^{2})

Population (2013)
  - Total: 456
  - Density: 27.3/sq mi (10.5/km^{2})
- Time zone: UTC+1 (CET)
  - Summer (DST): UTC+2 (CEST)

Orašac is a village in the municipality of Prozor-Rama, Bosnia and Herzegovina.

== Demographics ==
According to the 2013 census, its population was 456.

Ethnicity in 2013
Ethnicity	Number	Percentage
Croats	443	97.1%
Bosniaks	11	2.4%
other/undeclared	2	0.4%
Total	456	100%
