= Prozor-Rama =

Prozor-Rama Općina Prozor-Rama (Serbo-Croatian)
- Town and municipality
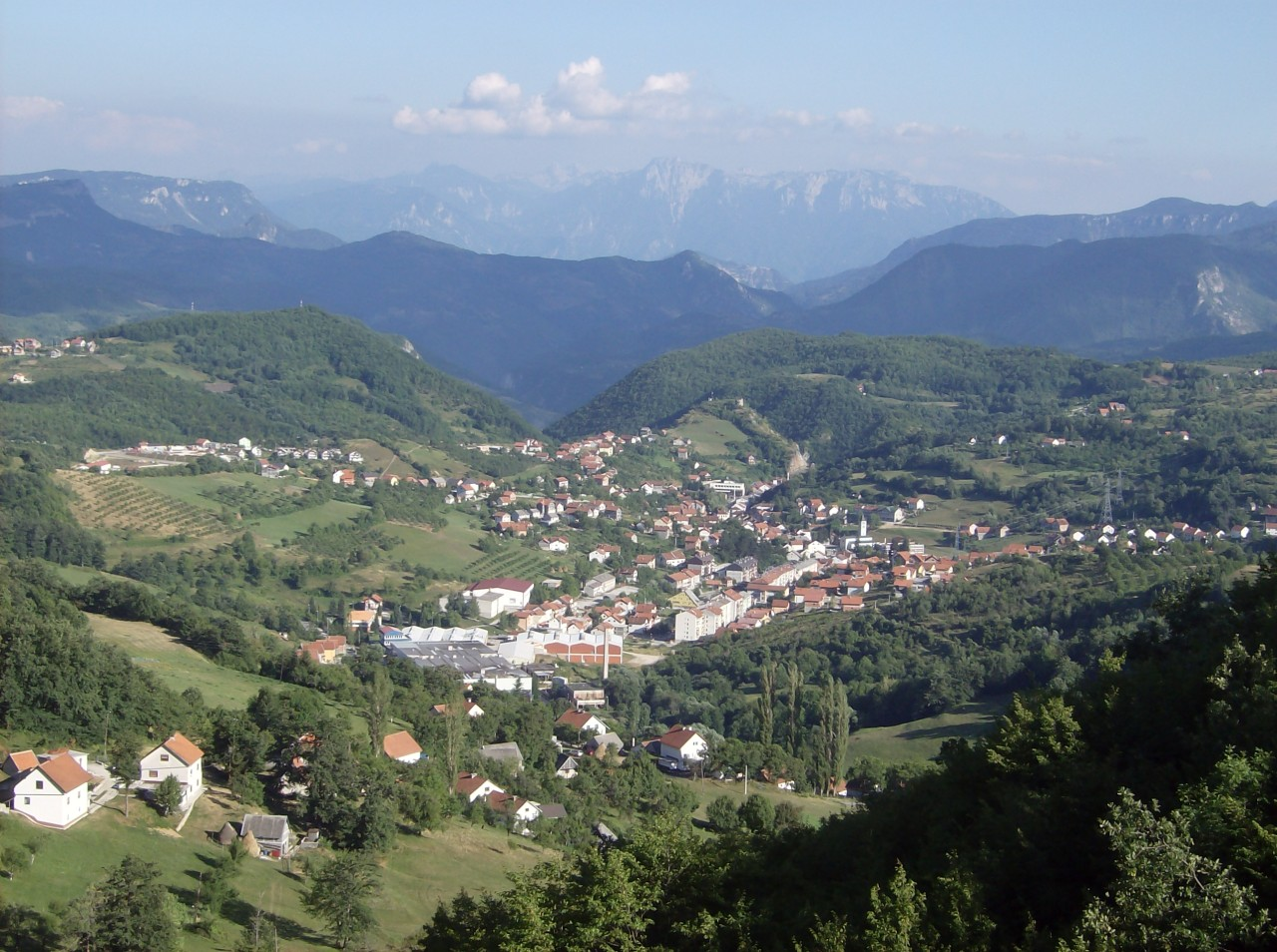
- Panoramic view

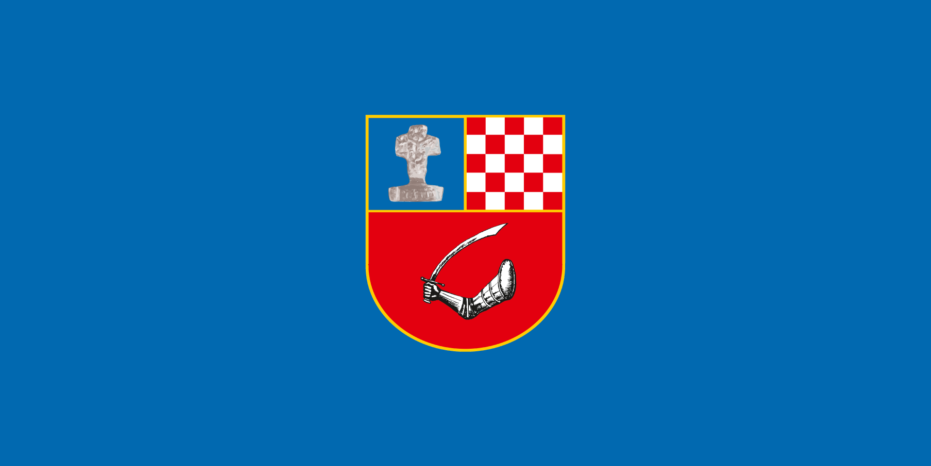
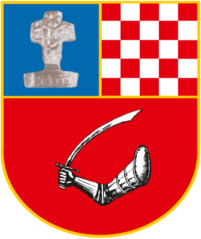
- Flag Seal

- Location of Prozor-Rama within Bosnia and Herzegovina.

- Location within Bosnia and Herzegovina
- Coordinates: 43°49′12″N 17°36′36″E
- Country: Bosnia and Herzegovina
- Entity: Federation of Bosnia and Herzegovina
- Canton: Herzegovina-Neretva
- Geographical region: Herzegovina

Government
  - Municipal mayor: Jozo Ivančević (RNP)

Area
  - Town and municipality: 477 km^{2} (184 sq mi)

Population (2013 census)
  - Town and municipality: 14,280
  - Density: 34/km^{2} (88/sq mi)
  - Urban: 3,367
- Time zone: UTC+1 (CET)
  - Summer (DST): UTC+2 (CEST)
- Area code: +387 36
- Website: www.prozor-rama.org

Prozor-Rama (Serbian Cyrillic: Прозор-Рама) is a municipality located in Herzegovina-Neretva Canton of the Federation of Bosnia and Herzegovina, an entity of Bosnia and Herzegovina. Its seat is Prozor. Also, Ramsko lake is located in the municipality.

== History ==
In the Middle Ages, the King of Hungary held the title of King of Rama named after this region.

When the German and Italian Zones of Influence were revised on 24 June 1942, Prozor fell in Zone III, administered civilly by Croatia and militarily by Croatia and Germany.

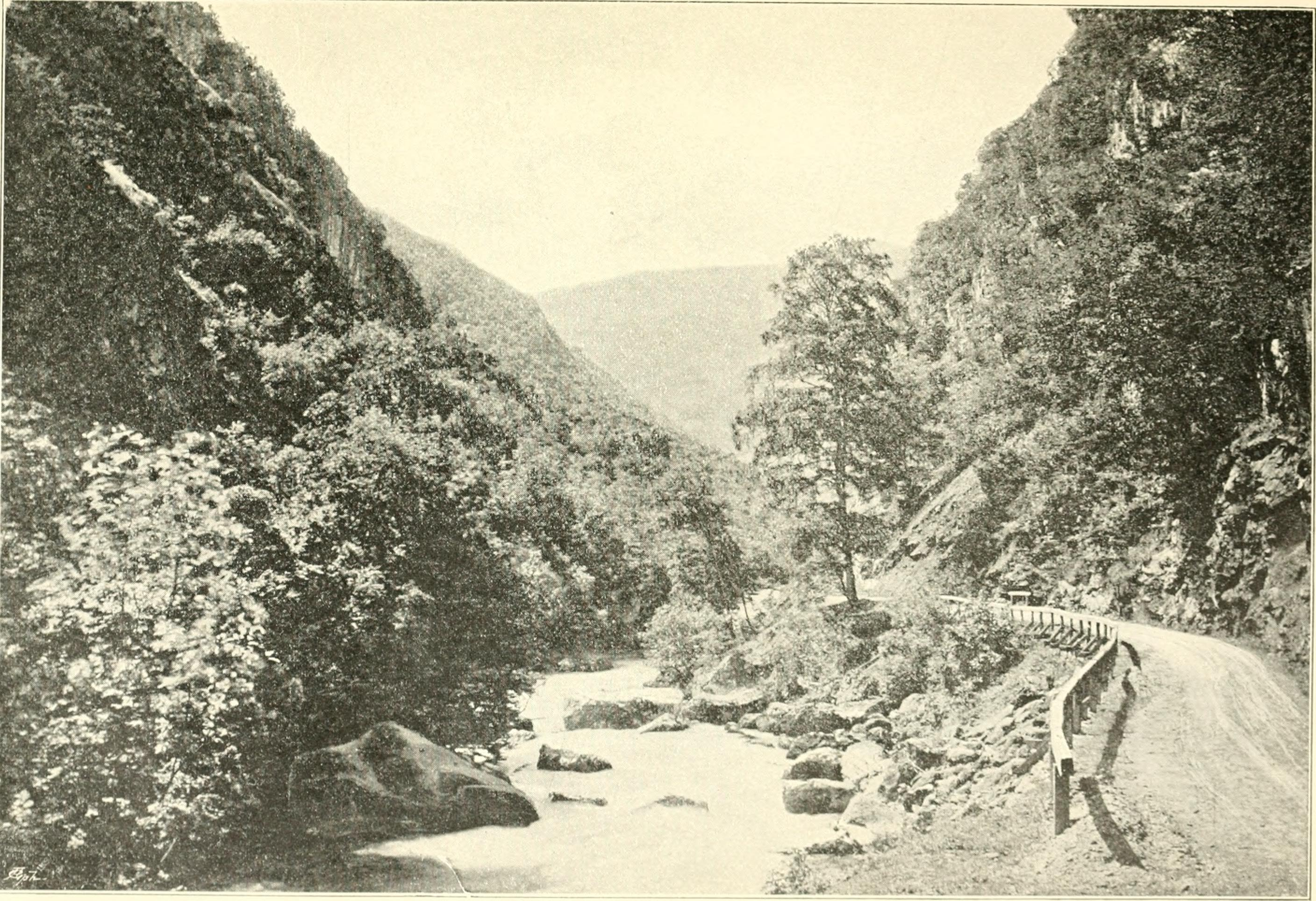
Seferov-Han in the Rama valley, 1897

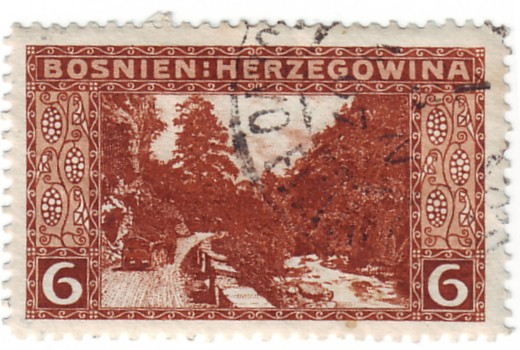
Rama valley on 1906 Austro-Hungarian stamp

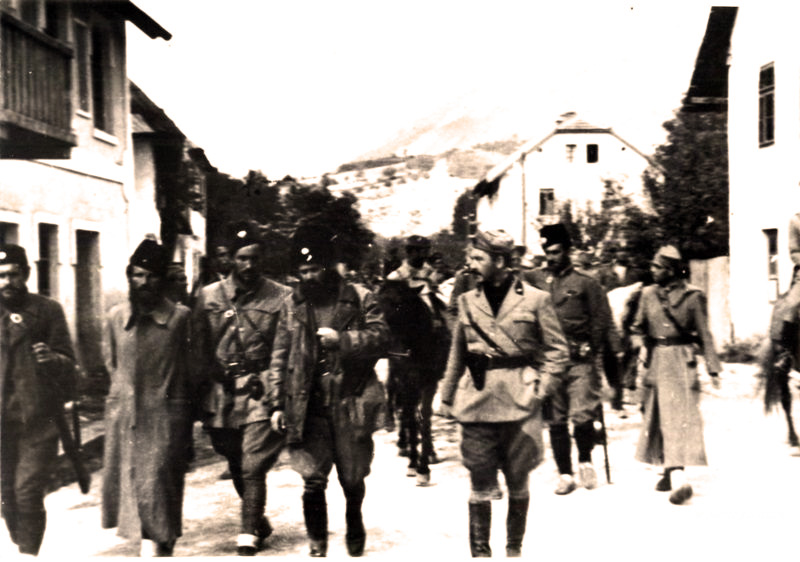
Italians and Chetniks in Prozor in 1943 ("Operation Alfa")

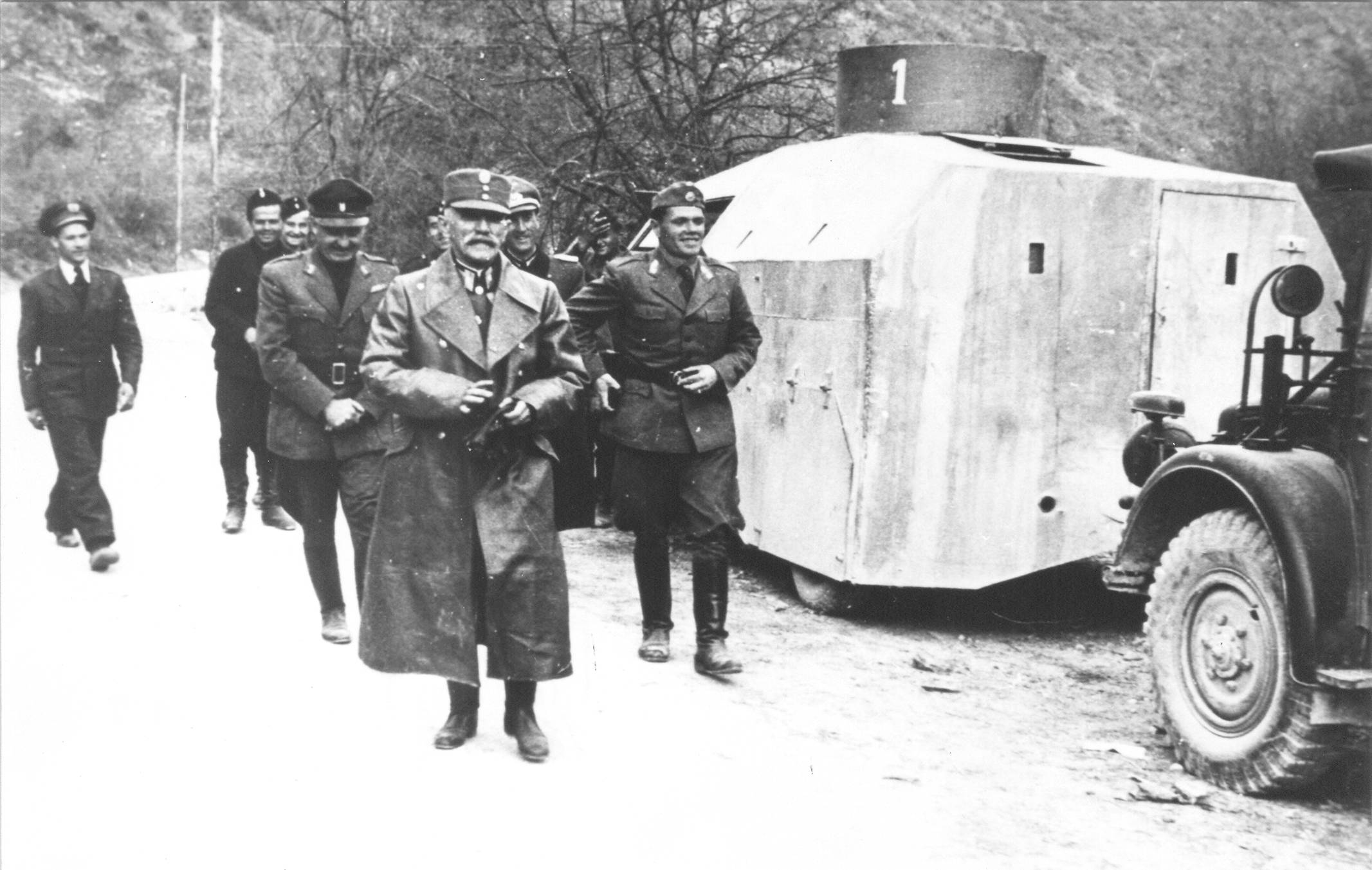
Ustasha in Prozor, 1943

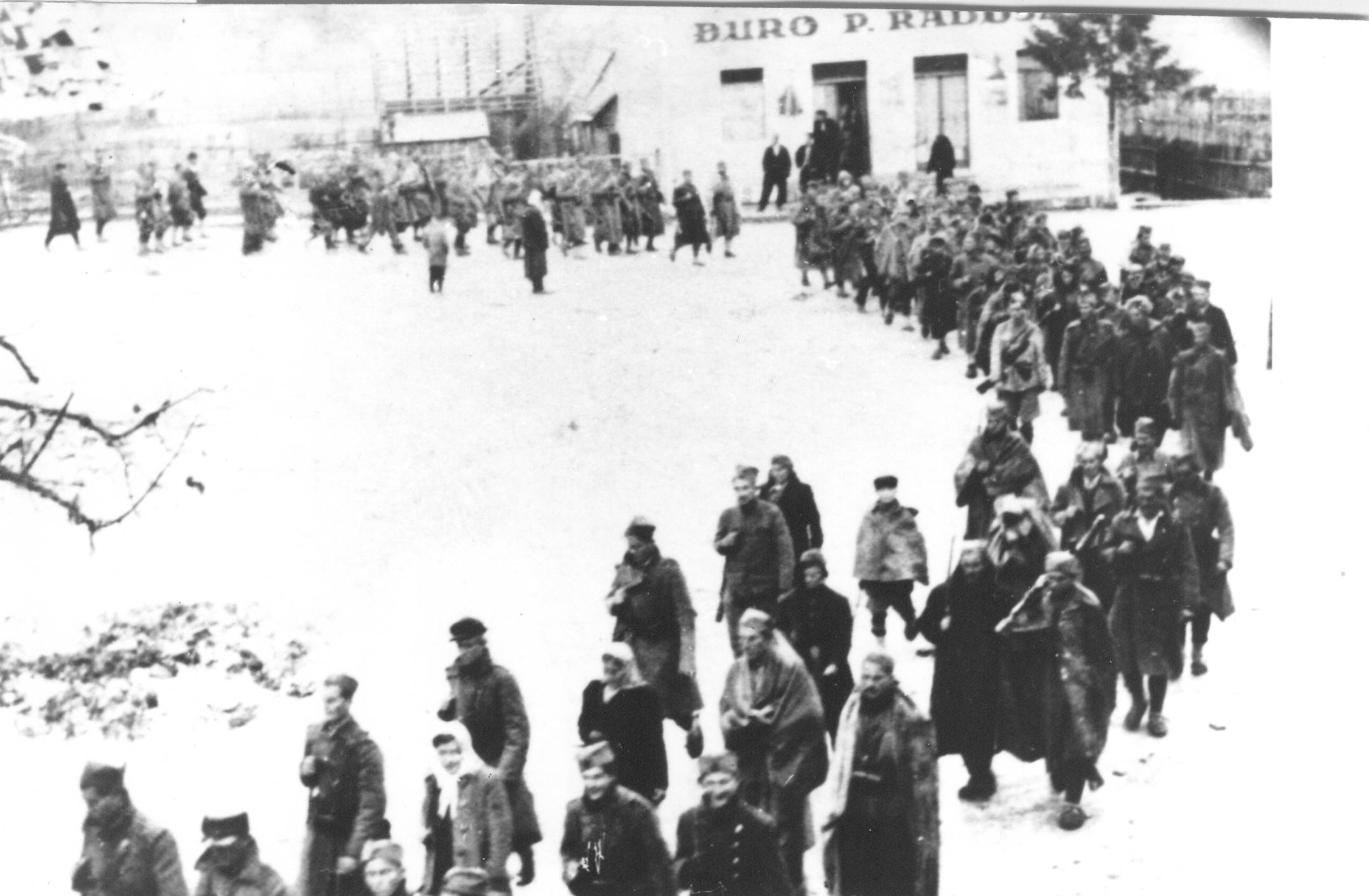
Partisans in Prozor, winter of 1942–1943

== Demographics ==
North Herzegovina

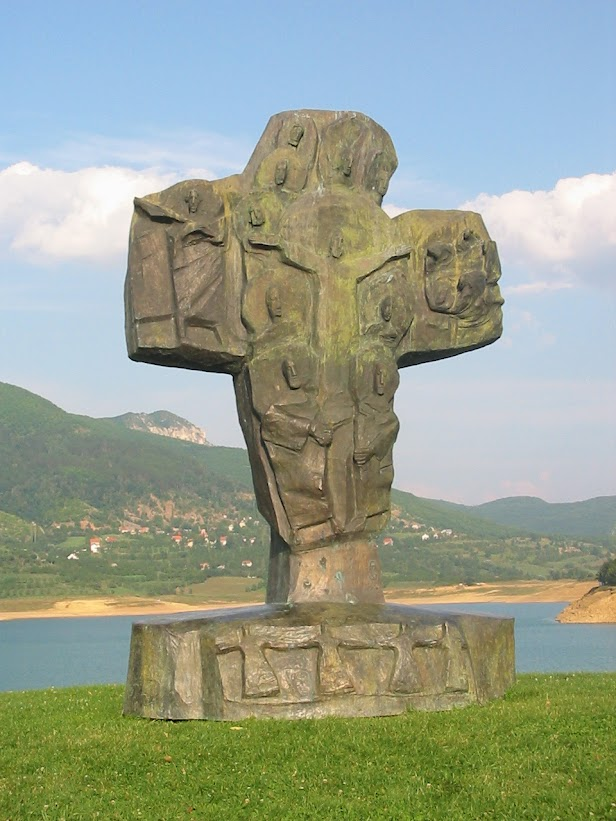
Cross monument by the Šćit monastery, Rama

According to the 2013 census, the population of the municipality was 14,280 and of the seat Prozor 3,367.

=== 2013 ===
14,280 total

- 10,702 Croats (74.94%)
- 3,525 Bosniaks (24.69%)
- 3 Serbs (0.02%)
- 50 others (0.35%)

=== Settlements ===
Towns and settlements in the municipality are Blace, Borovnica, Dobroša Donja Vast, Donji Krančići, Donji Višnjani, Družinovići, Duge, Gmići, Gorica, Gornji Krančići, Gornji Višnjani, Gračac, Gračanica, Grevići, Heljdovi, Here, Hudutsko, Ivanci, Jaklići, Klek, Kovačevo Polje, Kozo, Kućani, Kute, Lapsunj, Lizoperci, Ljubunci, Lug, Maglice, Meopotočje, Mluša, Ometala, Orašac, Pajići, Parcani, Paroš, Ploča, Podbor, Proslap, Prozor, Ravnica, Ripci, Rumboci, Šćipe, Šćit, Šerovina, Skrobućani, Šlimac, Tošćanica, Trišćani, Ustirama, Uzdol, Varvara and Zahum.

== Sports ==
The area is home to the football club HNK Rama, and basketball club HKK Rama.

== Notable people ==
- Diva Grabovčeva
- Marko Bošnjak

== Bibliography ==
- Trgo, Fabijan, ed. (1964). Zbornik dokumenata i podataka o Narodno-oslobodilačkom ratu Jugoslovenskih naroda. Vol. V, 32.
