= Ramsko lake (Bosnia and Herzegovina) =

Reservoirs in Prozor-Rama, Bosnia and Herzegovina

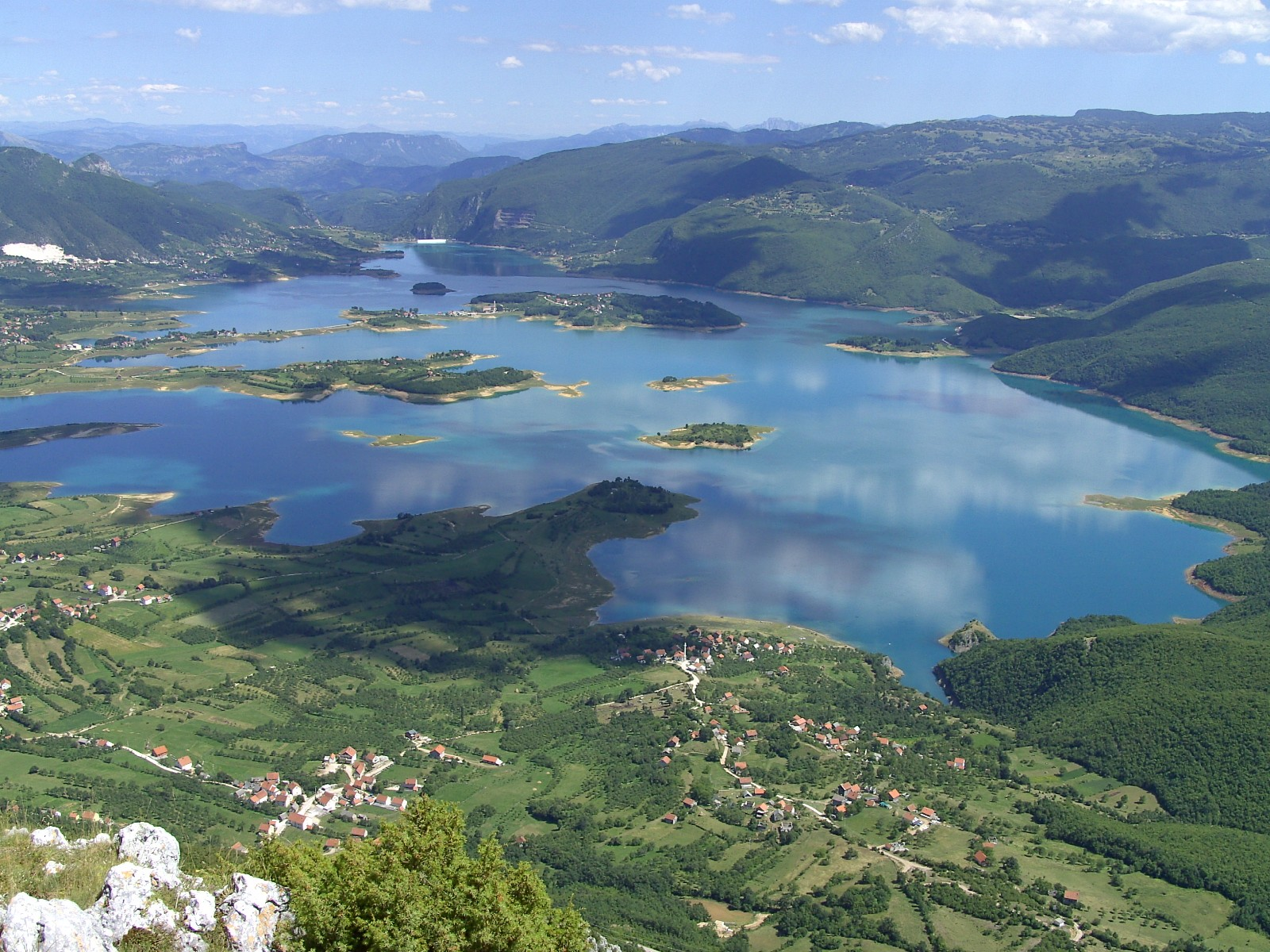
- Ramsko lake

- Rama lake location in Bosnia and Herzegovina
- Interactive map of Ramsko lake
- Location: Prozor-Rama (North Herzegovina)
- Coordinates: 43.8057°N 17.5183°E
- Type: Accumulation (reservoir)
- Catchment area: Rama→ Neretva
- Basin countries: Bosnia and Herzegovina
- Surface area: 14.74 km^{2} (5.69 mi^{2})
- Surface elevation: 595 m (1,952 ft)
- Settlements: Prozor-Rama

Ramsko lake (Serbo-Croatian: Ramsko jezero) is an artificial lake (reservoir), located in municipality of Prozor-Rama, in the vicinity of eponymous town, in Bosnia and Herzegovina. Lake is created with a construction of Rama dam in 1968, on the river Rama, and it serves as a reservoir to store Rama's waters used by Rama Hydroelectric Power Station. The temperature of the lake is around 7.5 °C (45.5 °F).

== See also ==
- List of lakes in Bosnia and Herzegovina
