= List of settlements in the Federation of Bosnia and Herzegovina/Z =

== Za ==
Zabilje (municipality Vitez), Zabor, Zabrđani, Zabrđe (municipality Kiseljak), Zabrđe, Zabus, Začula (municipality Ravno), Zagorice, Zagorje, Zagradinje (municipality Ravno), Zagrađe (municipality Travnik), Zahum (municipality Prozor-Rama), Zakalje, Zanesovići (municipality Bugojno), Zapeće (municipality Dobretići), Zaplanik (municipality Ravno), Zapljevac, Zarače (municipality Busovača), Zasavica (municipality Dobretići), Zaselje (municipality Travnik), Zaselje (municipality Vitez), Zaslivlje, Zastinje (municipality Uskoplje), Zavala (municipality Ravno), Zavelim, Zavidovići, Završje, Završje (municipality Kiseljak)

== Zd ==
Zdaljevac (municipality Jajce)

== Ze ==
Zebina Šuma, Zemegresi, Zenepići (municipality Novi Travnik), Zenica

== Zi ==
Zidine

== Zl ==
Zlate, Zlavast (municipality Bugojno), Zlokuće (municipality Bugojno)

== Zo ==
Zorlaci, Zorovići

== Zu ==
Zubići (municipality Novi Travnik) Zubovići (municipality Dobretići), Zubovići, Zubovići u Oglečevi, Zukići, Zupčići

== Zv ==
Zvirići, Zvirovići, Zvizd (municipality Kreševo)
