= List of settlements in the Federation of Bosnia and Herzegovina/H =

List of settlements in the Federation of Bosnia and Herzegovina - H
| Settlement | City or municipality | Canton |
|---|---|---|
| Hadrovići | Bugojno | |
| Hadžići | Goražde | |
| Hadžići | | Sarajevo Canton |
| Hajradinovići | | |
| Hamzići | Čitluk | |
| Hapstići | | |
| Harambašići | | |
| Hardomilje | | |
| Hasanovići | | |
| Herići | | |
| Hladila | | |
| Hodovo (part) | Stolac | |
| Homatlije | | |
| Homolje | | |
| Hondići | | |
| Hotanj | | |
| Hrančići | | |
| Hrašljani | | |
| Hrgud (part) | Stolac | |
| Hrid | Goražde | |
| Hrušanj | | |
| Hubjeri | | |
| Hum | Bugojno | |
| Humac | Bugojno | |
| Humac | Ljubuški | |
