= List of settlements in the Federation of Bosnia and Herzegovina/Ž =

== Ža ==
Žaovine (Jajce), Žabljak (Livno)

== Žd ==
Ždralovići (Bugojno), Ždrimci (Uskoplje)

== Že ==
Željuša (Mostar), Žepče, Žeželovo (Kiseljak)

== Ži ==
Žigovi Goražde, Žilići Goražde, Žirović Livno, Žitomislići (Mostar), Žitovo Goražde, Živčići (Fojnica), Živinice Tuzla Canton, Živojevići Goražde

== Žu ==
Žuglići Jablanica, Žukovica (Neum), Župa Drvar, Župica Drvar, Žuželo
