= Ljeskovik =

Ljeskovik may refer to:

- Ljeskovik (Goražde)
- Ljeskovik (Srebrenica)
