= List of settlements in the Federation of Bosnia and Herzegovina/N =

== Ne ==
Nekopi, Nenovići (municipality Ravno), Neum (Herzegovina-Neretva Canton), Nevada (municipality Ravno), Nevorići

== No ==
Novakovići, Novi Travnik
