= Strane =

Strane may refer to:

- Strane, Busovača, a village in Bosnia and Herzegovina
- Strane, Kalinovik, a village in Republika Srpska, Bosnia and Herzegovina
- Strane, Pale, a village in Bosnia and Herzegovina
- Strane, Postojna, a small village in Inner Carniola, Slovenia
