= Carica, Busovača =

Carica
- Village
- Location within Bosnia and Herzegovina
- Coordinates: 44.0836°N 17.8776°E
- Country: Bosnia and Herzegovina
- Entity: Federation of Bosnia and Herzegovina
- Canton: Central Bosnia
- Municipality: Busovača

Area
  - Total: 1.52 sq mi (3.93 km^{2})

Population (2013)
  - Total: 623
  - Density: 411/sq mi (159/km^{2})
- Time zone: UTC+1 (CET)
  - Summer (DST): UTC+2 (CEST)

Carica is a village in the municipality of Busovača, Bosnia and Herzegovina.

== Name ==
The name of this village translates to "Empress" from the native language.

== Demographics ==
According to the 2013 census, its population was 623.

Ethnicity in 2013
Ethnicity	Number	Percentage
Croats	530	85.1%
Bosniaks	80	12.8%
Serbs	5	0.8%
other/undeclared	8	1.3%
Total	623	100%
