= Grablje =

Grablje may refer to:

- Grablje, Busovača, a village in the Central Bosnia Canton, Bosnia and Herzegovina
- Grablje, Ljubinje, a village in the municipality of Ljubinje, Bosnia and Herzegovina
