= Rusanj (Novo Goražde) =

Rusanj Русањ
- Village
- Location within Bosnia and Herzegovina
- Coordinates: 43°38′N 19°01′E
- Country: Bosnia and Herzegovina
- Entity: Republika Srpska
- Municipality: Novo Goražde
- Time zone: UTC+1 (CET)
  - Summer (DST): UTC+2 (CEST)

Rusanj (Cyrillic: Русањ) is a village in the municipality of Novo Goražde, Republika Srpska, Bosnia and Herzegovina.

== Geography ==
Rusanj lies in the upper Drina basin in eastern Bosnia, in the hilly country on the eastern slopes of Jahorina. The municipality of Novo Goražde, of which the village forms part, covers 123 square kilometres at elevations ranging from 335 to 1,300 metres above sea level, and borders the municipalities of Višegrad, Čajniče, Rogatica and Foča as well as the city of Goražde. The administrative seat of the municipality is at Kopači, some kilometres to the south-west.

== History ==
Until the Bosnian War, Rusanj belonged to the municipality of Goražde. In 1994 the parts of that municipality held by Serb forces were constituted as a separate municipality, first named Srpsko Goražde and later Ustiprača, before adopting its present name of Novo Goražde; the division was subsequently confirmed by the Dayton Agreement of 1995. Rusanj passed in its entirety to Republika Srpska, whereas several settlements of the pre-war municipality were split between the two entities.

== Demographics ==
=== Population ===
Census	Population
1991	36
2013	19

=== Ethnic composition ===
Ethnicity	1991	2013
Serbs	36 (100%)	19 (100%)
Total	36	19
