= Katići, Bosnia and Herzegovina =

Katići
- Village
- Location within Bosnia and Herzegovina
- Coordinates: 44.1337016°N 17.8926076°E
- Country: Bosnia and Herzegovina
- Entity: Federation of Bosnia and Herzegovina
- Canton: Central Bosnia
- Municipality: Busovača

Area
  - Total: 0.093 sq mi (0.24 km^{2})

Population (2013)
  - Total: 134
  - Density: 1,400/sq mi (560/km^{2})
- Time zone: UTC+1 (CET)
  - Summer (DST): UTC+2 (CEST)

Katići is a village in the municipality of Busovača, Bosnia and Herzegovina.

== Demographics ==
According to the 2013 census, its population was 134.

Ethnicity in 2013
Ethnicity	Number	Percentage
Bosniaks	133	99.3%
other/undeclared	1	0.7%
Total	134	100%
