= Stubica =

Stubica may refer to:

- Stubica, Busovača, a village in Bosnia and Herzegovina
- Stubica, Ljubuški, a village in Bosnia and Herzegovina
- Donja Stubica, a town in Krapina-Zagorje County, Croatia
- Gornja Stubica, a municipality in Krapina-Zagorje County, Croatia
- Stubica, Primorje-Gorski Kotar County, a village near Vrbovsko, Croatia
- Stubica, Plužine, a village in Montenegro
- Stubica (Lazarevac), a village in Serbia
- Stubica (Paraćin), a village in Serbia

== See also ==
- Hum Stubički (lit. "Hum of Stubica"), a town in the municipality of Gornja Stubica
- Stubičke Toplice (lit. "Stubica spa"), a spa town in Krapina-Zagorje County
