= Zidine =

Zidine may refer to:

- Zidine, Novo Goražde, a village in Republika Srpska
- Zidine, Tomislavgrad, a village in Bosnia and Herzegovina
