= Hrasno, Busovača =

Hrasno
- Village
- Location within Bosnia and Herzegovina
- Coordinates: 44°07′58″N 17°51′07″E
- Country: Bosnia and Herzegovina
- Entity: Federation of Bosnia and Herzegovina
- Canton: Central Bosnia
- Municipality: Busovača

Area
  - Total: 0.91 sq mi (2.35 km^{2})

Population (2013)
  - Total: 348
  - Density: 384/sq mi (148/km^{2})
- Time zone: UTC+1 (CET)
  - Summer (DST): UTC+2 (CEST)

Hrasno is a village in the municipality of Busovača, Bosnia and Herzegovina.

== Demographics ==
According to the 2013 census, its population was 348.

Ethnicity in 2013
Ethnicity	Number	Percentage
Croats	330	94.8%
Bosniaks	4	1.1%
Serbs	12	3.4%
other/undeclared	2	0.6%
Total	348	100%
