= Šudine =

- Village
- Location within Bosnia and Herzegovina
- Coordinates: 44°06′N 17°56′E
- Country: Bosnia and Herzegovina
- Entity: Federation of Bosnia and Herzegovina
- Canton: Central Bosnia
- Municipality: Busovača

Area
  - Total: 0.23 sq mi (0.60 km^{2})

Population (2013)
  - Total: 143
  - Density: 620/sq mi (240/km^{2})
- Time zone: UTC+1 (CET)
  - Summer (DST): UTC+2 (CEST)

Šudine is a village in the municipality of Busovača, Bosnia and Herzegovina.

== Demographics ==
According to the 2013 census, its population was 143, all Bosniaks.
