= Mehurići =

- Village
- Location within Bosnia and Herzegovina
- Coordinates: 44°03′N 17°56′E
- Country: Bosnia and Herzegovina
- Entity: Federation of Bosnia and Herzegovina
- Canton: Central Bosnia
- Municipality: Busovača

Area
  - Total: 1.89 sq mi (4.89 km^{2})

Population (2013)
  - Total: 65
  - Density: 34/sq mi (13/km^{2})
- Time zone: UTC+1 (CET)
  - Summer (DST): UTC+2 (CEST)

Mehurići is a village in the municipality of Busovača, Bosnia and Herzegovina.

== Demographics ==
According to the 2013 census, its population was 65, all Bosniaks.
