= Očehnići =

- Village
- Location within Bosnia and Herzegovina
- Coordinates: 44°03′48″N 17°55′05″E
- Country: Bosnia and Herzegovina
- Entity: Federation of Bosnia and Herzegovina
- Canton: Central Bosnia
- Municipality: Busovača

Area
  - Total: 1.20 sq mi (3.12 km^{2})

Population (2013)
  - Total: 5
  - Density: 4.2/sq mi (1.6/km^{2})
- Time zone: UTC+1 (CET)
  - Summer (DST): UTC+2 (CEST)

Očehnići is a village in the municipality of Busovača, Bosnia and Herzegovina.

== Demographics ==
According to the 2013 census, its population was 5, all Croats.
