= Borak Brdo =

Borak Brdo Борак Брдо
- Village
- Location within Bosnia and Herzegovina
- Coordinates: 43°42′03″N 19°01′32″E
- Country: Bosnia and Herzegovina
- Entity: Republika Srpska
- Municipality: Novo Goražde

Population
  - Total: 22
- Time zone: UTC+1 (CET)
  - Summer (DST): UTC+2 (CEST)

Borak Brdo (Cyrillic: Борак Брдо) is a village in the municipality of Novo Goražde, Republika Srpska, Bosnia and Herzegovina.
