= Dragovići (Novo Goražde) =

Coordinates: 43°34′26″N 18°57′48″E

Dragovići Драговићи
- Village
- Interactive map of Dragovići
- Country: Bosnia and Herzegovina
- Republic: Republika Srpska
- Municipality: Novo Goražde

Population
  - Total: 55
- Time zone: UTC+1 (CET)
  - Summer (DST): UTC+2 (CEST)

Dragovići (Cyrillic: Драговићи) is a village in the municipality of Novo Goražde, Republika Srpska, Bosnia and Herzegovina.
