= Church of St. George, Sopotnica =

Church of St. George
- Church of Saint George
- Crkva Svetog Đorđa
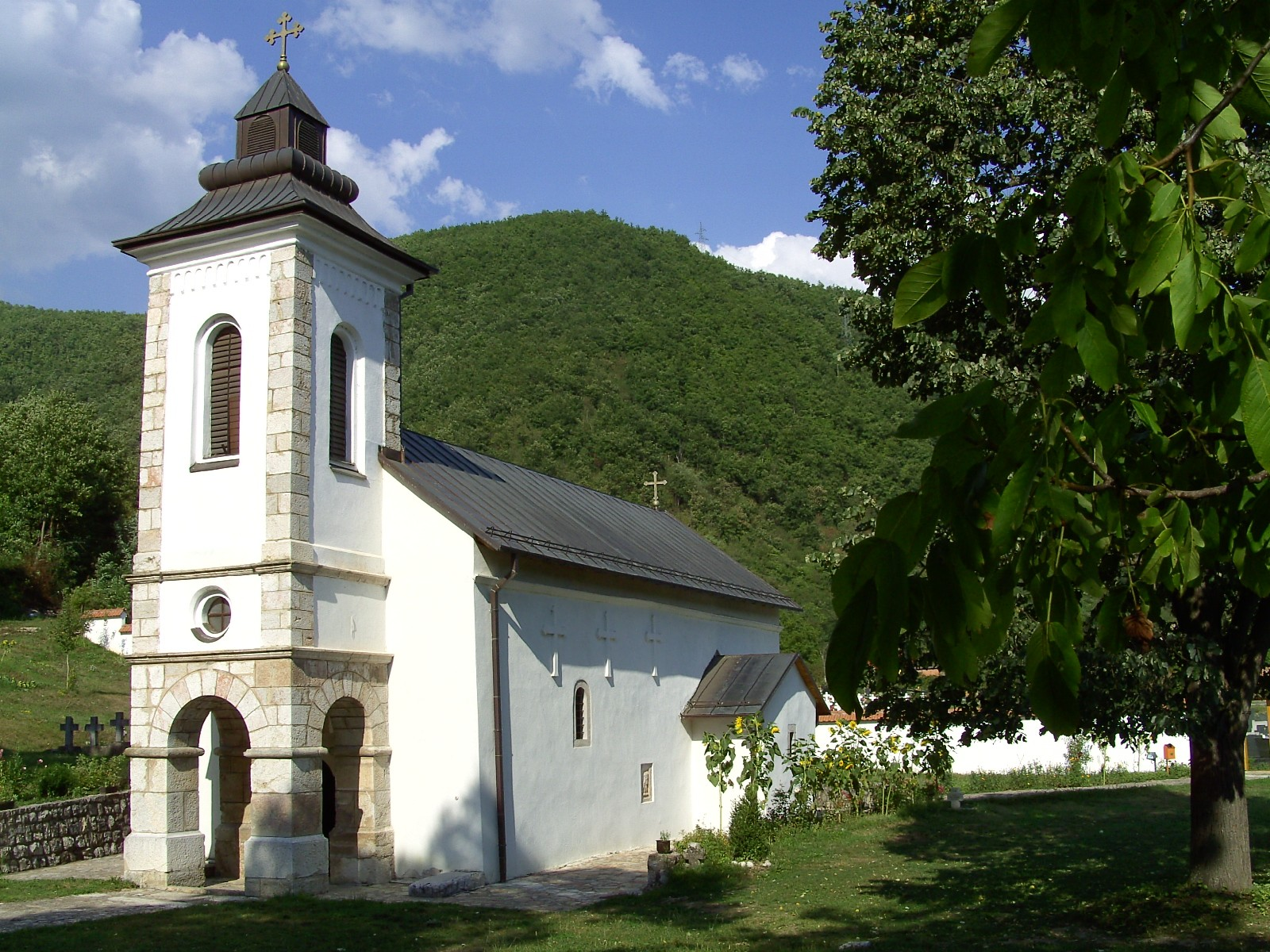

- Location within Bosnia and Herzegovina
- Church of St. George
- 43.6834°N 19.0018°E
- Location: Sopotnica, Novo Goražde
- Country: Bosnia and Herzegovina
- Denomination: Serbian Orthodox Church

History
- Founded: 1454
- Founder: Stjepan Vukčić

Architecture
- Functional status: open
- Heritage designation: National Monument of Bosnia and Herzegovina
- Designated: 2008
- Architectural type: Chapel
- Style: Medieval Bosnian Drina type with Romanesque and Gothic style elements
- Years built: around 1454

KONS of Bosnia and Herzegovina
- Official name: Church of Saint George in Sopotnica, the architectural ensemble
- Type: Category I cultural property
- Criteria: A, B, C iii.iv.v., D iv., E i.iii.iv.v, G i.iii.v.vi.
- Designated: 5 November 2008 (decision No. 07.1-02-81/03-10)
- Reference no.: 3057
- List of National Monuments of Bosnia and Herzegovina

The Church of Saint George, Sopotnica (Serbian Cyrillic: Црква светог Ђорђа, Сопотница) is a Serbian Orthodox church and the protected National Monument located at the village of Donja Sopotnica in the Municipality of Novo Goražde in eastern Republika Srpska, Bosnia and Herzegovina. The church stands on the left bank of the Drina River, four kilometres from the town of Goražde. The church was built in 1454 and expended in 1455. Its benefactor was Stjepan Vukčić Kosača, while the patron saint of this church is Saint George of Lydda.

== History and architecture ==
The church is located four kilometres to the north of Goražde, in the village of Donja Sopotnica, on the left bank of the Drina river. The region was, at the time, part of Humska zemlja that would later come to be known as Herzegovina, after Stjepan's 'Herceg title. It was built in 1454 by Stjepan Vukčić Kosača, when Goražde was part of a region ruled by him. Herzegovina was gradually conquered by the Ottoman Empire between 1465 and 1481.

=== 1st phase - main building construction ===
The church was built in several phases. The first and oldest part was built in the mid 15th century as a small single-nave cruciform church of the Drina Type. The main measurements of the inside of the building, excluding the apse and choirs, are 8.50 by 4.50 m, while the height of the church is 7 metres at its pointed vault.

A small single-nave cruciform main structure includes a semicircular altar apse and rectangular choirs symmetrical to it in the direction of north to south. It has a pointed vault and blind. Inside, a Romanesque arcades of the wall surfaces, are prominent feature. The choirs are 2 by1.70 m, with a barrel vaults of 2.90m high apex. The walls of the choirs and of the nave are 1.10 m tick, and the altar apse (semicircular inside and out) occupies the full width of the nave, with a radius of 2.12 m (on the long axis of the building), while the transverse radius is 1.83 m. The apse is lower than the nave, with the inner apex of the dome being 3.40 m above floor.

=== 2nd phase - Catholic chapel added ===
The second phase included adding a Catholic chapel at the request of the Herceg-Stjepan himself, and construction works were already finished as early as 1455. This chapel was added for the Herceg’s second wife, Catholic princess Barbara, "daughter of the Most Illustrious Duke of Bavaria" (Latin: filia illustris ducis de Payro; she was probably illegitimate daughter of Duke Henry XVI), so that she could pray there. The first authority to refer to this feature was Metropolitan of Dabar-Bosnia Sava Kosanović, while commenting on churches that have a parvis “to the left of the altar like [the church] in Goražde,” and remarked that “the wife of Herceg Stjepan, who was of the Latin confession, prayed to God in that parvis”.

Immediately after the main building was finished, a 3 by 1.80 m rectangular paraklis (kind of a chapel) was built onto the north side of the altar parvis in the extension and next to the north choir, from which this new space is entered. Like the north choir, this chapel also has a barrel vault, with the same level apex at the 2.90 m. The paraklis was lit through A small window in shape of an inverse loophole to the east existed but was sometime later walled up. Its purpose was to bring daily light to this chapel.

=== Enlargement and restoration works ===
In the second half of the 16th century, during the office of Serbian Patriarch Makarije Sokolović, the church was enlarged on its western side. It was repaired in 1869, when a metal door was installed at its entrance, which was donated by a Serb from Sarajevo. Remains of its old frescoes were then carefully collected and buried beside the church's wall. A bell tower was added at the church's western side in 1894. At the beginning of the Bosnian War, the church was shelled and set on fire in September 1992. It remained roofless until October 1994, when a temporary roof was installed. The church was restored between 2000 and 2002, and in 2008, it was designated as a National Monument of Bosnia and Herzegovina by the KONS.

== Other uses ==
In 1519, at the beginning of the Ottoman rule over Herzegovina, one of the earliest printing houses in the region was established at the church. Known as the Goražde printing house, it was the first such facility in the territory of present-day Bosnia and Herzegovina. It produced three books: a hieratikon (priest's service book) in 1519, a psalter in 1521, and a small euchologion in 1523.

== See also ==
- Church of St. Archangel Michael
- Cathedral of the Nativity of the Theotokos, Sarajevo
