= Gusti Grab =

- Village
- Location within Bosnia and Herzegovina
- Coordinates: 44°04′04″N 17°56′55″E
- Country: Bosnia and Herzegovina
- Entity: Federation of Bosnia and Herzegovina
- Canton: Central Bosnia
- Municipality: Busovača

Area
  - Total: 1.75 sq mi (4.52 km^{2})

Population (2013)
  - Total: 270
  - Density: 150/sq mi (60/km^{2})
- Time zone: UTC+1 (CET)
  - Summer (DST): UTC+2 (CEST)

Gusti Grab is a village in the municipality of Busovača, Bosnia and Herzegovina.

== Demographics ==
According to the 2013 census, its population was 270.

Ethnicity in 2013
Ethnicity	Number	Percentage
Croats	138	51.1%
Bosniaks	131	48.5%
other/undeclared	1	0.4%
Total	270	100%
