= Buselji =

- Village
- Location within Bosnia and Herzegovina
- Coordinates: 44°05′42″N 17°51′32″E
- Country: Bosnia and Herzegovina
- Entity: Federation of Bosnia and Herzegovina
- Canton: Central Bosnia
- Municipality: Busovača

Area
  - Total: 2.45 sq mi (6.35 km^{2})

Population (2013)
  - Total: 950
  - Density: 390/sq mi (150/km^{2})
- Time zone: UTC+1 (CET)
  - Summer (DST): UTC+2 (CEST)

Buselji is a village in the municipality of Busovača, Bosnia and Herzegovina.

== Demographics ==
According to the 2013 census, its population was 950.

Ethnicity in 2013
Ethnicity	Number	Percentage
Croats	691	72.7%
Bosniaks	253	26.6%
Serbs	4	0.4%
other/undeclared	2	0.2%
Total	950	100%
