= Oselište =

- Village
- Location within Bosnia and Herzegovina
- Coordinates: 44°03′23″N 17°57′51″E
- Country: Bosnia and Herzegovina
- Entity: Federation of Bosnia and Herzegovina
- Canton: Central Bosnia
- Municipality: Busovača

Area
  - Total: 1.36 sq mi (3.53 km^{2})

Population (2013)
  - Total: 107
  - Density: 78.5/sq mi (30.3/km^{2})
- Time zone: UTC+1 (CET)
  - Summer (DST): UTC+2 (CEST)

Oselište is a village in the municipality of Busovača, Bosnia and Herzegovina.

== Demographics ==
According to the 2013 census, its population was 107.

Ethnicity in 2013
Ethnicity	Number	Percentage
Croats	80	74.8%
Bosniaks	25	23.4%
other/undeclared	2	1.9%
Total	107	100%
