= Merdani =

- Village
- Location within Bosnia and Herzegovina
- Coordinates: 44°08′N 17°55′E
- Country: Bosnia and Herzegovina
- Entity: Federation of Bosnia and Herzegovina
- Canton: Central Bosnia
- Municipality: Busovača

Area
  - Total: 0.56 sq mi (1.46 km^{2})

Population (2013)
  - Total: 271
  - Density: 481/sq mi (186/km^{2})
- Time zone: UTC+1 (CET)
  - Summer (DST): UTC+2 (CEST)

Merdani is a village in the municipality of Busovača, Bosnia and Herzegovina.

== Demographics ==
According to the 2013 census, its population was 271.

Ethnicity in 2013
Ethnicity	Number	Percentage
Bosniaks	269	99.3%
other/undeclared	2	0.7%
Total	271	100%
