= Mašići, Novo Goražde =

Coordinates: 43.6786°N 19.0428°E

Mašići Машићи
- Village
- Interactive map of Mašići
- Country: Bosnia and Herzegovina
- Republic: Republika Srpska
- Municipality: Novo Goražde
- Time zone: UTC+1 (CET)
  - Summer (DST): UTC+2 (CEST)

Mašići is a village in the municipality of Novo Goražde, Republika Srpska, Bosnia and Herzegovina.
