= Karauzovići =

Karauzovići Караузовићи
- Village
- Location within Bosnia and Herzegovina
- Coordinates: 43°33′34″N 18°56′56″E
- Country: Bosnia and Herzegovina
- Entity: Republika Srpska; Federation of Bosnia and Herzegovina
- Region Canton: East Sarajevo; Bosnian-Podrinje Goražde
- Municipality: Novo Goražde; Goražde

Area
  - Total: 0.93 sq mi (2.42 km^{2})

Population (2013)
  - Total: 16
  - Density: 17/sq mi (6.6/km^{2})
- Time zone: UTC+1 (CET)
  - Summer (DST): UTC+2 (CEST)

Karauzovići (Cyrillic: Караузовићи) is a village in the municipalities of Novo Goražde, Republika Srpska and Goražde, Bosnia and Herzegovina.

== Demographics ==
According to the 2013 census, its population was 16, with 9 of them living in the Novo Goražde part, and 7 in the Goražde part.

Ethnicity in 2013
Ethnicity	Number	Percentage
Bosniaks	10	62.5%
Serbs	6	37.5%
Total	16	100%
