= Dolac, Busovača =

Dolac
- Village
- Location within Bosnia and Herzegovina
- Coordinates: 44°05′11″N 17°59′24″E
- Country: Bosnia and Herzegovina
- Entity: Federation of Bosnia and Herzegovina
- Canton: Central Bosnia
- Municipality: Busovača

Area
  - Total: 0.66 sq mi (1.71 km^{2})

Population (2013)
  - Total: 108
  - Density: 164/sq mi (63.2/km^{2})
- Time zone: UTC+1 (CET)
  - Summer (DST): UTC+2 (CEST)

Dolac is a village in the municipality of Busovača, Bosnia and Herzegovina.

== Demographics ==
According to the 2013 census, its population was 108, all Bosniaks.
