= Podstijena =

- Village
- Location within Bosnia and Herzegovina
- Coordinates: 44°02′02″N 17°55′17″E
- Country: Bosnia and Herzegovina
- Entity: Federation of Bosnia and Herzegovina
- Canton: Central Bosnia
- Municipality: Busovača

Area
  - Total: 0.59 sq mi (1.52 km^{2})

Population (2013)
  - Total: 293
  - Density: 499/sq mi (193/km^{2})
- Time zone: UTC+1 (CET)
  - Summer (DST): UTC+2 (CEST)

Podstijena is a village in the municipality of Busovača, Bosnia and Herzegovina.

== Demographics ==
According to the 2013 census, its population was 293.

Ethnicity in 2013
Ethnicity	Number	Percentage
Bosniaks	283	96.6%
other/undeclared	10	3.4%
Total	293	100%
