= Turići =

- Village
- Location within Bosnia and Herzegovina
- Country: Bosnia and Herzegovina
- Entity: Federation of Bosnia and Herzegovina
- Canton: Central Bosnia
- Municipality: Busovača

Area
  - Total: 0.86 sq mi (2.22 km^{2})

Population (2013)
  - Total: 230
  - Density: 270/sq mi (100/km^{2})
- Time zone: UTC+1 (CET)
  - Summer (DST): UTC+2 (CEST)

Turići is a village in the municipality of Busovača, Bosnia and Herzegovina.

== Demographics ==
According to the 2013 census, its population was 230.

Ethnicity in 2013
Ethnicity	Number	Percentage
Bosniaks	225	97.8%
Croats	5	2.2%
Total	230	100%
