= Bare, Busovača =

Bare
- Village
- Location within Bosnia and Herzegovina
- Coordinates: 44°07′04″N 17°50′50″E
- Country: Bosnia and Herzegovina
- Entity: Federation of Bosnia and Herzegovina
- Canton: Central Bosnia
- Municipality: Busovača

Area
  - Total: 2.29 sq mi (5.92 km^{2})

Population (2013)
  - Total: 383
  - Density: 168/sq mi (64.7/km^{2})
- Time zone: UTC+1 (CET)
  - Summer (DST): UTC+2 (CEST)

Bare is a village in the municipality of Busovača, Bosnia and Herzegovina.

== Demographics ==
According to the 2013 census, its population was 383.

Ethnicity in 2013
| Ethnicity | Number | Percentage |
|---|---|---|
| Croats | 360 | 94.0% |
| Bosniaks | 16 | 4.2% |
| Serbs | 4 | 1.0% |
| other/undeclared | 3 | 0.8% |
| Total | 383 | 100% |
