= Polje, Busovača =

Polje
- Village
- Location within Bosnia and Herzegovina
- Coordinates: 44°04′55″N 17°54′05″E
- Country: Bosnia and Herzegovina
- Entity: Federation of Bosnia and Herzegovina
- Canton: Central Bosnia
- Municipality: Busovača

Area
  - Total: 0.79 sq mi (2.04 km^{2})

Population (2013)
  - Total: 750
  - Density: 950/sq mi (370/km^{2})
- Time zone: UTC+1 (CET)
  - Summer (DST): UTC+2 (CEST)

Polje is a village in the municipality of Busovača, Bosnia and Herzegovina.

== Name ==
The name of this village means "field" in the native language

== Demographics ==
According to the 2013 census, its population was 750.

Ethnicity in 2013
Ethnicity	Number	Percentage
Croats	744	99.2%
Serbs	6	0.8%
Total	750	100%
