= Kopači (Novo Goražde) =

Kopači Копачи
- Village
- Interactive map of Kopači
- Coordinates: 43.6781°N 19.0294°E
- Country: Bosnia and Herzegovina
- Entity: Republika Srpska
- Municipality: Novo Goražde
- Elevation: 348 m (1,142 ft)

Population (2013)
  - Total: 146
- Time zone: UTC+1 (CET)
  - Summer (DST): UTC+2 (CEST)

Kopači (Cyrillic: Копачи) is a village in the municipality of Novo Goražde, Republika Srpska, Bosnia and Herzegovina. According to the 2013 census, the village has 146 inhabitants.
