= Radijevići =

Radijevići Радијевићи
- Village
- Location within Bosnia and Herzegovina
- Coordinates: 43°38′27″N 19°01′03″E
- Country: Bosnia and Herzegovina
- Entity: Federation of Bosnia and Herzegovina
- Region Canton: East Sarajevo; Bosnian-Podrinje Goražde
- Municipality: Novo Goražde; Goražde

Area
  - Total: 0.50 sq mi (1.29 km^{2})

Population (2013)
  - Total: 2
  - Density: 4.0/sq mi (1.6/km^{2})
- Time zone: UTC+1 (CET)
  - Summer (DST): UTC+2 (CEST)

Radijevići (Cyrillic: Радијевићи) is a village in the municipalities of Novo Goražde, Republika Srpska, and Goražde, Bosnia and Herzegovina.

== Demographics ==
According to the 2013 census, its population was 2 Bosniaks, living in the Novo Goražde part, with no one living in the Goražde part.
