= Hrid (Novo Goražde) =

Coordinates: 43.7128°N 18.9733°E

Hrid Хрид
- Village
- Interactive map of Hrid
- Country: Bosnia and Herzegovina
- Entity: Republika Srpska
- Municipality: Novo Goražde

Population (1991)
  - Total: 24
- Time zone: UTC+1 (CET)
  - Summer (DST): UTC+2 (CEST)

Hrid (Cyrillic: Хрид) is a village in the municipality of Novo Goražde, Republika Srpska, Bosnia and Herzegovina.
