= Bašabulići =

Coordinates: 43°36′26″N 19°00′35″E

Bašabulići Башабулићи
- Village
- Interactive map of Bašabulići
- Country: Bosnia and Herzegovina
- Entity: Republika Srpska
- Municipality: Novo Goražde

Population
  - Total: 70
- Time zone: UTC+1 (CET)
  - Summer (DST): UTC+2 (CEST)

Bašabulići (Cyrillic: Башабулићи) is a village in the municipality of Novo Goražde, Republika Srpska, Bosnia and Herzegovina.
