= Bučje (Novo Goražde) =

- Village
- Location within Bosnia and Herzegovina
- Country: Bosnia and Herzegovina
- Entity: Republika Srpska; Federation of Bosnia and Herzegovina
- Region Canton: East Sarajevo; Bosnian-Podrinje Goražde
- Municipality: Novo Goražde; Goražde

Area
  - Total: 0.76 sq mi (1.97 km^{2})
- Elevation: 1,890 ft (576 m)

Population (2013)
  - Total: 23
  - Density: 30/sq mi (12/km^{2})
- Time zone: UTC+1 (CET)
  - Summer (DST): UTC+2 (CEST)

Bučje is a village in the municipalities of Novo Goražde, Republika Srpska and Goražde, Bosnia and Herzegovina.

== Demographics ==
According to the 2013 census, its population was 23, all of them living in the Novo Goražde part, thus none in the Goražde part.

Ethnicity in 2013
Ethnicity	Number	Percentage
Serbs	13	56.5%
Bosniaks	10	43.5%
Total	23	100%
