= Nezirovići =

- Village
- Location within Bosnia and Herzegovina
- Coordinates: 44°05′N 17°56′E
- Country: Bosnia and Herzegovina
- Entity: Federation of Bosnia and Herzegovina
- Canton: Central Bosnia
- Municipality: Busovača

Area
  - Total: 0.35 sq mi (0.91 km^{2})

Population (2013)
  - Total: 135
  - Density: 380/sq mi (150/km^{2})
- Time zone: UTC+1 (CET)
  - Summer (DST): UTC+2 (CEST)

Nezirovići is a village in the municipality of Busovača, Bosnia and Herzegovina.

== Demographics ==
According to the 2013 census, its population was 135.

Ethnicity in 2013
Ethnicity	Number	Percentage
Bosniaks	111	82.2%
Croats	18	13.3%
other/undeclared	6	4.4%
Total	135	100%
