= Donja Rovna =

- Village
- Location within Bosnia and Herzegovina
- Coordinates: 44°08′N 17°50′E
- Country: Bosnia and Herzegovina
- Entity: Federation of Bosnia and Herzegovina
- Canton: Central Bosnia
- Municipality: Busovača

Area
  - Total: 1.06 sq mi (2.74 km^{2})

Population (2013)
  - Total: 239
  - Density: 226/sq mi (87.2/km^{2})
- Time zone: UTC+1 (CET)
  - Summer (DST): UTC+2 (CEST)

Donja Rovna is a village in the municipality of Busovača, Bosnia and Herzegovina.

== Demographics ==
According to the 2013 census, its population was 239.

Ethnicity in 2013
Ethnicity	Number	Percentage
Croats	200	83.7%
Bosniaks	35	14.6%
Serbs	4	1.7%
Total	239	100%
