= Žigovi =

- Village
- Location within Bosnia and Herzegovina
- Coordinates: 43°36′N 18°53′E
- Country: Bosnia and Herzegovina
- Entity: Federation of Bosnia and Herzegovina
- Region Canton: East Sarajevo; Bosnian-Podrinje Goražde
- Municipality: Novo Goražde; Goražde

Area
  - Total: 1.32 sq mi (3.41 km^{2})

Population (2013)
  - Total: 20
  - Density: 15/sq mi (5.9/km^{2})
- Time zone: UTC+1 (CET)
  - Summer (DST): UTC+2 (CEST)

Žigovi is a village in the municipalities of Novo Goražde, Republika Srpska and Goražde, Bosnia and Herzegovina.

== Demographics ==
According to the 2013 census, its population was 20, all Bosniaks, with 12 living in the Novo Goražde part and 8 in the Goražde part.
