= Kovačevac, Busovača =

Kovačevac
- Village
- Location within Bosnia and Herzegovina
- Coordinates: 44°06′59″N 17°49′55″E
- Country: Bosnia and Herzegovina
- Entity: Federation of Bosnia and Herzegovina
- Canton: Central Bosnia
- Municipality: Busovača

Area
  - Total: 0.74 sq mi (1.91 km^{2})

Population (2013)
  - Total: 86
  - Density: 120/sq mi (45/km^{2})
- Time zone: UTC+1 (CET)
  - Summer (DST): UTC+2 (CEST)

Kovačevac is a village in the municipality of Busovača, Bosnia and Herzegovina.

== Demographics ==
According to the 2013 census, its population was 86.

Ethnicity in 2013
Ethnicity	Number	Percentage
Bosniaks	82	95.3%
Croats	3	3.5%
other/undeclared	1	1.2%
Total	86	100%
