= Donje Selo (Novo Goražde) =

Donje Selo Доње Село
- Village
- Location within Bosnia and Herzegovina
- Coordinates: 43°36′32″N 18°55′39″E
- Country: Bosnia and Herzegovina
- Entity: Republika Srpska; Federation of Bosnia and Herzegovina
- Region Canton: East Sarajevo; Bosnian-Podrinje Goražde
- Municipality: Novo Goražde; Goražde

Area
  - Total: 0.42 sq mi (1.10 km^{2})

Population (2013)
  - Total: 15
  - Density: 35/sq mi (14/km^{2})
- Time zone: UTC+1 (CET)
  - Summer (DST): UTC+2 (CEST)

Donje Selo (Cyrillic: Доње Село) is a village in the municipalities of Novo Goražde, Republika Srpska and Goražde, Bosnia and Herzegovina.

== Demographics ==
According to the 2013 census, its population was 15, with 3 of them living in the Goražde part and 5 in the Novo Goražde part.

Ethnicity in 2013
Ethnicity	Number	Percentage
Serbs	12	80.0%
Bosniaks	3	20.0%
Total	15	100%
