= Bogdanići =

Bogdanići Богданићи
- Village
- Location within Bosnia and Herzegovina
- Coordinates: 43°42′06″N 19°04′40″E
- Country: Bosnia and Herzegovina
- Entity: Republika Srpska
- Municipality: Novo Goražde

Population
  - Total: 65
- Time zone: UTC+1 (CET)
  - Summer (DST): UTC+2 (CEST)

Bogdanići (Cyrillic: Богданићи) is a village in the municipality of Novo Goražde, Republika Srpska, Bosnia and Herzegovina.
