= Skradno =

- Village
- Location within Bosnia and Herzegovina
- Coordinates: 44°07′N 17°53′E
- Country: Bosnia and Herzegovina
- Entity: Federation of Bosnia and Herzegovina
- Canton: Central Bosnia
- Municipality: Busovača

Area
  - Total: 1.35 sq mi (3.50 km^{2})

Population (2013)
  - Total: 609
  - Density: 451/sq mi (174/km^{2})
- Time zone: UTC+1 (CET)
  - Summer (DST): UTC+2 (CEST)

Skradno is a village in the municipality of Busovača, Bosnia and Herzegovina.

== Demographics ==
According to the 2013 census, its population was 609.

Ethnicity in 2013
Ethnicity	Number	Percentage
Croats	447	73.4%
Bosniaks	152	25.0%
Serbs	3	0.5%
other/undeclared	7	1.1%
Total	609	100%
