= Pribjenovići =

Bosnian village

Pribjenovići Прибјеновићи
- Village
- Location within Bosnia and Herzegovina
- Coordinates: 43°36′29″N 19°01′40″E
- Country: Bosnia and Herzegovina
- Entity: Republika Srpska
- Municipality: Novo Goražde
- Time zone: UTC+1 (CET)
  - Summer (DST): UTC+2 (CEST)

Pribjenovići (Cyrillic: Прибјеновићи) is a village in the municipality of Novo Goražde, Republika Srpska, Bosnia and Herzegovina.
