= Mihaljevići, Busovača =

Mihaljevići
- Village
- Location within Bosnia and Herzegovina
- Coordinates: 44°05′07″N 17°55′59″E
- Country: Bosnia and Herzegovina
- Entity: Federation of Bosnia and Herzegovina
- Canton: Central Bosnia
- Municipality: Busovača

Area
  - Total: 0.19 sq mi (0.48 km^{2})

Population (2013)
  - Total: 356
  - Density: 1,900/sq mi (740/km^{2})
- Time zone: UTC+1 (CET)
  - Summer (DST): UTC+2 (CEST)

Mihaljevići is a village in the municipality of Busovača, Bosnia and Herzegovina.

== Demographics ==
According to the 2013 census, its population was 356.

Ethnicity in 2013
Ethnicity	Number	Percentage
Bosniaks	355	99.7%
Serbs	1	0.3%
Total	356	100%
