= Hozanovići =

- Village
- Location within Bosnia and Herzegovina
- Coordinates: 44°05′N 17°57′E
- Country: Bosnia and Herzegovina
- Entity: Federation of Bosnia and Herzegovina
- Canton: Central Bosnia
- Municipality: Busovača

Area
  - Total: 0.47 sq mi (1.22 km^{2})

Population (2013)
  - Total: 351
  - Density: 745/sq mi (288/km^{2})
- Time zone: UTC+1 (CET)
  - Summer (DST): UTC+2 (CEST)

Hozanovići is a village in the municipality of Busovača, Bosnia and Herzegovina.

== Demographics ==
According to the 2013 census, its population was 351.

Ethnicity in 2013
Ethnicity	Number	Percentage
Bosniaks	349	99.4%
other/undeclared	2	0.6%
Total	351	100%
