= Putiš =

- Village
- Location within Bosnia and Herzegovina
- Coordinates: 44°09′N 17°54′E
- Country: Bosnia and Herzegovina
- Entity: Federation of Bosnia and Herzegovina
- Canton: Central Bosnia
- Municipality: Busovača

Area
  - Total: 1.30 sq mi (3.36 km^{2})

Population (2013)
  - Total: 498
  - Density: 384/sq mi (148/km^{2})
- Time zone: UTC+1 (CET)
  - Summer (DST): UTC+2 (CEST)

Putiš is a village in the municipality of Busovača, Bosnia and Herzegovina.

== Demographics ==
According to the 2013 census, its population was 498.

Ethnicity in 2013
Ethnicity	Number	Percentage
Bosniaks	418	83.9%
Croats	78	15.7%
Serbs	2	0.4%
Total	498	100%
