= Borova (Novo Goražde) =

Borova Борова
- Village
- Location within Bosnia and Herzegovina
- Coordinates: 43°40′N 19°05′E
- Country: Bosnia and Herzegovina
- Entity: Republika Srpska
- Municipality: Novo Goražde

Population
  - Total: 31
- Time zone: UTC+1 (CET)
  - Summer (DST): UTC+2 (CEST)

Borova (Cyrillic: Борова) is a village in the municipality of Novo Goražde, Republika Srpska, Bosnia and Herzegovina.
