= Podkozara Donja =

Podkozara Donja Подкозара Доња
- Village
- Location within Bosnia and Herzegovina
- Coordinates: 43°37′49″N 18°59′29″E
- Country: Bosnia and Herzegovina
- Entity: Federation of Bosnia and Herzegovina
- Region Canton: East Sarajevo; Bosnian-Podrinje Goražde
- Municipality: Novo Goražde; Goražde

Area
  - Total: 1.71 sq mi (4.42 km^{2})

Population (2013)
  - Total: 254
  - Density: 149/sq mi (57.5/km^{2})
- Time zone: UTC+1 (CET)
  - Summer (DST): UTC+2 (CEST)

Podkozara Donja (Cyrillic: Подкозара Доња) is a village in the municipality of Novo Goražde, Republika Srpska, Bosnia and Herzegovina.

== Demographics ==
According to the 2013 census, its population was 254, with 97 of them living in the Goražde part and 157 in the Novo Goražde part.

Ethnicity in 2013
Ethnicity	Number	Percentage
Serbs	241	94.9%
Bosniaks	11	4.3%
other/undeclared	2	0.8%
Total	254	100%
