= Krvavičići =

- Village
- Location within Bosnia and Herzegovina
- Coordinates: 44°05′N 17°56′E
- Country: Bosnia and Herzegovina
- Entity: Federation of Bosnia and Herzegovina
- Canton: Central Bosnia
- Municipality: Busovača

Area
  - Total: 0.31 sq mi (0.81 km^{2})

Population (2013)
  - Total: 96
  - Density: 310/sq mi (120/km^{2})
- Time zone: UTC+1 (CET)
  - Summer (DST): UTC+2 (CEST)

Krvavičići is a village in the municipality of Busovača, Bosnia and Herzegovina.

== Demographics ==
According to the 2013 census, its population was 96.

Ethnicity in 2013
Ethnicity	Number	Percentage
Bosniaks	95	99.0%
other/undeclared	1	1.0%
Total	96	100%
