= Vlahovići (Novo Goražde) =

Coordinates: 43.6672°N 19.0381°E

Vlahovići Влаховићи
- Village
- Interactive map of Vlahovići
- Country: Bosnia and Herzegovina
- Entity: Republika Srpska
- Municipality: Novo Goražde
- Time zone: UTC+1 (CET)
  - Summer (DST): UTC+2 (CEST)

Vlahovići (Cyrillic: Влаховићи) is a village in the municipality of Novo Goražde, Republika Srpska, Bosnia and Herzegovina.
