= Sopotnica (Novo Goražde) =

Sopotnica Сопотница
- Village
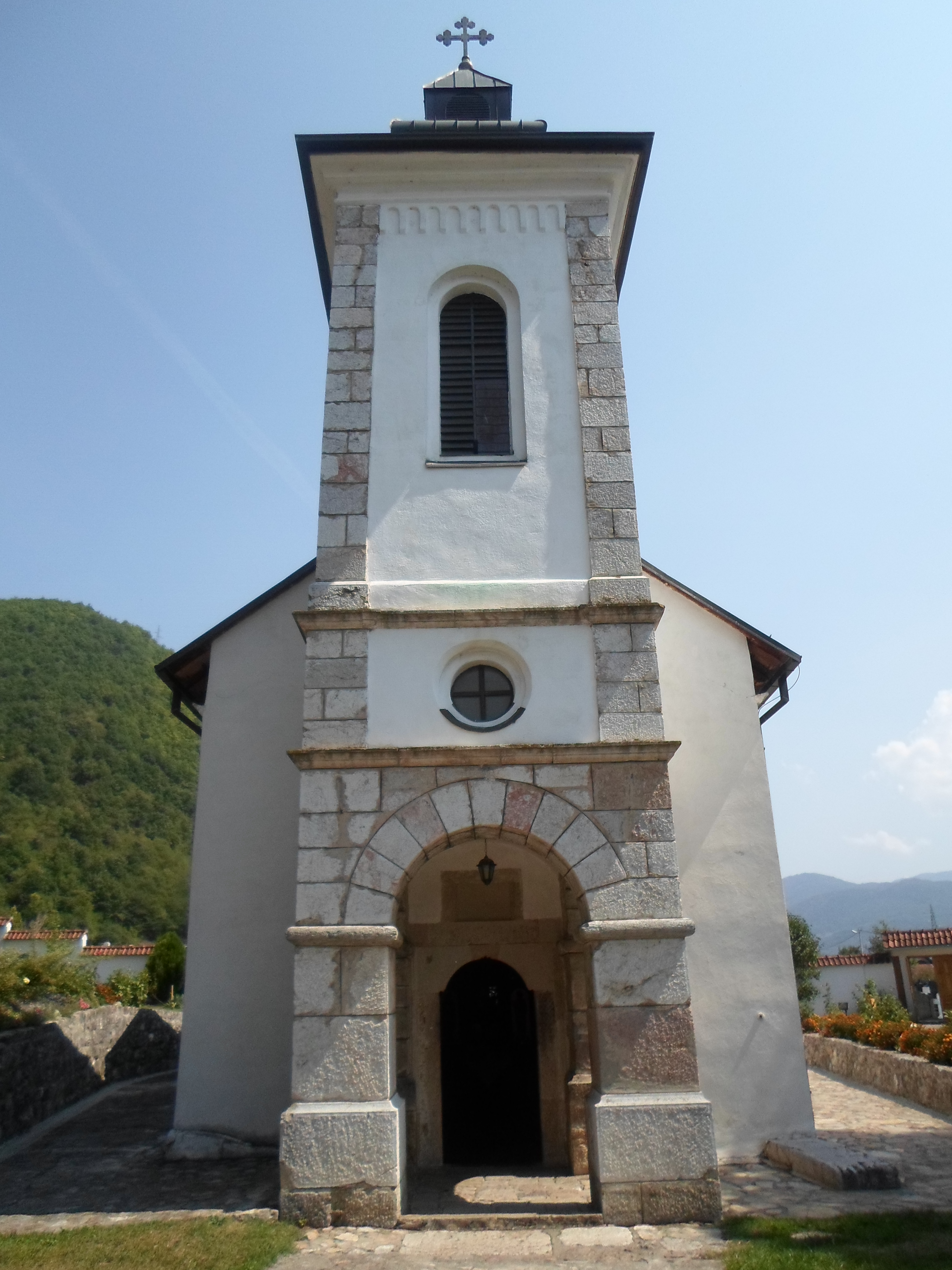
- Church of St. George in Sopotnica, Novo Goražde

- Location within Bosnia and Herzegovina
- Coordinates: 43.6828°N 19.0500°E
- Country: Bosnia and Herzegovina
- Entity: Federation of Bosnia and Herzegovina
- Region Canton: East Sarajevo; Bosnian-Podrinje Goražde
- Municipality: Novo Goražde; Goražde

Area
  - Total: 1.16 sq mi (3.01 km^{2})

Population (2013)
  - Total: 505
  - Density: 435/sq mi (168/km^{2})
- Time zone: UTC+1 (CET)
  - Summer (DST): UTC+2 (CEST)

Sopotnica (Serbian Cyrillic: Сопотница) is a village in the municipalities of Novo Goražde, Republika Srpska and Goražde, Bosnia and Herzegovina.

== Demographics ==
According to the 2013 census, its population was 505, with 488 of them living in the Novo Goražde part and 17 in the Goražde part.

Ethnicity in 2013
| Ethnicity | Number | Percentage |
|---|---|---|
| Serbs | 501 | 99.2% |
| Croats | 2 | 0.4% |
| other/undeclared | 2 | 0.4% |
| Total | 505 | 100% |
