= Seoca, Bosnia and Herzegovina =

Seoca Сеоца
- Village
- Location within Bosnia and Herzegovina
- Coordinates: 43°40′39″N 19°07′51″E
- Country: Bosnia and Herzegovina
- Entity: Republika Srpska
- Municipality: Novo Goražde

Population (2013)
  - Total: 7
- Time zone: UTC+1 (CET)
  - Summer (DST): UTC+2 (CEST)

Seoca (Serbian Cyrillic: Сеоца) is a village in the municipality of Novo Goražde, Republika Srpska, Bosnia and Herzegovina. According to the 2013 census, the village has 7 inhabitants.
