= Kostenik =

Kostenik Костеник
- Village
- Location within Bosnia and Herzegovina
- Coordinates: 43°41′34″N 19°02′05″E
- Country: Bosnia and Herzegovina
- Entity: Republika Srpska
- Municipality: Novo Goražde
- Time zone: UTC+1 (CET)
  - Summer (DST): UTC+2 (CEST)

Kostenik (Cyrillic: Костеник) is a village in the municipality of Novo Goražde, Republika Srpska, Bosnia and Herzegovina.
