= Milavice =

- Village
- Location within Bosnia and Herzegovina
- Coordinates: 44°05′N 17°56′E
- Country: Bosnia and Herzegovina
- Entity: Federation of Bosnia and Herzegovina
- Canton: Central Bosnia
- Municipality: Busovača

Area
  - Total: 0.46 sq mi (1.20 km^{2})

Population (2013)
  - Total: 105
  - Density: 227/sq mi (87.5/km^{2})
- Time zone: UTC+1 (CET)
  - Summer (DST): UTC+2 (CEST)

Milavice is a village in the municipality of Busovača, Bosnia and Herzegovina.

== Demographics ==
According to the 2013 census, its population was 105.

Ethnicity in 2013
| Ethnicity | Number | Percentage |
|---|---|---|
| Bosniaks | 96 | 91.4% |
| Croats | 7 | 6.7% |
| other/undeclared | 2 | 1.9% |
| Total | 105 | 100% |
