= Gornja Rovna =

- Village
- Location within Bosnia and Herzegovina
- Coordinates: 44°07′N 17°49′E
- Country: Bosnia and Herzegovina
- Entity: Federation of Bosnia and Herzegovina
- Canton: Central Bosnia
- Municipality: Busovača

Area
  - Total: 1.16 sq mi (3.00 km^{2})

Population (2013)
  - Total: 305
  - Density: 263/sq mi (102/km^{2})
- Time zone: UTC+1 (CET)
  - Summer (DST): UTC+2 (CEST)

Gornja Rovna is a village in the municipality of Busovača, Bosnia and Herzegovina.

== Demographics ==
According to the 2013 census, its population was 305.

Ethnicity in 2013
Ethnicity	Number	Percentage
Bosniaks	304	99.7%
other/undeclared	1	0.3%
Total	305	100%
