= Gradac, Novo Goražde =

Coordinates: 43.6808°N 19.0403°E

Gradac Градац
- Village
- Interactive map of Gradac
- Country: Bosnia and Herzegovina
- Entity: Republika Srpska
- Municipality: Novo Goražde

Population
  - Total: 145
- Time zone: UTC+1 (CET)
  - Summer (DST): UTC+2 (CEST)

Gradac (Cyrillic: Градац) is a village in the municipality of Novo Goražde, Republika Srpska, Bosnia and Herzegovina.
