= Podbare =

- Village
- Location within Bosnia and Herzegovina
- Coordinates: 44°04′54″N 17°57′55″E
- Country: Bosnia and Herzegovina
- Entity: Federation of Bosnia and Herzegovina
- Canton: Central Bosnia
- Municipality: Busovača

Area
  - Total: 0.45 sq mi (1.17 km^{2})

Population (2013)
  - Total: 136
  - Density: 301/sq mi (116/km^{2})
- Time zone: UTC+1 (CET)
  - Summer (DST): UTC+2 (CEST)

Podbare is a village in the municipality of Busovača, Bosnia and Herzegovina.

== Demographics ==
According to the 2013 census, its population was 136, all Bosniaks.
