= Slatina (Novo Goražde) =

Coordinates: 44.8300°N 17.2933°E

Slatina Слатина
- Village
- Interactive map of Slatina
- Country: Bosnia and Herzegovina
- Entity: Republika Srpska
- Municipality: Novo Goražde

Population (2013)
  - Total: 357
- Time zone: UTC+1 (CET)
  - Summer (DST): UTC+2 (CEST)

Slatina (Cyrillic: Слатина) is a village in the municipality of Novo Goražde, Republika Srpska, Bosnia and Herzegovina.
