= Podjele =

- Village
- Location within Bosnia and Herzegovina
- Coordinates: 44°07′29″N 17°54′03″E
- Country: Bosnia and Herzegovina
- Entity: Federation of Bosnia and Herzegovina
- Canton: Central Bosnia
- Municipality: Busovača

Area
  - Total: 1.12 sq mi (2.89 km^{2})

Population (2013)
  - Total: 81
  - Density: 73/sq mi (28/km^{2})
- Time zone: UTC+1 (CET)
  - Summer (DST): UTC+2 (CEST)

Podjele is a village in the municipality of Busovača, Bosnia and Herzegovina.

== Demographics ==
According to the 2013 census, its population was 81.

Ethnicity in 2013
Ethnicity	Number	Percentage
Croats	56	69.1%
Serbs	19	23.5%
Bosniaks	4	4.9%
other/undeclared	2	2.5%
Total	81	100%
