= Jelinak =

- Village
- Location within Bosnia and Herzegovina
- Coordinates: 44°09′N 17°53′E
- Country: Bosnia and Herzegovina
- Entity: Federation of Bosnia and Herzegovina
- Canton: Central Bosnia
- Municipality: Busovača

Area
  - Total: 1.17 sq mi (3.03 km^{2})

Population (2013)
  - Total: 186
  - Density: 159/sq mi (61.4/km^{2})
- Time zone: UTC+1 (CET)
  - Summer (DST): UTC+2 (CEST)

Jelinak is a village in the municipality of Busovača, Bosnia and Herzegovina.

== Demographics ==
According to the 2013 census, its population was 186.

Ethnicity in 2013
Ethnicity	Number	Percentage
Bosniaks	140	75.3%
Croats	44	23.7%
other/undeclared	2	1.1%
Total	186	100%
