= Solakovići, Busovača =

Solakovići
- Village
- Location within Bosnia and Herzegovina
- Coordinates: 44°06′01″N 17°55′28″E
- Country: Bosnia and Herzegovina
- Entity: Federation of Bosnia and Herzegovina
- Canton: Central Bosnia
- Municipality: Busovača

Area
  - Total: 1.21 sq mi (3.14 km^{2})

Population (2013)
  - Total: 448
  - Density: 370/sq mi (143/km^{2})
- Time zone: UTC+1 (CET)
  - Summer (DST): UTC+2 (CEST)

Solakovići is a village in the municipality of Busovača, Bosnia and Herzegovina.

== Demographics ==
According to the 2013 census, its population was 448.

Ethnicity in 2013
Ethnicity	Number	Percentage
Bosniaks	227	50.7%
Croats	220	49.1%
Serbs	1	0.2%
Total	448	100%
