= Dragolji =

Dragolji Драгољи
- Village
- Location within Bosnia and Herzegovina
- Coordinates: 43°36′N 18°57′E
- Country: Bosnia and Herzegovina
- Entity: Republika Srpska; Federation of Bosnia and Herzegovina
- Region Canton: East Sarajevo; Bosnian-Podrinje Goražde
- Municipality: Novo Goražde; Goražde

Area
  - Total: 0.68 sq mi (1.77 km^{2})

Population (2013)
  - Total: 8
  - Density: 12/sq mi (4.5/km^{2})
- Time zone: UTC+1 (CET)
  - Summer (DST): UTC+2 (CEST)

Dragolji (Cyrillic: Драгољи) is a village in the municipalities of Novo Goražde, Republika Srpska and Goražde, Bosnia and Herzegovina.

== Demographics ==
According to the 2013 census, its population was 8, all Bosniaks living in the Novo Goražde part, thus none living in the Goražde part.
