= Jazvine, Busovača =

Jazvine
- Village
- Location within Bosnia and Herzegovina
- Coordinates: 44°07′N 17°52′E
- Country: Bosnia and Herzegovina
- Entity: Federation of Bosnia and Herzegovina
- Canton: Central Bosnia
- Municipality: Busovača

Area
  - Total: 1.25 sq mi (3.24 km^{2})

Population (2013)
  - Total: 458
  - Density: 366/sq mi (141/km^{2})
- Time zone: UTC+1 (CET)
  - Summer (DST): UTC+2 (CEST)

Jazvine is a village in the municipality of Busovača, Bosnia and Herzegovina.

== Demographics ==
According to the 2013 census, its population was 458.

Ethnicity in 2013
Ethnicity	Number	Percentage
Croats	456	99.6%
Serbs	1	0.2%
other/undeclared	1	0.2%
Total	458	100%
