= Lončari, Busovača =

Lončari
- Village
- Location within Bosnia and Herzegovina
- Coordinates: 44°08′41″N 17°52′33″E
- Country: Bosnia and Herzegovina
- Entity: Federation of Bosnia and Herzegovina
- Canton: Central Bosnia
- Municipality: Busovača

Area
  - Total: 1.29 sq mi (3.33 km^{2})

Population (2013)
  - Total: 371
  - Density: 289/sq mi (111/km^{2})
- Time zone: UTC+1 (CET)
  - Summer (DST): UTC+2 (CEST)

Lončari is a village in the municipality of Busovača, Bosnia and Herzegovina.

== Demographics ==
According to the 2013 census, its population was 371.

Ethnicity in 2013
Ethnicity	Number	Percentage
Bosniaks	334	90.0%
Croats	34	9.2%
Serbs	1	0.3%
other/undeclared	2	0.5%
Total	371	100%
