= Kula, Busovača =

Kula
- Village
- Location within Bosnia and Herzegovina
- Coordinates: 44°06′03″N 17°53′24″E
- Country: Bosnia and Herzegovina
- Entity: Federation of Bosnia and Herzegovina
- Canton: Central Bosnia
- Municipality: Busovača

Area
  - Total: 1.34 sq mi (3.48 km^{2})

Population (2013)
  - Total: 336
  - Density: 250/sq mi (96.6/km^{2})
- Time zone: UTC+1 (CET)
  - Summer (DST): UTC+2 (CEST)

Kula (Busovača) is a village in the municipality of Busovača, Bosnia and Herzegovina.

== Demographics ==
According to the 2013 census, its population was 336.

Ethnicity in 2013
Ethnicity	Number	Percentage
Croats	263	78.3%
Bosniaks	64	19.0%
Serbs	2	0.6%
other/undeclared	7	2.1%
Total	336	100%
