= Prosje =

- Village
- Location within Bosnia and Herzegovina
- Coordinates: 44°03′50″N 17°55′09″E
- Country: Bosnia and Herzegovina
- Entity: Federation of Bosnia and Herzegovina
- Canton: Central Bosnia
- Municipality: Busovača

Area
  - Total: 1.52 sq mi (3.93 km^{2})

Population (2013)
  - Total: 41
  - Density: 27/sq mi (10/km^{2})
- Time zone: UTC+1 (CET)
  - Summer (DST): UTC+2 (CEST)

Prosje is a village in the municipality of Busovača, Bosnia and Herzegovina. The population of Prosje is 42 according to a 2013 census.

== Demographics ==
According to the 2013 census, its population was 41, all Croats.
