= Podkozara Gornja =

Podkozara Gornja Подкозара Горња
- Village
- Location within Bosnia and Herzegovina
- Coordinates: 43°36′28″N 19°01′16″E
- Country: Bosnia and Herzegovina
- Republic: Republika Srpska
- Municipality: Novo Goražde
- Time zone: UTC+1 (CET)
  - Summer (DST): UTC+2 (CEST)

Podkozara Gornja (Cyrillic: Подкозара Горња) is a village in the municipality of Novo Goražde, Republika Srpska, Bosnia and Herzegovina.
