= Radmilovići =

Radmilovići Радмиловићи
- Village
- Location within Bosnia and Herzegovina
- Coordinates: 43°35′N 18°58′E
- Country: Bosnia and Herzegovina
- Entity: Republika Srpska
- Municipality: Novo Goražde
- Time zone: UTC+1 (CET)
  - Summer (DST): UTC+2 (CEST)

Radmilovići (Cyrillic: Радмиловићи) is a village in the municipality of Novo Goražde, Republika Srpska, Bosnia and Herzegovina. According to the 2013 census, the village has no inhabitants.
