= Krašići (Novo Goražde) =

Coordinates: 43.5933°N 18.9467°E

Krašići Крашићи
- Village
- Interactive map of Krašići
- Country: Bosnia and Herzegovina
- Republic: Republika Srpska
- Municipality: Novo Goražde
- Time zone: UTC+1 (CET)
  - Summer (DST): UTC+2 (CEST)

Krašići (Cyrillic: Крашићи) is a village in the municipality of Novo Goražde, Republika Srpska, Bosnia and Herzegovina.
