= Jabuka (Novo Goražde) =

Coordinates: 43°43′09″N 18°58′11″E

Jabuka Јабука
- Village
- Interactive map of Jabuka
- Country: Bosnia and Herzegovina
- Republic: Republika Srpska
- Municipality: Novo Goražde
- Time zone: UTC+1 (CET)
  - Summer (DST): UTC+2 (CEST)

Jabuka (Cyrillic: Јабука) is a village in the municipality of Novo Goražde, Republika Srpska, Bosnia and Herzegovina.
