= Krčevine, Busovača =

Krčevine
- Village
- Location within Bosnia and Herzegovina
- Coordinates: 44°05′40″N 17°53′37″E
- Country: Bosnia and Herzegovina
- Entity: Federation of Bosnia and Herzegovina
- Canton: Central Bosnia
- Municipality: Busovača

Area
  - Total: 0.79 sq mi (2.05 km^{2})

Population (2013)
  - Total: 379
  - Density: 479/sq mi (185/km^{2})
- Time zone: UTC+1 (CET)
  - Summer (DST): UTC+2 (CEST)

Krčevine is a village in the municipality of Busovača, Bosnia and Herzegovina.

== Demographics ==
According to the 2013 census, its population was 379.

Ethnicity in 2013
Ethnicity	Number	Percentage
Croats	377	99.5%
other/undeclared	2	0.5%
Total	379	100%
