= Grablje, Busovača =

Grablje
- Village
- Location within Bosnia and Herzegovina
- Coordinates: 44°08′13″N 17°54′33″E
- Country: Bosnia and Herzegovina
- Entity: Federation of Bosnia and Herzegovina
- Canton: Central Bosnia
- Municipality: Busovača

Area
  - Total: 0.71 sq mi (1.85 km^{2})

Population (2013)
  - Total: 158
  - Density: 221/sq mi (85.4/km^{2})
- Time zone: UTC+1 (CET)
  - Summer (DST): UTC+2 (CEST)

Grablje is a village in the municipality of Busovača, Bosnia and Herzegovina.

== Demographics ==
According to the 2013 census, its population was 158, all Bosniaks.
