= Ljeskovik (Novo Goražde) =

Coordinates: 43°43′48″N 19°02′28″E

Ljeskovik Љесковик
- Village
- Interactive map of Ljeskovik
- Country: Bosnia and Herzegovina
- Republic: Republika Srpska
- Municipality: Novo Goražde
- Time zone: UTC+1 (CET)
  - Summer (DST): UTC+2 (CEST)

Ljeskovik (Cyrillic: Љесковик) is a village in the municipality of Novo Goražde, Republika Srpska, Bosnia and Herzegovina.
