= Hubjeri =

- Village
- Location within Bosnia and Herzegovina
- Coordinates: 43°40′42″N 18°59′50″E
- Country: Bosnia and Herzegovina
- Entity: Republika Srpska; Federation of Bosnia and Herzegovina
- Region Canton: East Sarajevo; Bosnian-Podrinje Goražde
- Municipality: Novo Goražde; Goražde

Area
  - Total: 0.37 sq mi (0.97 km^{2})
- Elevation: 1,150 ft (350 m)

Population (2013)
  - Total: 233
  - Density: 620/sq mi (240/km^{2})
- Time zone: UTC+1 (CET)
  - Summer (DST): UTC+2 (CEST)
- Postal code: 73000

Hubjeri is a village in the municipality of Novo Goražde, Republika Srpska, Bosnia and Herzegovina. According to the 2013 census, the village has a population of 80.

== Demographics ==
According to the 2013 census, its population was 233, with 153 of them living in the Goražde part and 80 in the Novo Goražde part.

Ethnicity in 2013
Ethnicity	Number	Percentage
Bosniaks	230	98.7%
other/undeclared	3	1.3%
Total	233	100%
