= Hajradinovići =

Hajradinovići Хајрадиновићи
- Village
- Location within Bosnia and Herzegovina
- Coordinates: 43°35′04″N 18°55′09″E
- Country: Bosnia and Herzegovina
- Entity: Republika Srpska
- Municipality: Novo Goražde

Population (1991)
  - Total: 13
- Time zone: UTC+1 (CET)
  - Summer (DST): UTC+2 (CEST)

Hajradinovići (Cyrillic: Хајрадиновићи) is a village in the municipality of Novo Goražde, Republika Srpska, Bosnia and Herzegovina.
