= Zarače =

- Village
- Location within Bosnia and Herzegovina
- Coordinates: 44°05′N 18°00′E
- Country: Bosnia and Herzegovina
- Entity: Federation of Bosnia and Herzegovina
- Canton: Central Bosnia
- Municipality: Busovača

Area
  - Total: 0.61 sq mi (1.57 km^{2})

Population (2013)
  - Total: 113
  - Density: 186/sq mi (72.0/km^{2})
- Time zone: UTC+1 (CET)
  - Summer (DST): UTC+2 (CEST)

Zarače is a village in the municipality of Busovača, Bosnia and Herzegovina.

== Demographics ==
According to the 2013 census, its population was 113.

Ethnicity in 2013
Ethnicity	Number	Percentage
Bosniaks	112	99.1%
other/undeclared	1	0.9%
Total	113	100%
