= Zubići =

- Village
- Location within Bosnia and Herzegovina
- Coordinates: 44.1532772°N 17.6555889°E
- Country: Bosnia and Herzegovina
- Entity: Federation of Bosnia and Herzegovina
- Canton: Central Bosnia
- Municipality: Novi Travnik

Area
  - Total: 0.36 sq mi (0.94 km^{2})

Population (2013)
  - Total: 131
  - Density: 360/sq mi (140/km^{2})
- Time zone: UTC+1 (CET)
  - Summer (DST): UTC+2 (CEST)

Zubići is a village in the municipality of Novi Travnik, Bosnia and Herzegovina.

== Demographics ==
According to the 2013 census, its population was 131.

Ethnicity in 2013
Ethnicity	Number	Percentage
Bosniaks	73	55.7%
Croats	58	44.3%
Total	131	100%
