= Hrušanj =

Hrušanj Хрушањ
- Village
- Location within Bosnia and Herzegovina
- Coordinates: 43°42′05″N 19°05′29″E
- Country: Bosnia and Herzegovina
- Republic: Republika Srpska
- Municipality: Novo Goražde
- Time zone: UTC+1 (CET)
  - Summer (DST): UTC+2 (CEST)

Hrušanj (Cyrillic: Хрушањ) is a village in the municipality of Novo Goražde, Republika Srpska, Bosnia and Herzegovina.
