= Zidine, Novo Goražde =

Zidine Зидине
- Village
- Location within Bosnia and Herzegovina
- Country: Bosnia and Herzegovina
- Entity: Republika Srpska
- Municipality: Novo Goražde
- Time zone: UTC+1 (CET)
  - Summer (DST): UTC+2 (CEST)

Zidine (Serbian Cyrillic: Зидине) is a village in the municipality of Novo Goražde, Republika Srpska, Bosnia and Herzegovina.
