= Žuželo =

Žuželo Жужело
- Village
- Location within Bosnia and Herzegovina
- Coordinates: 43°40′15″N 19°00′53″E
- Country: Bosnia and Herzegovina
- Entity: Federation of Bosnia and Herzegovina
- Region Canton: East Sarajevo; Bosnian-Podrinje Goražde
- Municipality: Novo Goražde; Goražde

Area
  - Total: 0.92 sq mi (2.38 km^{2})

Population (2013)
  - Total: 40
  - Density: 44/sq mi (17/km^{2})
- Time zone: UTC+1 (CET)
  - Summer (DST): UTC+2 (CEST)

Žuželo (Serbian Cyrillic: Жужело) is a village in the municipalities of Novo Goražde, Republika Srpska and Goražde, Bosnia and Herzegovina.

== Demographics ==
According to the 2013 census, its population was 40, all Bosniaks, with 3 of them living in the Goražde part and 37 in the Novo Goražde part.
