= Zabilje =

- Village
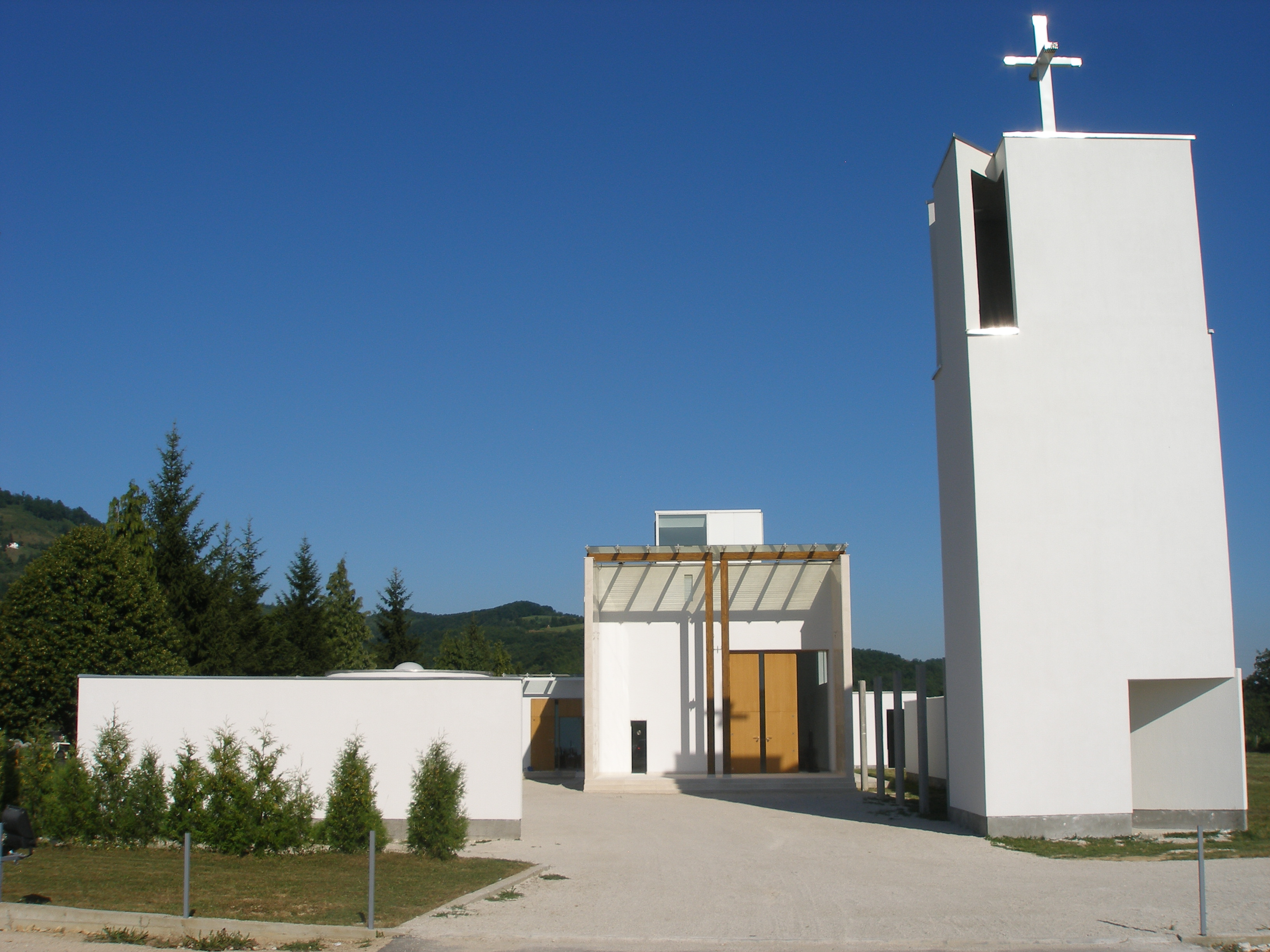

- Location within Bosnia and Herzegovina
- Coordinates: 44.1991237°N 17.7599952°E
- Country: Bosnia and Herzegovina
- Entity: Federation of Bosnia and Herzegovina
- Canton: Central Bosnia
- Municipality: Vitez

Area
  - Total: 0.89 sq mi (2.31 km^{2})

Population (2013)
  - Total: 1,225
  - Density: 1,370/sq mi (530/km^{2})
- Time zone: UTC+1 (CET)
  - Summer (DST): UTC+2 (CEST)

Zabilje is a village in the municipality of Vitez, Bosnia and Herzegovina.

== Demographics ==
According to the 2013 census, its population was 1,225.

Ethnicity in 2013
Ethnicity	Number	Percentage
Croats	1,207	98.5%
Serbs	7	0.2%
Bosniaks	3	0.6%
other/undeclared	8	0.7%
Total	1,225	100%
