= Ljeskovik (Srebrenica) =

Coordinates: 44.0944°N 19.3264°E

- Village
- Interactive map of Ljeskovik
- Country: Bosnia and Herzegovina
- Municipality: Srebrenica
- Time zone: UTC+1 (CET)
  - Summer (DST): UTC+2 (CEST)

Ljeskovik (Srebrenica) is a village in the municipality of Srebrenica, Bosnia and Herzegovina.
