= Novakovići =

Coordinates: 43°35′08″N 18°54′10″E

Novakovići Новаковићи
- Village
- Interactive map of Novakovići
- Country: Bosnia and Herzegovina
- Republic: Republika Srpska
- Municipality: Novo Goražde
- Time zone: UTC+1 (CET)
  - Summer (DST): UTC+2 (CEST)

Novakovići (Cyrillic: Новаковићи) is a village in the municipality of Novo Goražde, Republika Srpska, Bosnia and Herzegovina.
