= Hladila =

Hladila Хладила
- Village
- Interactive map of Hladila
- Location within Bosnia and Herzegovina
- Coordinates: 43°41′06″N 19°06′34″E
- Country: Bosnia and Herzegovina
- Entity: Republika Srpska
- Municipality: Novo Goražde

Population (1991)
  - Total: 93
- Time zone: UTC+1 (CET)
  - Summer (DST): UTC+2 (CEST)

Hladila (Cyrillic: Хладила) is a village in the municipality of Novo Goražde, Republika Srpska, Bosnia and Herzegovina.
