= Novo Goražde =

Municipality in Bosnia and Herzegovina

Novo Goražde Ново Горажде
- Municipality
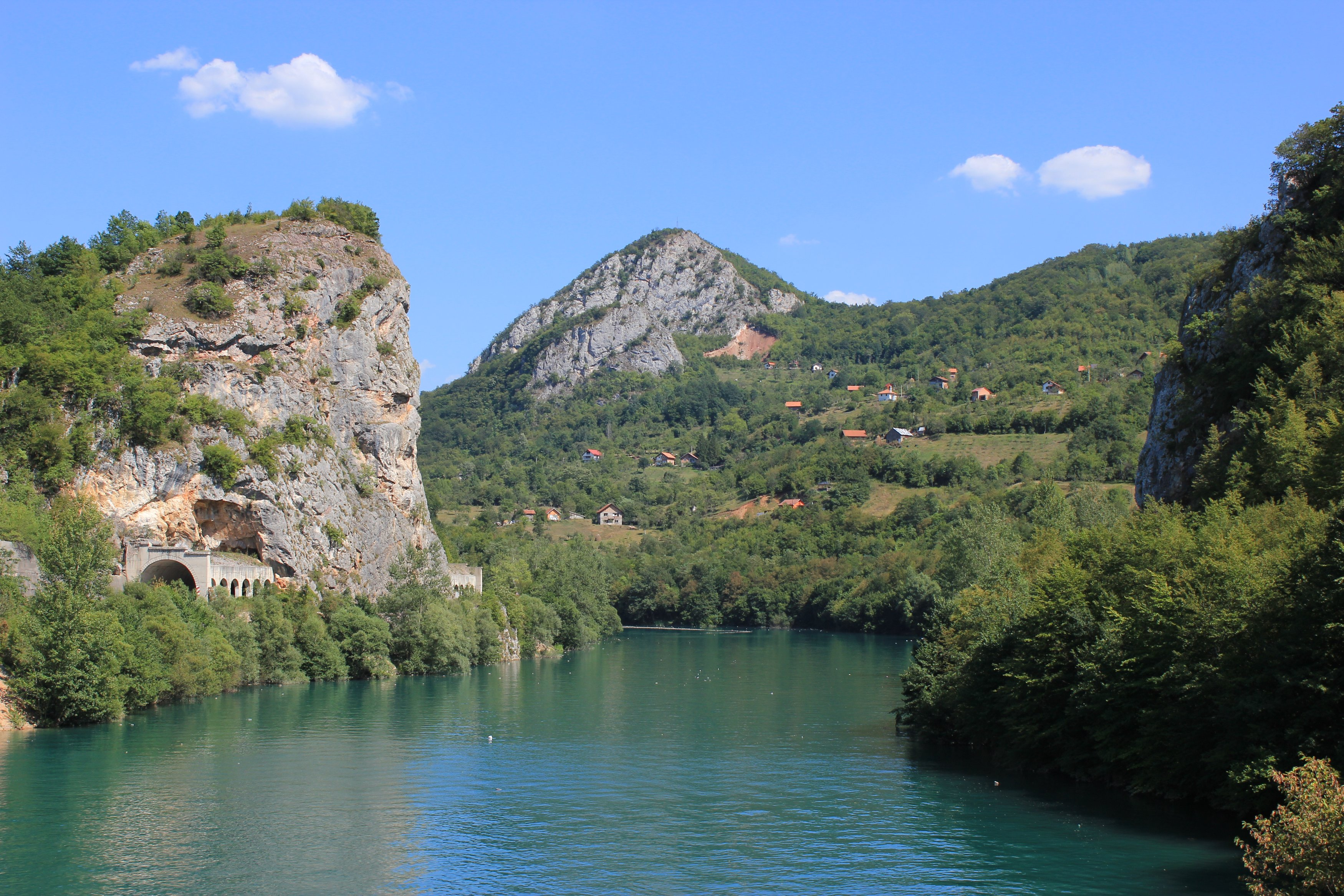
- The Drina in Ustiprača

- Location of Novo Goražde within Bosnia and Herzegovina

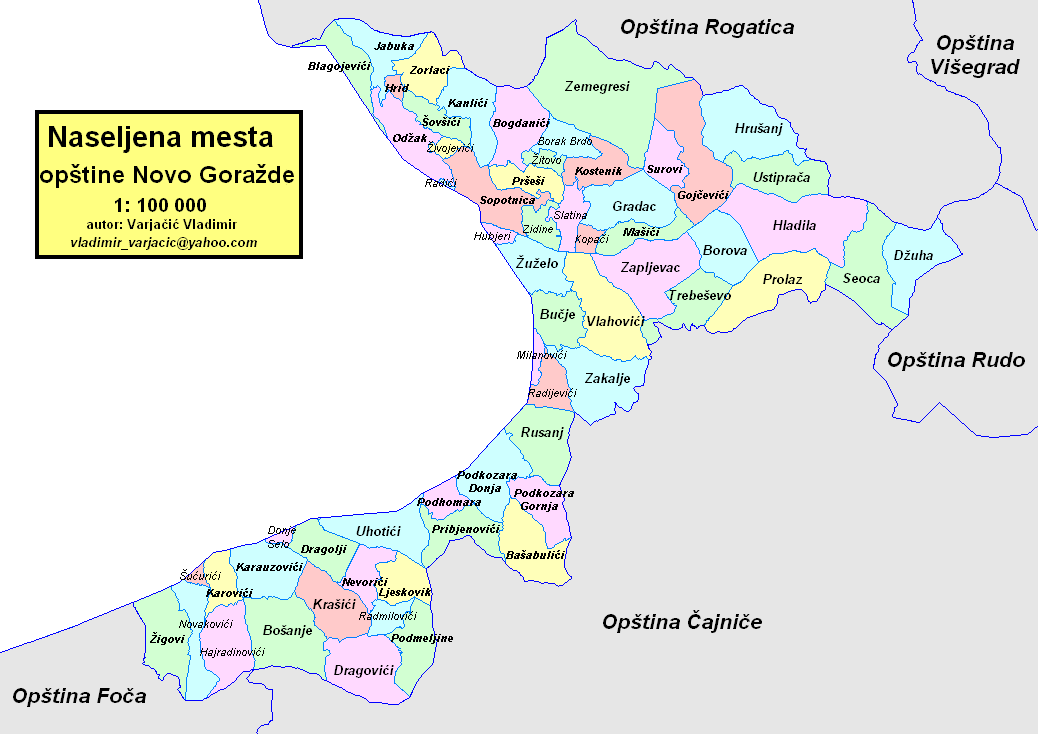
- Coordinates: 43.691°N 19.087°E
- Country: Bosnia and Herzegovina
- Entity: Republika Srpska
- Geographical region: Podrinje

Government
  - Municipal mayor: Mila Petković (SNSD)

Area
  - Total: 119 km^{2} (46 sq mi)

Population (2013 census)
  - Total: 3,117
  - Density: 26.2/km^{2} (67.8/sq mi)
- Time zone: UTC+1 (CET)
  - Summer (DST): UTC+2 (CEST)
- Area code: 58

Novo Goražde (Serbian Cyrillic: Ново Горажде, lit. 'New Goražde') is a municipality in Republika Srpska, Bosnia and Herzegovina. Its center is the village of Kopači. As of 2013, it has a population of 3,117 inhabitants.

== History ==
Goražde was mentioned in 1379 as a trade center and city settlement, with a connection to the Dubrovnik caravan trade, and as an open city in 1444. The medieval fortress Samobor built by Stjepan Vukčić Kosača located in the municipality. Duke of Saint Sava Stjepan Vukčić built the Church of St. George located in Donja Sopotnica.

In the period from 1519 to 1521, the Goražde printing house functioned in Novo Goražde, making it the second oldest in the Balkans.

The East Bosnian railway from Sarajevo to Uvac and Vardište was built through Ustiprača during Austro-Hungarian rule. The name of the railway station was Ustiprača-Goražde at that time. Construction of the line started in 1903. It was completed in 1906, using the 760 mm (2 ft 5 15/16 in) track gauge. With the cost of 75 million gold crowns, which approximately translates to 450 thousand gold crowns per kilometer, it was one of the most expensive railways in the world built by that time. The extensions were built from Uvac to Priboj, and from Vardište to Belgrade in 1928. In 1939, the railway station Ustiprača became a junction railway station to destinations of Sarajevo, Belgrade and Foča, after a branch line from Ustiprača to Foča had been built. The entire line was closed down in 1978, and dismantled afterwards.

In 1994, the municipality was created by dividing of the pre-existing municipality of Goražde between Republika Srpska and Federation of Bosnia and Herzegovina by the Dayton Agreement. The original name of the municipality was Srpsko Goražde ("Serbian Goražde"), but in 2004 the name was declared unconstitutional and was temporarily changed to Ustiprača. The current name was adopted one year later, in 2005.

== Demographics ==
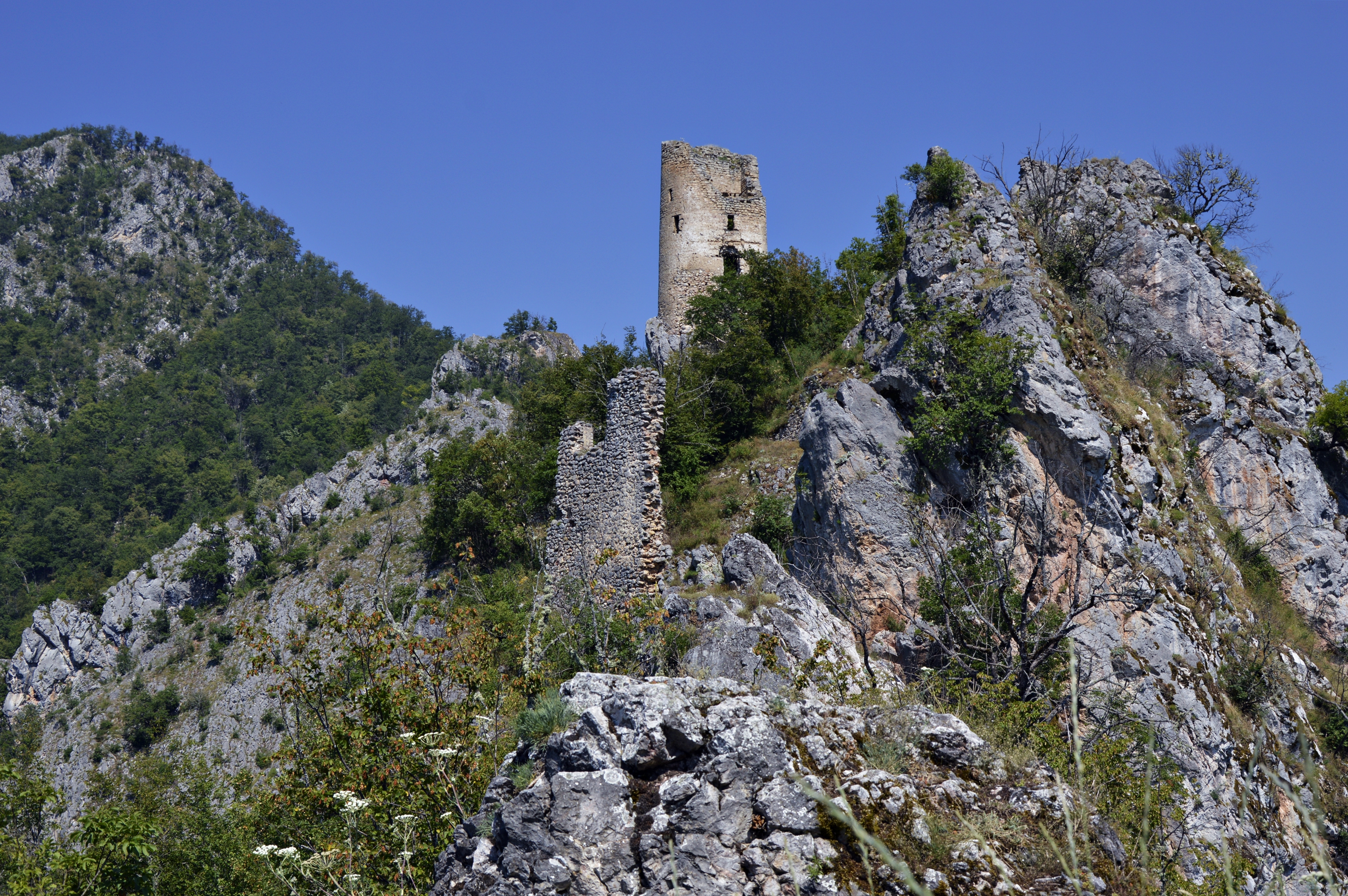
Samobor Fortress

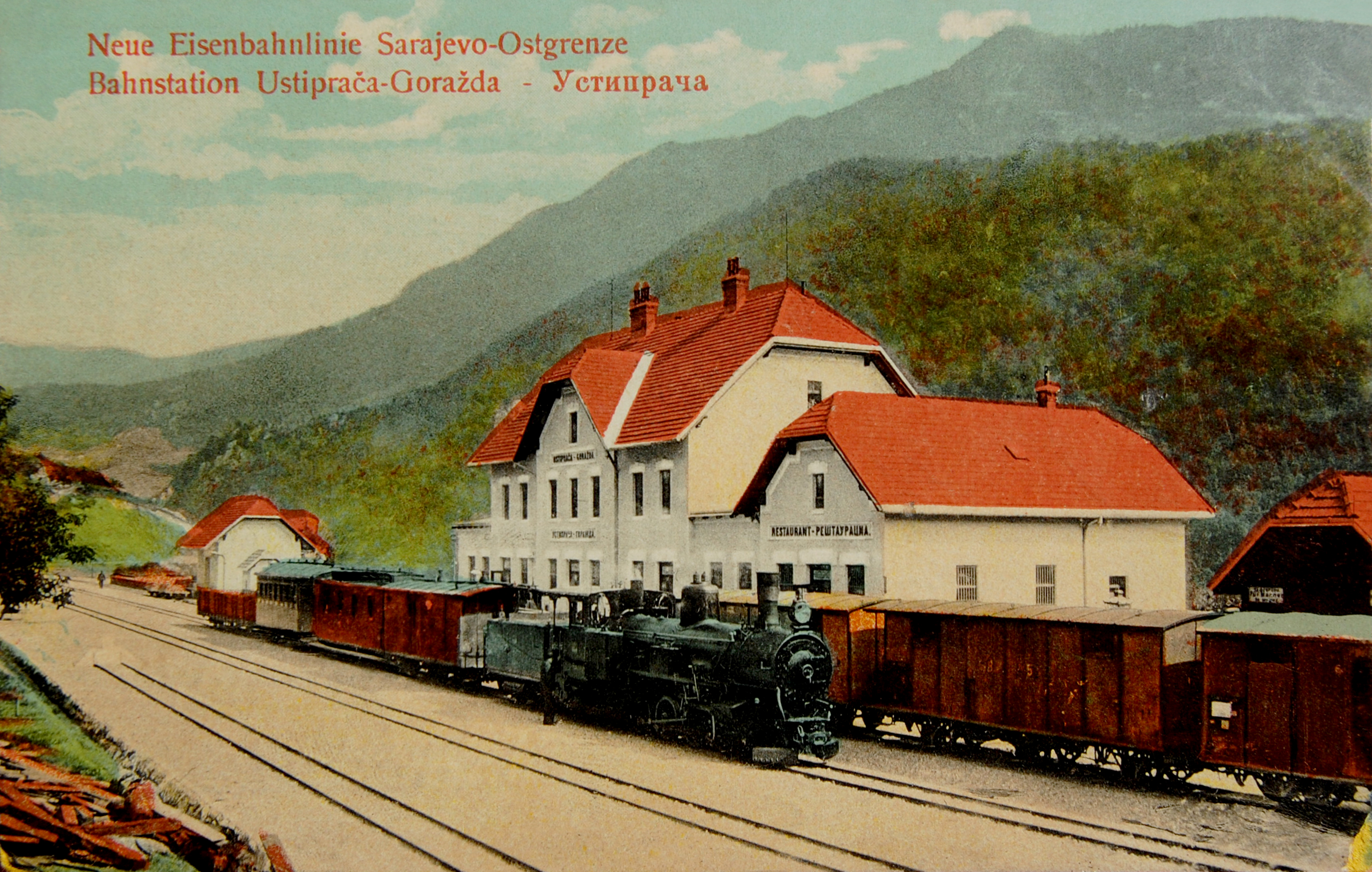
Ustiprača train station after opening in 1906

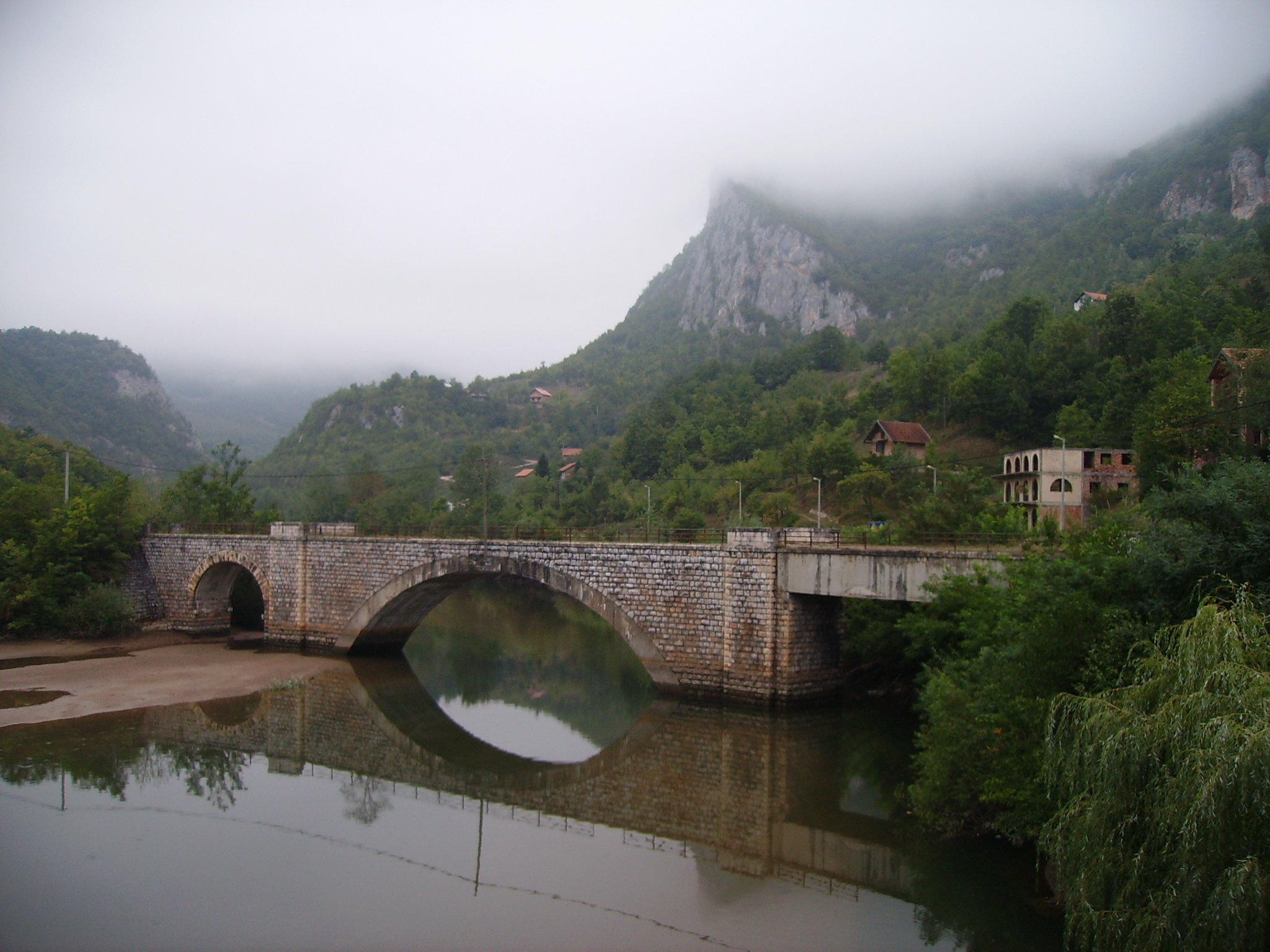
Old railway bridge in Ustiprača

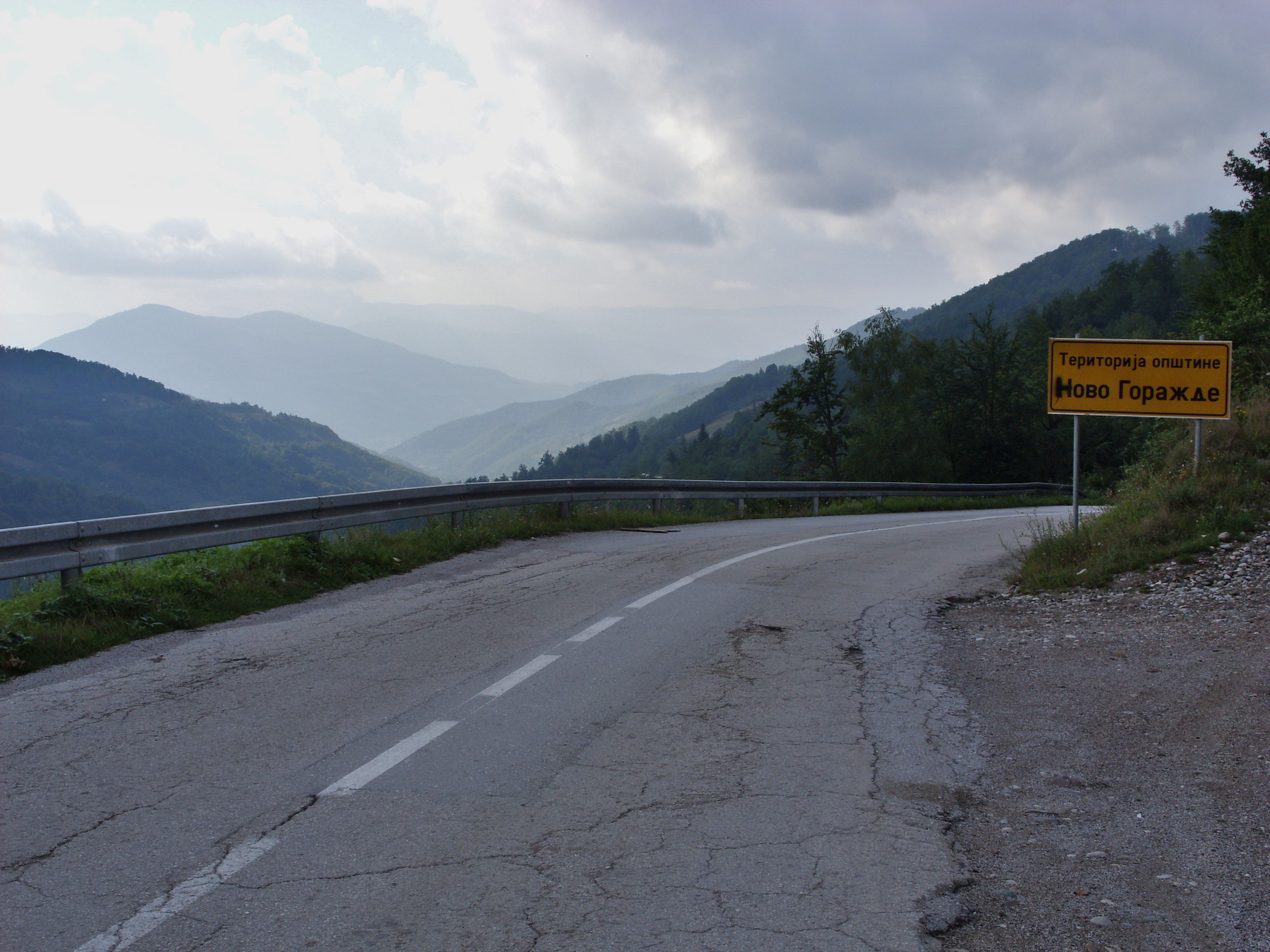
Road entrance to Novo Goražde

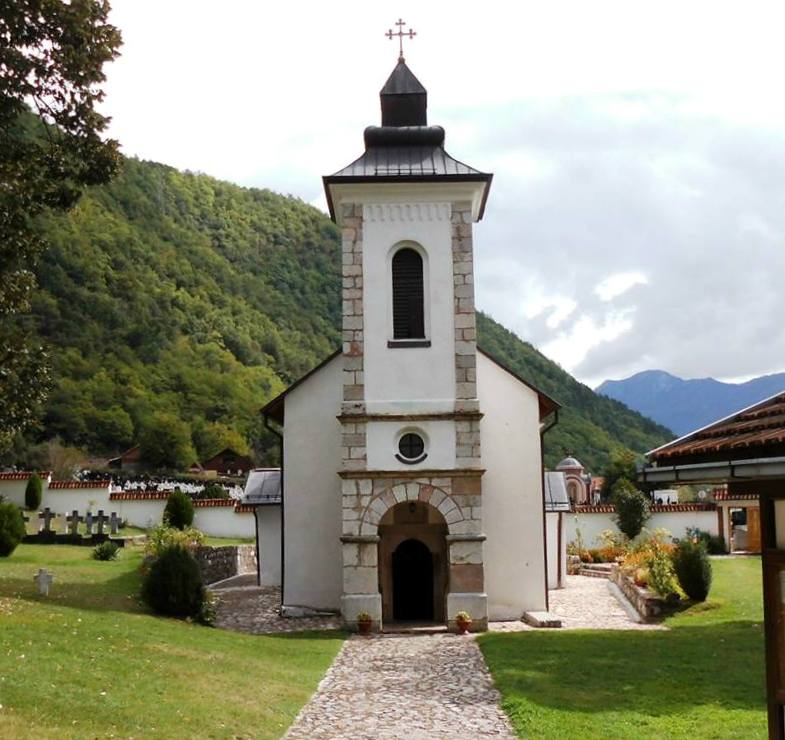
Church of Saint George in the village of Sopotnica, founded by Duke of Saint Sava Stjepan Vukčić Kosača where Goražde printing house functioned

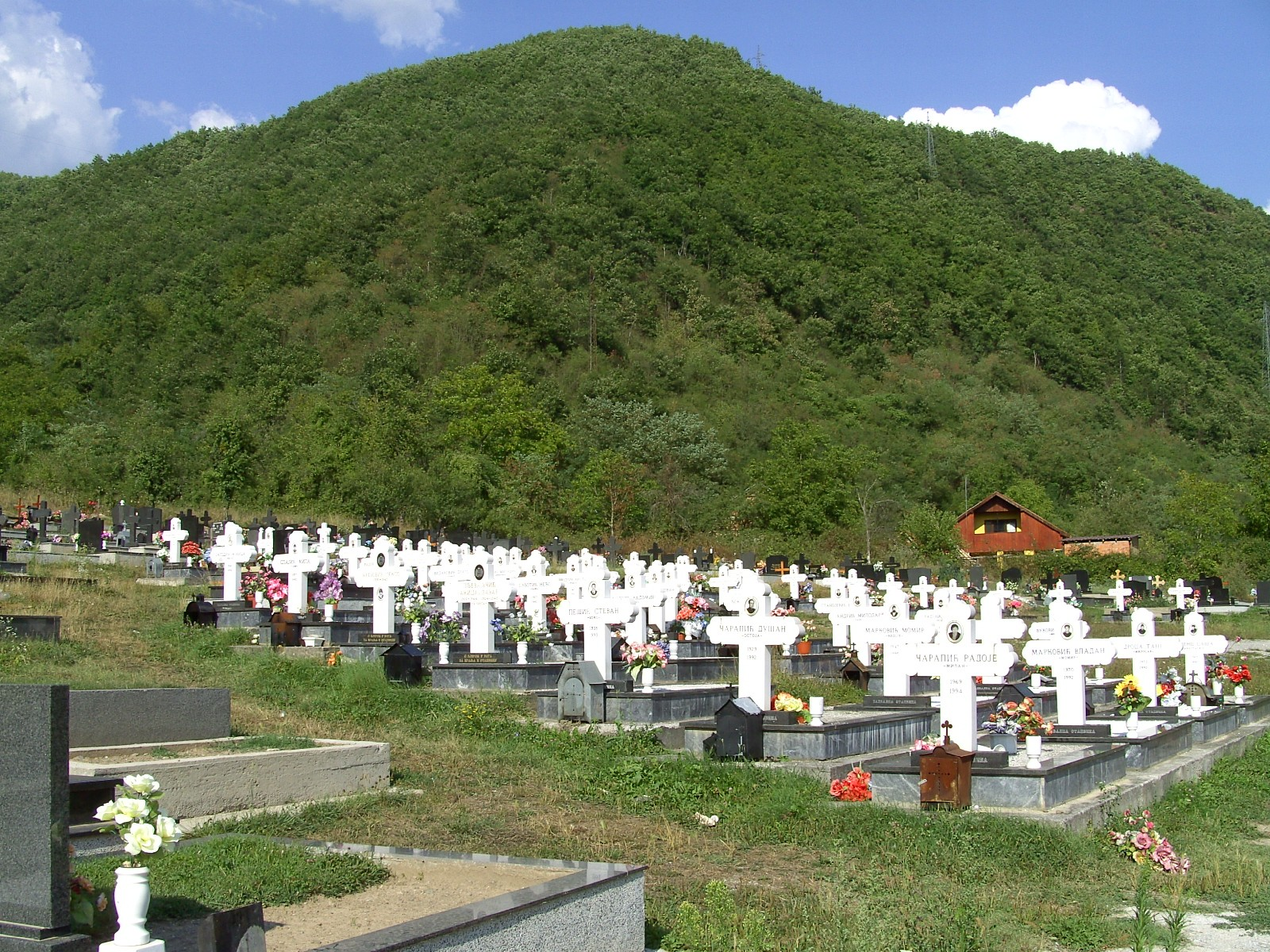
Cemetery in Novo Goražde

=== Population by settlement ===
Settlement	Population (2013 census)	Population (1991 census)
Bašabulići	9	70
Blagojevići	0	13
Bogdanići	27	65
Borak Brdo	39	22
Borova	0	31
Bošanje	0	25
Bučje	23	90
Donje Selo	5	18
Dragolji	8	0
Dragovići	12	55
Džuha	1	21
Gojčevići	14	48
Gradac	82	145
Hajradinovići	2	13
Hladila	51	93
Hrid	9	24
Hrušanj	15	0
Hubjeri	80	80
Jabuka	5	20
Kanlići	25	20
Karauzovići	9	32
Karovići	2	114
Kopači	146	230
Kostenik	24	58
Krašići	40	91
Ljeskovik	0	20
Mašići	251	294
Milanovići	0	0
Nevorići	23	107
Novakovići	2	105
Odžak	7	71
Podhomara	0	56
Podkozara Donja	157	256
Podkozara Gornja	92	136
Podmeljine	0	30
Pribjenovići	18	34
Prolaz	2	20
Pršeši	11	26
Radići	0	0
Radijevići	2	41
Radmilovići	0	42
Rusanj	19	36
Seoca	7	28
Slatina	357	390
Sopotnica	488	268
Surovi	2	13
Šovšići	0	14
Šućurići	0	0
Trebeševo	0	29
Uhotići	0	5
Ustiprača	278	498
Vlahovići	33	76
Zakalje	33	64
Zapljevac	43	128
Zemegresi	3	41
Zidine	556	276
Zorlaci	15	41
Žigovi	12	29
Žitovo	0	15
Živojevići	11	34
Žuželo	37	114
Total	3,117	4,715

=== Ethnic composition ===
Ethnicity	Population (2013 census)	Population (1991 census)
Total	3,117 (100,0%)	4,715 (100,0%)
Bosniaks	1,459 (46.8%)	3,614 (76.6%)
Croats	2 (0.1%)	4 (0.1%)
Serbs	1,618 (51.9%)	1,020 (21.6%)
Others	38 (1.2%)	77 (1.6%)

== Sources ==
- Official website
