= Kopači =

- Village
- Location within Bosnia and Herzegovina
- Coordinates: 44.0006618°N 18.2034599°E
- Country: Bosnia and Herzegovina
- Entity: Federation of Bosnia and Herzegovina
- Canton: Zenica-Doboj
- Municipality: Visoko

Area
  - Total: 0.31 sq mi (0.79 km^{2})

Population (2013)
  - Total: 23
  - Density: 75/sq mi (29/km^{2})
- Time zone: UTC+1 (CET)
  - Summer (DST): UTC+2 (CEST)

Kopači is a village in the municipality of Visoko, Bosnia and Herzegovina.

== Demographics ==
According to the 2013 census, its population was 23.

Ethnicity in 2013
Ethnicity	Number	Percentage
Bosniaks	21	91.3%
other/undeclared	2	8.7%
Total	23	100%
