= Strane, Busovača =

Strane
- Village
- Location within Bosnia and Herzegovina
- Coordinates: 44°07′54″N 17°53′39″E
- Country: Bosnia and Herzegovina
- Entity: Federation of Bosnia and Herzegovina
- Canton: Central Bosnia
- Municipality: Busovača

Area
  - Total: 0.31 sq mi (0.79 km^{2})

Population (2013)
  - Total: 267
  - Density: 880/sq mi (340/km^{2})
- Time zone: UTC+1 (CET)
  - Summer (DST): UTC+2 (CEST)

Strane is a village in the municipality of Busovača, Bosnia and Herzegovina.

== Demographics ==
According to the 2013 census, its population was 267.

Ethnicity in 2013
Ethnicity	Number	Percentage
Bosniaks	264	98.9%
Croats	2	0.7%
other/undeclared	1	0.4%
Total	267	100%
