= Katići =

Katići Катићи
- Village
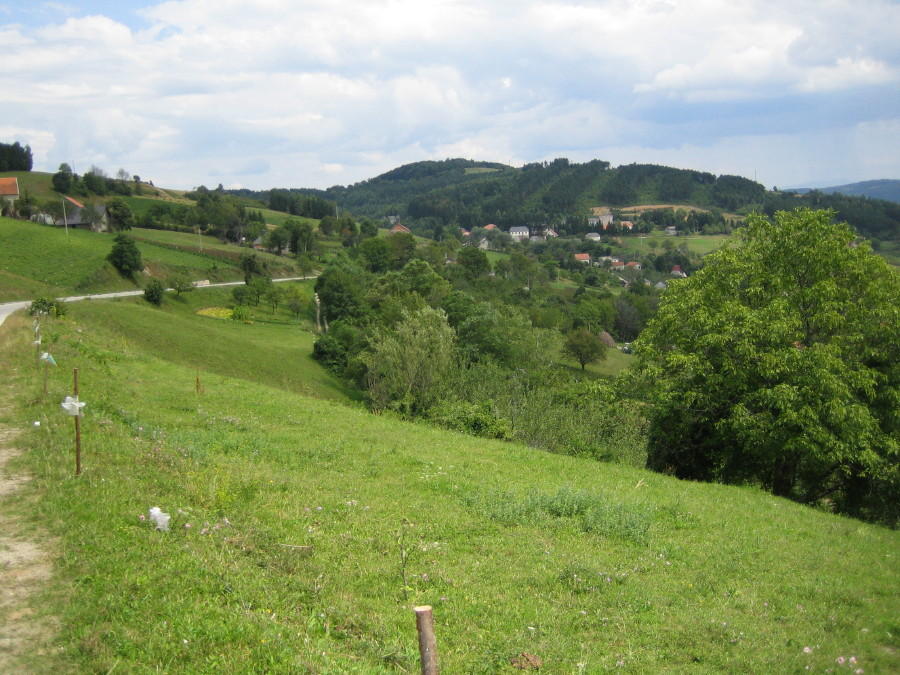

- Location within Serbia
- Coordinates: 43°34′N 20°03′E
- Country: Serbia
- District: Moravica District
- Municipality: Ivanjica

Area
  - Total: 1.78 km^{2} (0.69 sq mi)
- Elevation: 818 m (2,684 ft)

Population (2011)
  - Total: 113
  - Density: 63.5/km^{2} (164/sq mi)
- Time zone: UTC+1 (CET)
  - Summer (DST): UTC+2 (CEST)

Katići (Serbian: Катићи) is a village in the municipality of Ivanjica, Serbia. According to the 2011 census, the village has a population of 113.
