= Nevorići =

Nevorići Неворићи
- Village
- Location within Bosnia and Herzegovina
- Coordinates: 43°36′N 18°57′E
- Country: Bosnia and Herzegovina
- Entity: Republika Srpska
- Municipality: Novo Goražde
- Time zone: UTC+1 (CET)
  - Summer (DST): UTC+2 (CEST)

Nevorići (Cyrillic: Неворићи) is a village in the municipality of Novo Goražde, Republika Srpska, Bosnia and Herzegovina.
