= Zenepići =

- Village
- Location within Bosnia and Herzegovina
- Coordinates: 44.1633491°N 17.6071312°E
- Country: Bosnia and Herzegovina
- Entity: Federation of Bosnia and Herzegovina
- Canton: Central Bosnia
- Municipality: Novi Travnik

Area
  - Total: 1.49 sq mi (3.86 km^{2})

Population (2013)
  - Total: 98
  - Density: 66/sq mi (25/km^{2})
- Time zone: UTC+1 (CET)
  - Summer (DST): UTC+2 (CEST)

Zenepići is a village in the municipality of Novi Travnik, Bosnia and Herzegovina.

== Demographics ==
According to the 2013 census, its population was 98, all Croats.
