= Busovača =

Busovača Бусовача
- Town and municipality
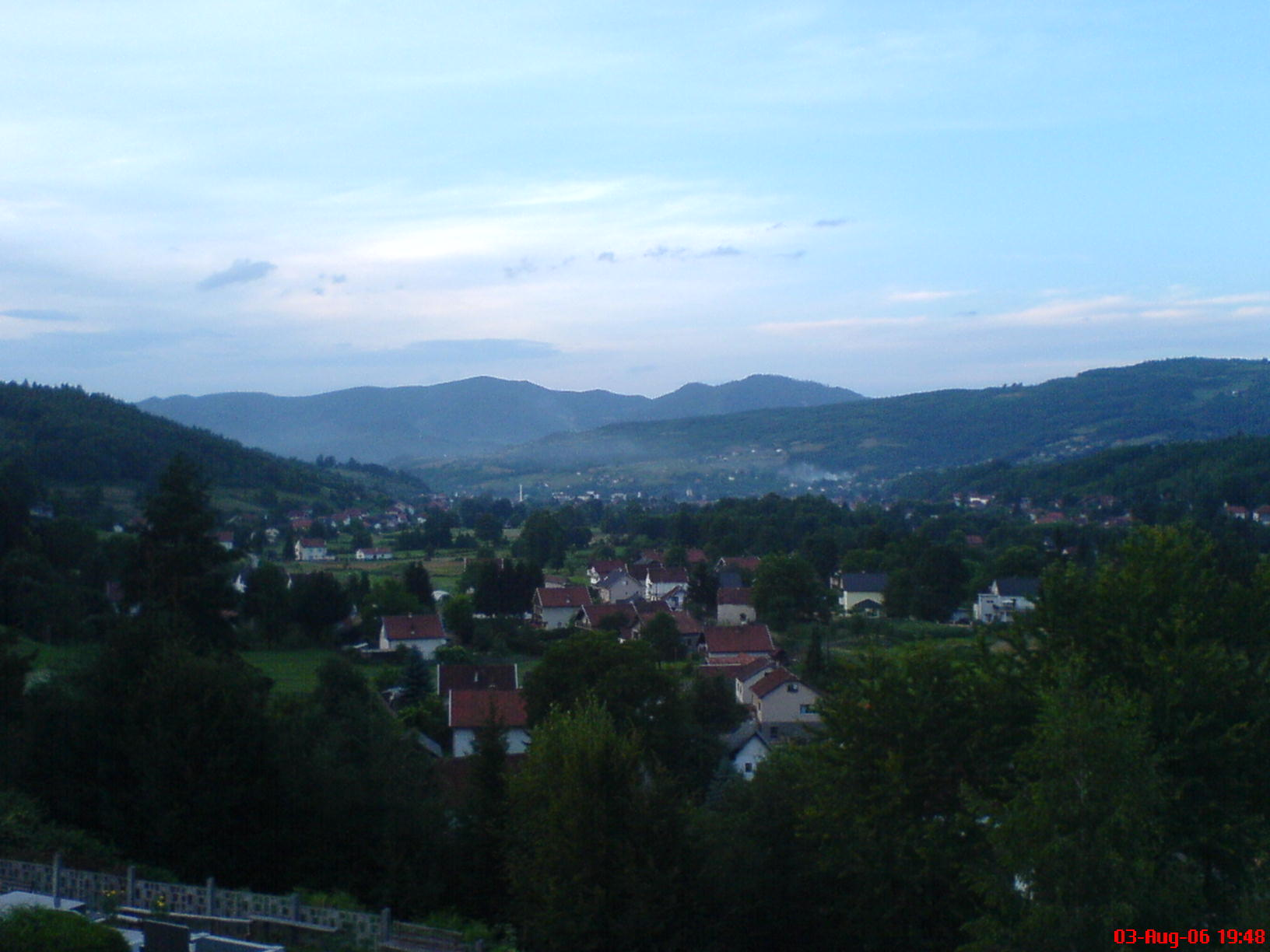

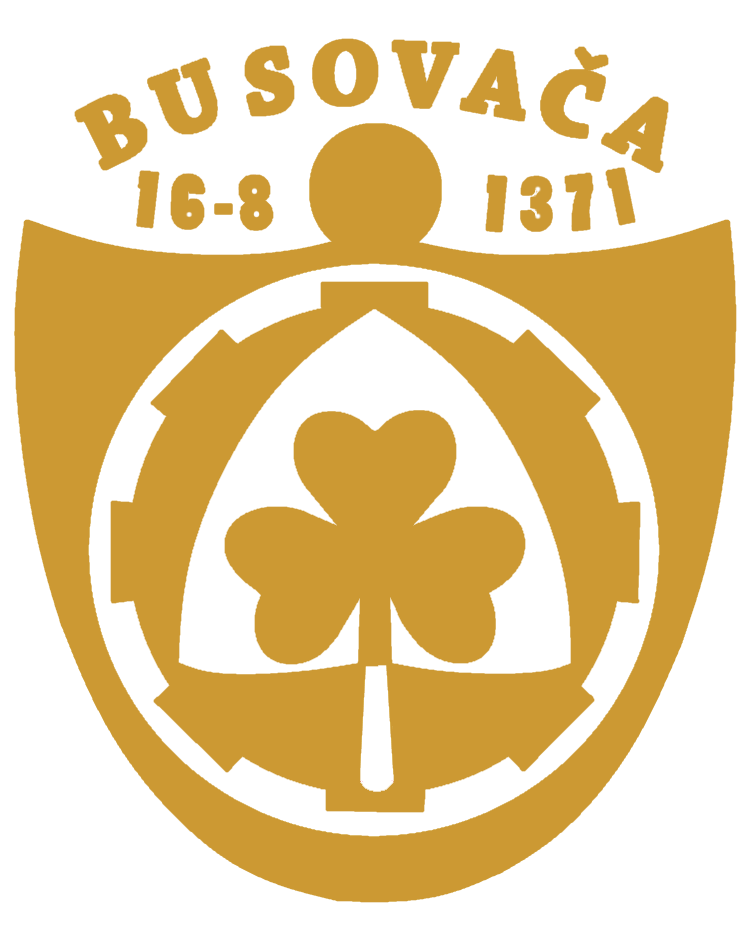
- Coat of arms

- Location of Busovača
- Coordinates: 44°06′N 17°53′E
- Country: Bosnia and Herzegovina
- Entity: Federation of Bosnia and Herzegovina
- Canton: Central Bosnia

Government
  - Municipal mayor: Asim Mekić (SDA)

Population (2013 census)
  - Total: 18,488
  - Density: 119/km^{2} (310/sq mi)
- Time zone: UTC+1 (CET)
  - Summer (DST): UTC+2 (CEST)
- Area code: +387 30
- Website: https://opcina-busovaca.com/

Busovača (Serbian Cyrillic: Бусовача) is a town and municipality located in Central Bosnia Canton of the Federation of Bosnia and Herzegovina, an entity of Bosnia and Herzegovina. It is located 60 km (37 mi) from Sarajevo, 21 km (13 mi) from Zenica, and 30 km (19 mi) from Travnik.

== History ==
During the Croat–Bosniak War, the city saw heavy fighting between the Bosnian Army and the Croatian Defence Council.

== Demographics ==
=== 1971 ===
14.428 total

- Croats - 7,646 (53%)
- Bosniaks - 5,896 (40.9%)
- Serbs - 735 (5.1%)
- Yugoslavs - 60 (0.4%)
- others - 91 (0.65%)

=== 1991 ===
18.879 total

- Croats - 9,093 (48.1%)
- Bosniaks - 8,451 (44.8%)
- Serbs - 623 (3.3%)
- Yugoslavs - 510 (2.7%)
- Others - 202 (1%)

=== 2013 ===
17.910 total

- Croats - 8,873 (49.5%)
- Bosniaks - 8,681 (48.5%)
- Serbs - 205 (1.1%)
- Others - 151 (0.8%)

== Notable people ==
- Rudolf Arapović - Croatian Writer, Dissident
- Senad Brkić - Former Bosnian footballer
- Marinko Čavara - Bosnian politician
- Vedran Vrhovac - Bosnian footballer

== Settlements ==
• Bare • Bukovci • Buselji • Busovača • Carica • Dobraljevo • Dolac • Donja Rovna • Gornja Rovna • Grablje • Granice • Gusti Grab • Hozanovići • Hrasno • Javor • Jazvine • Jelinak • Kaćuni • Kaonik • Katići • Kovačevac • Krčevine • Krvavičići • Kula • Kupres • Lončari • Mehurići • Merdani • Mihaljevići • Milavice • Nezirovići • Očehnići • Oselište • Podbare • Podjele • Podstijena • Polje • Prosje • Putiš • Ravan • Skradno • Solakovići • Strane • Stubica • Šudine • Turići • Zarače
