= Jelići =

Jelići may refer to:

- Jelići (Gornji Vakuf), a village in Bosnia and Herzegovina
- Jelići (Višegrad), a village in Bosnia and Herzegovina
