= Volari =

Volari may refer to:

- Volari, a line of graphics cards produced by XGI Technology
- Volari, Šipovo, a village near Šipovo, Bosnia and Herzegovina
- Volari, a hamlet of Vilić Polje, near Uskoplje, Bosnia and Herzegovina
