= Cvrce =

CVRCE may also refer to:

- C.V.Raman College of Engineering,(CVRCE), Bhubaneshwar, Orissa, India.
- Cvrče
