= Valice, Gornji Vakuf-Uskoplje =

Valice
- Village
- Location within Bosnia and Herzegovina
- Coordinates: 43.8744699°N 17.7083475°E
- Country: Bosnia and Herzegovina
- Entity: Federation of Bosnia and Herzegovina
- Canton: Central Bosnia
- Municipality: Gornji Vakuf-Uskoplje

Area
  - Total: 3.07 sq mi (7.95 km^{2})

Population (2013)
  - Total: 77
  - Density: 25/sq mi (9.7/km^{2})
- Time zone: UTC+1 (CET)
  - Summer (DST): UTC+2 (CEST)

Valice is a village in the municipality of Gornji Vakuf, Bosnia and Herzegovina.

== Demographics ==
According to the 2013 census, its population was 77, all Bosniaks.
