= Battle of Gornji Vakuf =

1993 conflicts in Bosnia and Herzegovina

- Part of the Croat–Bosniak War and Bosnian War
Date	10 January 1993 - Washington Agreement
Location	Gornji Vakuf, Bosnia and Herzegovina
Result	Tactical Bosnian victory: HVO keeps control of small enclaves around the town

Belligerents
Republic of Bosnia and Herzegovina	Croatian Republic of Herzeg-Bosnia; Croatia

Commanders and leaders
Fahrudin Pajo Agić; Vahid Agić	Željko Šiljeg

Units involved
ARBiH; 317th Mountain Brigade; 305th Mountain Brigade; Elements of the 7th Muslim Brigade	HVO; Ante Starčević Brigade; PPN Bruno Bušić

Strength
Unknown	~300 in town ~2,220 in surrounding area

Casualties and losses
Unknown	Unknown

The Battle of Gornji Vakuf was a series of engagements fought between the Army of the Republic of Bosnia and Herzegovina (ARBiH) and the Croatian Defence Council (HVO) in and around the town of Gornji Vakuf (known to Croats as Uskoplje) during 1993, as part of the Croat–Bosniak War.

== Background ==
Gornji Vakuf was of vital strategic importance due to its position at the southern terminus of the Novi Travnik–Gornji Vakuf supply route, which linked Croat-held enclaves in central Bosnia with Herzegovina. Prior to the outbreak of hostilities between Bosniaks and Croats, the town had a mixed population of approximately 14,000 Muslims and 10,000 Croats, with surrounding villages often having Croat majorities.

On 20 June 1992, in the afternoon, between 14:40 and 15:00, the HVO from the lower part of the town opened fire on the part of the town inhabited by majority Muslim population. In the meantime, the unit Garavi in location Karamustafic set up a check-point and started arresting and taking people to a meadow that had a wire fence around it, and that is where people were stopped, searched, identified, and held. Croatian Army was also involved in the battle. The HVO had formed local units following the outbreak of the war in Croatia, while in August 1992 the Muslim Green Berets paramilitary group established a headquarters in the town. Despite rising tensions, serious violence did not occur until January 1993. On 12 January HVO descended from the surrounding hills and on 13 January 1993, HVO Colonel Željko Šiljeg issued an ultimatum to the Army of the Republic of Bosnia and Herzegovina in Gornji Vakuf, demanding that it disarm and place itself under HVO control, citing the ‘HVO Decision on the Organization of Provinces.’ The ARBiH did not accept the ultimatum.”

== January 1993 fighting ==
Between 8 and 10 January 1993, approximately one hundred Croats were expelled from Muslim-controlled areas of the town. On 10 January, Muslim forces blocked the main road and prevented HVO units from transiting toward the Serb front. On 13 January 1993, units of the ARBiH III Corps primarily the 305th and 317th Mountain Brigades under the command of Vahid Agić attacked HVO positions in Gornji Vakuf. The town was defended by elements of the Ante Starčević Brigade, subordinate to Brigadier Željko Šiljeg’s Operative Zone Northwest Herzegovina.

A front line was established through the center of town, with ARBiH forces gaining control of areas south of the HVO military police headquarters. Following the initial clashes, ARBiH units occupied surrounding high ground, while the HVO, lacking manpower for a continuous defensive line, relied on strongpoints along key terrain. Mehmed Behlo, Commander of the 2nd Battalion of the 317th Brigade, testified that the HVO forces, which were mainly concentrated in Prozor, used the Makljen road leading to Gornji Vakuf to get reinforcements and to deploy their forces in the village of Pidris and in Makljen. From these positions, the HVO artillery shelled Gornji Vakuf. On 19 January 1993, it was agreed that a joint order should be sent by the ARBiH and HVO high commands to the local commanders in Gornji Vakuf to ease the tension. On 20 January, the HVO and ARBiH agreed on a ceasefire in Gornji Vakuf to fight together against the Bosnian Serbs.

== August–November 1993 offensive ==
Following its successful offensive in Bugojno, the ARBiH prepared an assault on Gornji Vakuf as the next phase of its campaign. Forces were concentrated in late July, and on 1 August 1993 the ARBiH launched a coordinated attack. The offensive was led by the local 317th Gornji Vakuf Mountain Brigade, commanded by Fahrudin Pajo Agić, and was likely reinforced by a battalion from the elite 7th Muslim Brigade. Attacks were launched from the northwest, north, and east against HVO defenders of the Ante Starčević Brigade.

After intense fighting throughout the night, ARBiH forces secured control over most of the town by the following day. UN peacekeepers and Western journalists confirmed that approximately 95 percent of Gornji Vakuf was under Bosnian government control, with HVO forces retaining only a small enclave in the Croat-majority southwestern neighborhood, which Croat authorities renamed Uskoplje.

== Stalemate and counterattacks ==
Despite its gains, the ARBiH failed to eliminate remaining HVO pockets. The HVO retained key positions, including the Podovi Ridge southwest of the town, allowing them to direct artillery and machine-gun fire into the town center. A smaller Croat enclave also remained in the Trnovača area to the north.

On 5 August 1993, HVO forces attempted a counterattack using mortars and small arms but failed to regain lost ground. Further attacks supported by tanks and heavy artillery on 15–16 September were likewise unsuccessful. The town was subjected to intermittent heavy shelling, notably on 21 October and 15 November, causing extensive destruction but no territorial changes. By late 1993, a stalemate had emerged, with the confrontation line running through the town itself.
