= Wayne Edwards =

Wayne Edwards may refer to:

- Wayne Edwards (baseball) (born 1964), American former MLB pitcher
- Wayne Edwards (music executive), American music label executive
- Wayne Edwards (racing driver) (born 1967), American professional stock car racing driver
- Wayne Edwards (soldier) (1966–1993), British soldier
- Edward Edwards (serial killer) (1933–2011), American serial killer and former fugitive; middle name Wayne
