= Pridvorci =

Pridvorci may refer to the following places:

- Pridvorci, Gornji Vakuf-Uskoplje
- Presjeka, Nevesinje
- Pridvorci, Trebinje
