= Hrasnica =

Hrasnica may refer to:

- Hrasnica, Ilidža, a neighborhood in Bosnia and Herzegovina
- Hrasnica, Gornji Vakuf-Uskoplje, a village in Bosnia and Herzegovina
- FK Famos Hrasnica, a football club in Hrasnica, Ilidža
