= Operation Grapple (Yugoslavia) =

1992–95 British operations in the former Yugoslavia

Coordinates: 44°09′30″N 17°47′18″E

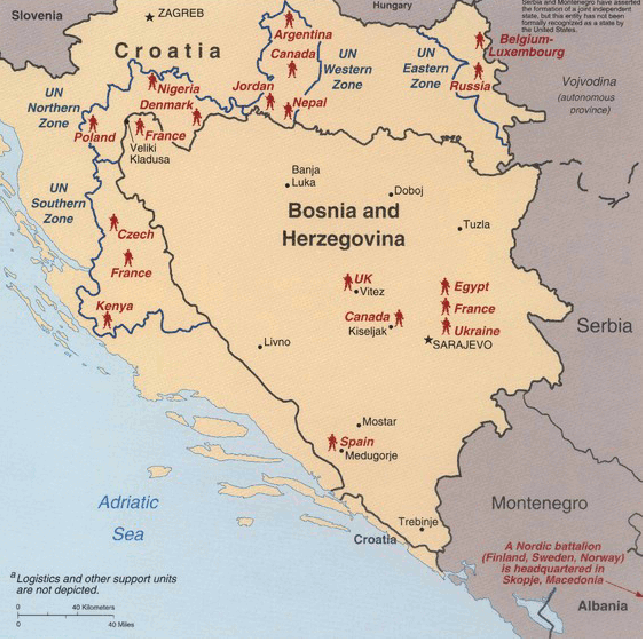
UNPROFOR deployments in early 1993.

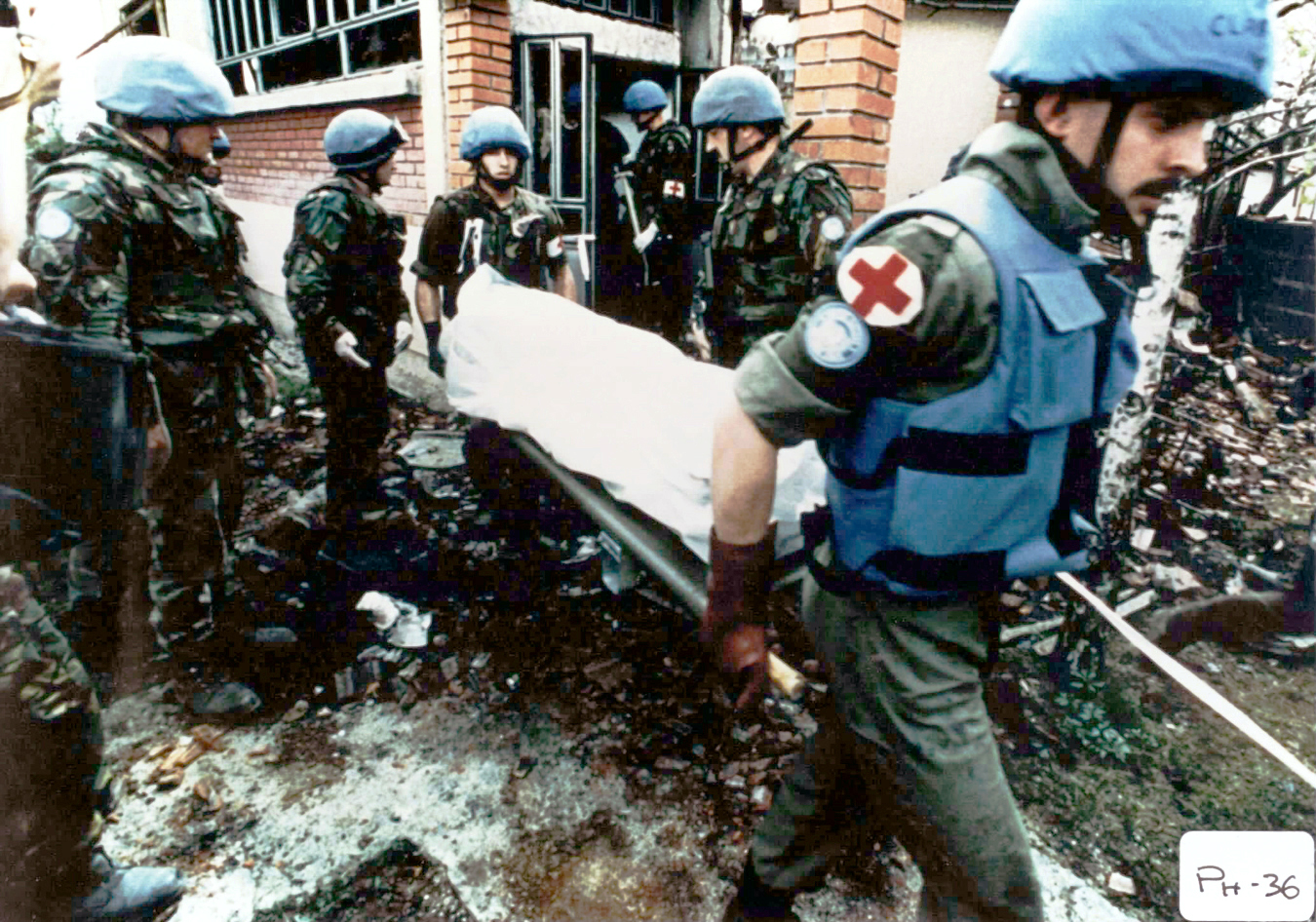
Soldiers of the Cheshire Regiment removing bodies from a building in the village Ahmići in April 1993.

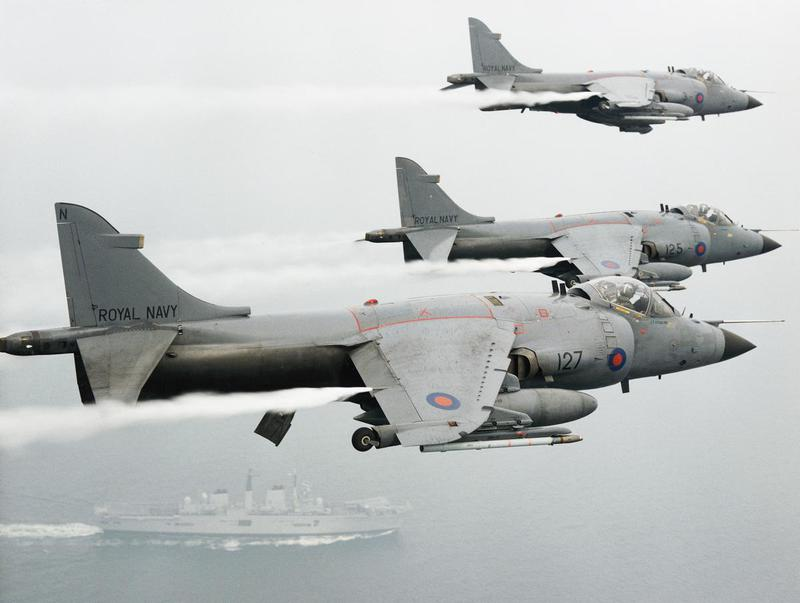
Sea Harriers from HMS Invincible based in the Adriatic Sea during Operation Grapple, supporting UNPROFOR in Bosnia. On 20 September 1993 HMS Invincible hosted unsuccessful Warring Parties Peace Talks, hosted by Lord Owen and Mr Stoltenborg. In April 1994 a Sea Harrier was shot down on a mission near Gorazde; the pilot ejected safely and was recovered

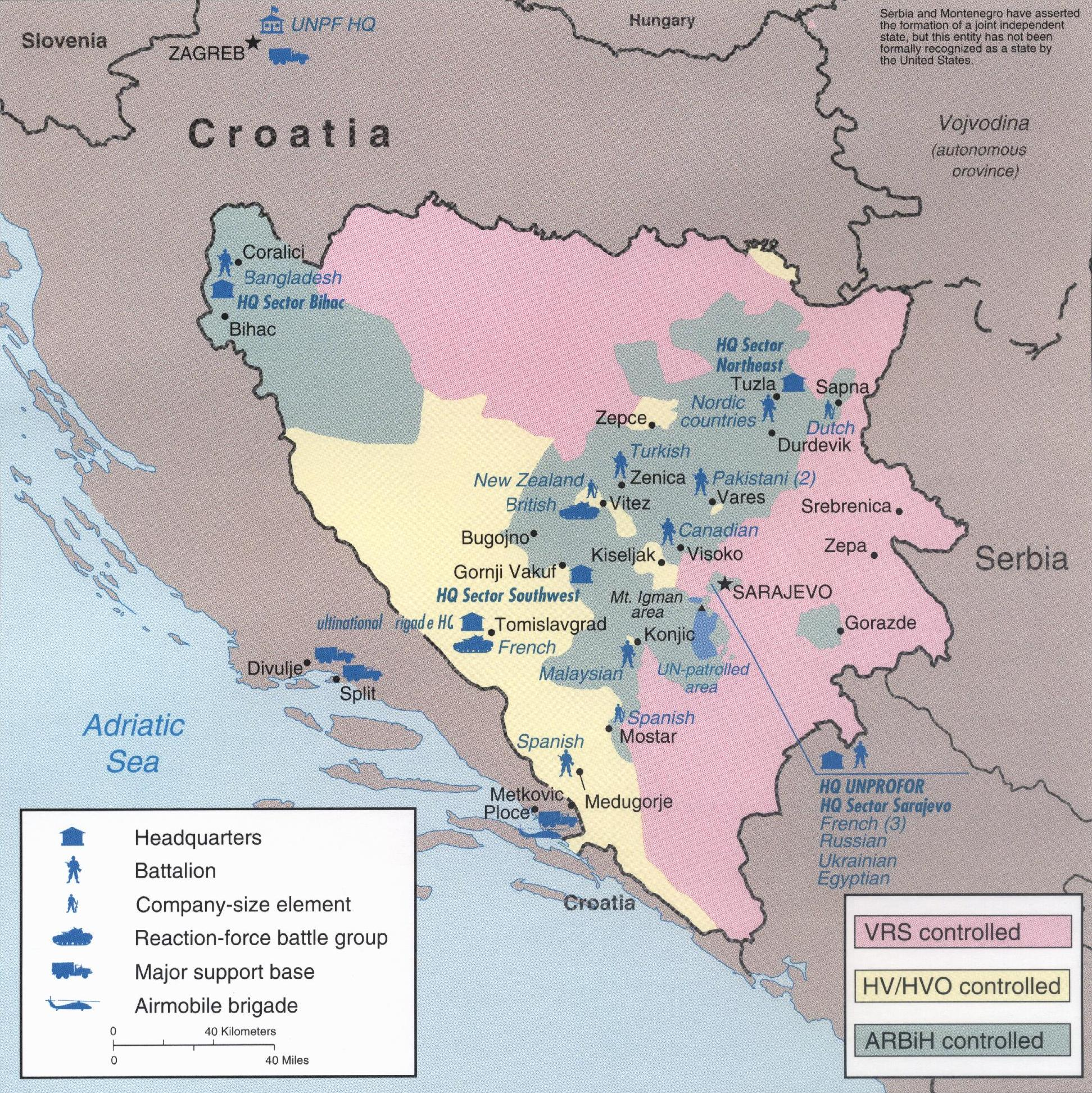
UNPROFOR deployments in October 1995.

Operation Grapple was the codeword used to cover UK defence operations in support of the UN peacekeeping missions in the former Yugoslavia (authorised by UNSCR 776 of September 1992); including the deployment of British forces in Bosnia and Croatia from October 1992 until December 1995 as part of the United Nations Protection Force (UNPROFOR). UNPROFOR would eventually hand over the peacekeeping mission in Bosnia to NATO's Implementation Force (IFOR) in winter 1995. The British participation in the IFOR was called Operation Resolute; the whole NATO mission was called Operation Joint Endeavour. The IFOR mission would last approximately a year, before it transitioned to the follow-on Stabilisation Force in Bosnia and Herzegovina (SFOR).

The United Kingdom originally deployed a compact army headquarters staff (commanded by a brigadier) - based in a former Yugoslav People's Army (JNA) barracks at Divulje near Split. The force was supervised by the Army's Land Command at Wilton in Wiltshire. The main manoeuvre forces were an infantry battle group (based in Bosnia); supported by an armoured reconnaissance squadron, a combat engineer squadron and a logistics support unit. A detachment of Fleet Air Arm Sea King troop carrying helicopters from 845 Naval Air Squadron was also based in Divulje barracks. Some of the British unit locations were very isolated with only small amounts of security such as the Royal Engineers base at Camp Redoubt on a particularly hilly part of the main supply route to Vitez and 7 Armoured Workshop Company Royal Electrical and Mechanical Engineers in Gornji Vakuf-Uskoplje providing Second Line Equipment Support (ES), the British contribution to UNPROFOR also included the deployment of Royal Navy ships sailing in the Adriatic Sea and RAF aircraft supporting troop movements in Croatia. Two Royal Fleet Auxiliary ships were also berthed in Split's north port to provide accommodation and logistics support. This force would be increased in size over the course of the UN peacekeeping mandate in the Former Yugoslavia up until August 1995 when the British force was steadily drawn down.

The UK agreed to join the UN force to protect humanitarian convoys in Bosnia, as part of UNPROFOR 2. In early October 1992, 7 Armoured Workshop Company Royal Electrical and Mechanical Engineers arrived to set up the in-theatre Second Line Equipment Support (ES) and to provide the Recovery and Repair along the L of C. The (BRITBAT) the Cheshire Regiment which deployed with its Warrior tracked armoured vehicle in late October 1992 through the Croatian port of Split, eventually headquartering itself in a school on the outskirts of the town of Vitez in the Lašva Valley. The battalion would have operating bases in Gornji Vakuf and Tuzla; and there was also a British logistics base at Tomislavgrad. The British contingent was expanded with the addition of another battalion group in March 1994.

The first BRITBAT's time in Bosnia was not without controversy and its commanding officer Lieutenant Colonel Bob Stewart very publicly lost his composure and impartiality after his unit discovered the remains of Muslim civilians who had been massacred by Croats in the village of Ahmići in April 1993.

British units took casualties from the outset and Lance Corporal Wayne Edwards, a Warrior tracked armoured vehicle driver, was shot and killed by a sniper, whilst driving his vehicle in Gornji Vakuf on 13 January 1993. Others would also sadly lose their lives; such as Private Shaun Taylor mortally wounded on 26 June 1994 near Goražde. British armed forces would serve nearly 15 years in Bosnia and would see more than 50 comrades killed and many more wounded. Many of the casualties were as a result of Bosnia and Croatia's appalling road and weather conditions.

BRITBAT and its supporting sub-units would win praise by becoming the guardians of the only functioning main supply route into the core of Bosnia and ultimately Sarajevo and Tuzla, the maintenance of Routes Triangle and Diamond would remain a critical combat engineering task.

== Key British officers involved in Operation Grapple ==
The following officers filled key roles in the UK's UNPROFOR mission:

- Lieutenant General Sir Michael Rose Commander UN Forces in Bosnia Herzegovina
- Major General David Pennefather Commander UN Rapid Reaction Force
- Brigadier Andrew Cumming - COMBRITFOR Grapple 1
- Brigadier Robin Searby - COMBRITFOR Grapple 2
- Brigadier John Reith - COMBRITFOR Grapple 3
- Brigadier Andrew Pringle - COMBRITFOR Grapple 6
- Lieutenant Colonel Bob Stewart - CO of the Cheshire Regiment
- Lieutenant Colonel Alastair Duncan - CO of the Prince of Wales's Own Regiment of Yorkshire
- Lieutenant Colonel Peter Williams - CO of the Coldstream Guards
- Lieutenant Colonel David Santa-Olalla - CO of the Duke of Wellington's Regiment
- Lieutenant Colonel Jeff Cook - CO of the Devonshire and Dorset Regiment
- Lieutenant Colonel Jonathon Riley - CO of the Royal Welch Fusiliers.
- Lieutenant Colonel Dick Applegate - CO BRITARTYBAT 19th Regiment Royal Artillery and 1 NL Battery RNLMC

== See also ==
- Yugoslav Wars
- Battle of the Barracks
- Bosnian War
- Lašva Valley ethnic cleansing
- Foreign fighters in the Bosnian War
- List of massacres in Bosnia and Herzegovina
