= Nihad Alibegović =

Bosnian singer (born 1962)

- Born: 1 January 1962 (age 64); Gornji Vakuf, SR Bosnia and Herzegovina, SFR Yugoslavia
- Occupations: singer-songwriter; producer
- Years active: 1983–present
- Musical career
- Genres: Folk; Pop-folk
- Instrument: Vocals
- Labels: Jugodisk; Sarajevo Disk; Gold Music; BN Music; Grand Production

Nihad Alibegović; born 1 January 1962) is a Bosnian singer with a career spanning over 30 years.

== Early life ==
Alibegović was born in Gornji Vakuf, Bosnia and Herzegovina on 1 January 1962. His family hails from the village Voljice near Gornji Vakuf. Alibegović relocated to Sarajevo as a teenager, where his interest in music began.

== Career ==
Alibegović released his tenth studio album Zelena in May 2008. His eleventh studio album Blago meni (2010) was released under the record label BN Music.

Originally Alibegović was intended to record the 2011 pop rock duet "Dva jarana" with Enes Begović, but the song ended up featuring Mladen Vojičić Tifa. The song was written by Bosnian-German songwriter Amir Jesenković.

He is currently signed to Grand Production.

== Discography ==
- Galebe moj (1984)
- Plači sa mnom violino (1985)
- Tebe nema (1992)
- Ljubi, ljubi mene ti (1993)
- Zakletva (1994)
- Zvijezda sreće (1999)
- Nemoj, pa se ne boj (2002)
- Noćas s′ tobom ostajem (2004)
- Produži moj život (2006)
- Zelena (2008)
- Blago meni (2010)
- Samo za nju (2012)
