= Batuša =

Batuša Батуша
- Village
- Location within Bosnia and Herzegovina
- Coordinates: 43°56′40″N 17°34′36″E
- Country: Bosnia and Herzegovina
- Entity: Federation of Bosnia and Herzegovina
- Canton: Central Bosnia
- Municipality: Gornji Vakuf-Uskoplje

Area
  - Total: 0.20 sq mi (0.53 km^{2})

Population (2013)
  - Total: 1,111
  - Density: 5,400/sq mi (2,100/km^{2})
- Time zone: UTC+1 (CET)
  - Summer (DST): UTC+2 (CEST)

Batuša (Cyrillic: Батуша) is a village in the municipality of Gornji Vakuf, Bosnia and Herzegovina.

== Demographics ==
According to the 2013 census, its population was 1,111.

Ethnicity in 2013
| Ethnicity | Number | Percentage |
|---|---|---|
| Bosniaks | 974 | 87.7% |
| Croats | 124 | 11.2% |
| Serbs | 0 | 0.0% |
| other/undeclared | 13 | 1.2% |
| Total | 1,111 | 100% |
