= Mračaj (Gornji Vakuf) =

- Village
- Location within Bosnia and Herzegovina
- Coordinates: 43°53′40″N 17°38′15″E
- Country: Bosnia and Herzegovina
- Entity: Federation of Bosnia and Herzegovina
- Canton: Central Bosnia
- Municipality: Gornji Vakuf-Uskoplje

Area
  - Total: 3.08 sq mi (7.97 km^{2})

Population (2013)
  - Total: 242
  - Density: 78.6/sq mi (30.4/km^{2})
- Time zone: UTC+1 (CET)
  - Summer (DST): UTC+2 (CEST)

Mračaj is a village in the municipality of Gornji Vakuf, Bosnia and Herzegovina.

== Demographics ==
According to the 2013 census, its population was 242.

Ethnicity in 2013
Ethnicity	Number	Percentage
Croats	239	98.8%
Serbs	2	0.8%
other/undeclared	1	0.4%
Total	242	100%
