= Kute (Gornji Vakuf) =

- Village
- Location within Bosnia and Herzegovina
- Country: Bosnia and Herzegovina
- Entity: Federation of Bosnia and Herzegovina
- Canton: Central Bosnia
- Municipality: Gornji Vakuf-Uskoplje

Area
  - Total: 1.27 sq mi (3.30 km^{2})

Population (2013)
  - Total: 167
  - Density: 131/sq mi (50.6/km^{2})
- Time zone: UTC+1 (CET)
  - Summer (DST): UTC+2 (CEST)

Kute is a village in the municipality of Gornji Vakuf, Bosnia and Herzegovina.

== Demographics ==
According to the 2013 census, its population was 167.

Ethnicity in 2013
Ethnicity	Number	Percentage
Croats	97	58.1%
Bosniaks	69	41.3%
other/undeclared	1	0.6%
Total	167	100%
