= Ploča (Gornji Vakuf) =

- Village
- Location within Bosnia and Herzegovina
- Coordinates: 43°57′15″N 17°32′24″E
- Country: Bosnia and Herzegovina
- Entity: Federation of Bosnia and Herzegovina
- Canton: Central Bosnia
- Municipality: Gornji Vakuf-Uskoplje

Area
  - Total: 1.59 sq mi (4.11 km^{2})

Population (2013)
  - Total: 193
  - Density: 122/sq mi (47.0/km^{2})
- Time zone: UTC+1 (CET)
  - Summer (DST): UTC+2 (CEST)

Ploča is a village in the municipality of Gornji Vakuf, Bosnia and Herzegovina.

== Demographics ==
According to the 2013 census, its population was 193.

Ethnicity in 2013
Ethnicity	Number	Percentage
Croats	188	97.4%
Bosniaks	5	2.6%
Total	193	100%
