= Paloč =

- Village
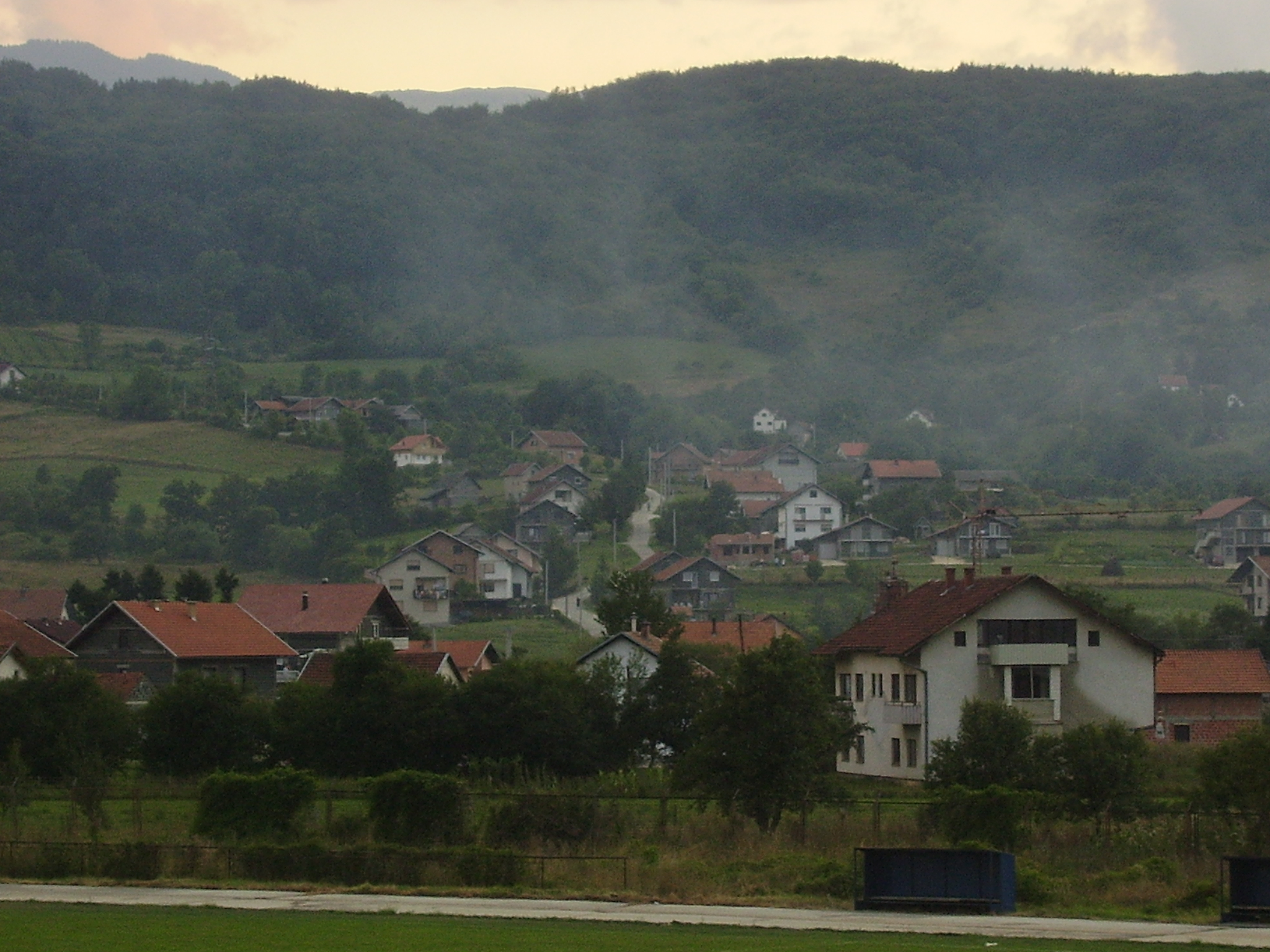
- View of the village of Paloč from Uskoplje

- Location within Bosnia and Herzegovina
- Country: Bosnia and Herzegovina
- Entity: Federation of Bosnia and Herzegovina
- Canton: Central Bosnia
- Municipality: Gornji Vakuf-Uskoplje

Area
  - Total: 1.26 sq mi (3.26 km^{2})

Population (2013)
  - Total: 351
  - Density: 279/sq mi (108/km^{2})
- Time zone: UTC+1 (CET)
  - Summer (DST): UTC+2 (CEST)

Paloč is a village in the municipality of Gornji Vakuf, Bosnia and Herzegovina.

== Demographics ==
According to the 2013 census, its population was 351.

Ethnicity in 2013
Ethnicity	Number	Percentage
Croats	323	92.0%
Bosniaks	27	7.7%
other/undeclared	1	0.3%
Total	351	100%

== See also ==
- Duša killings
