= Humac, Gornji Vakuf-Uskoplje =

Humac
- Village
- Location within Bosnia and Herzegovina
- Coordinates: 43°59′31″N 17°30′33″E
- Country: Bosnia and Herzegovina
- Entity: Federation of Bosnia and Herzegovina
- Canton: Central Bosnia
- Municipality: Gornji Vakuf-Uskoplje

Area
  - Total: 0.43 sq mi (1.11 km^{2})

Population (2013)
  - Total: 171
  - Density: 399/sq mi (154/km^{2})
- Time zone: UTC+1 (CET)
  - Summer (DST): UTC+2 (CEST)

Humac is a village in the municipality of Gornji Vakuf, Bosnia and Herzegovina.

== Demographics ==
According to the 2013 census, its population was 171.

Ethnicity in 2013
Ethnicity	Number	Percentage
Croats	165	96.5%
Bosniaks	4	2.3%
Serbs	1	0.6%
other/undeclared	1	0.6%
Total	171	100%
