= Crkvice, Gornji Vakuf-Uskoplje =

Crkvice
- Village
- Location within Bosnia and Herzegovina
- Coordinates: 43.8934°N 17.7048°E
- Country: Bosnia and Herzegovina
- Entity: Federation of Bosnia and Herzegovina
- Canton: Central Bosnia
- Municipality: Gornji Vakuf-Uskoplje

Area
  - Total: 7.14 sq mi (18.50 km^{2})

Population (2013)
  - Total: 175
  - Density: 24.5/sq mi (9.46/km^{2})
- Time zone: UTC+1 (CET)
  - Summer (DST): UTC+2 (CEST)

Crkvice is a village in the municipality of Gornji Vakuf, Bosnia and Herzegovina.

== Demographics ==
According to the 2013 census, its population was 175, all Bosniaks.
