= Bistrica (Gornji Vakuf) =

- Village
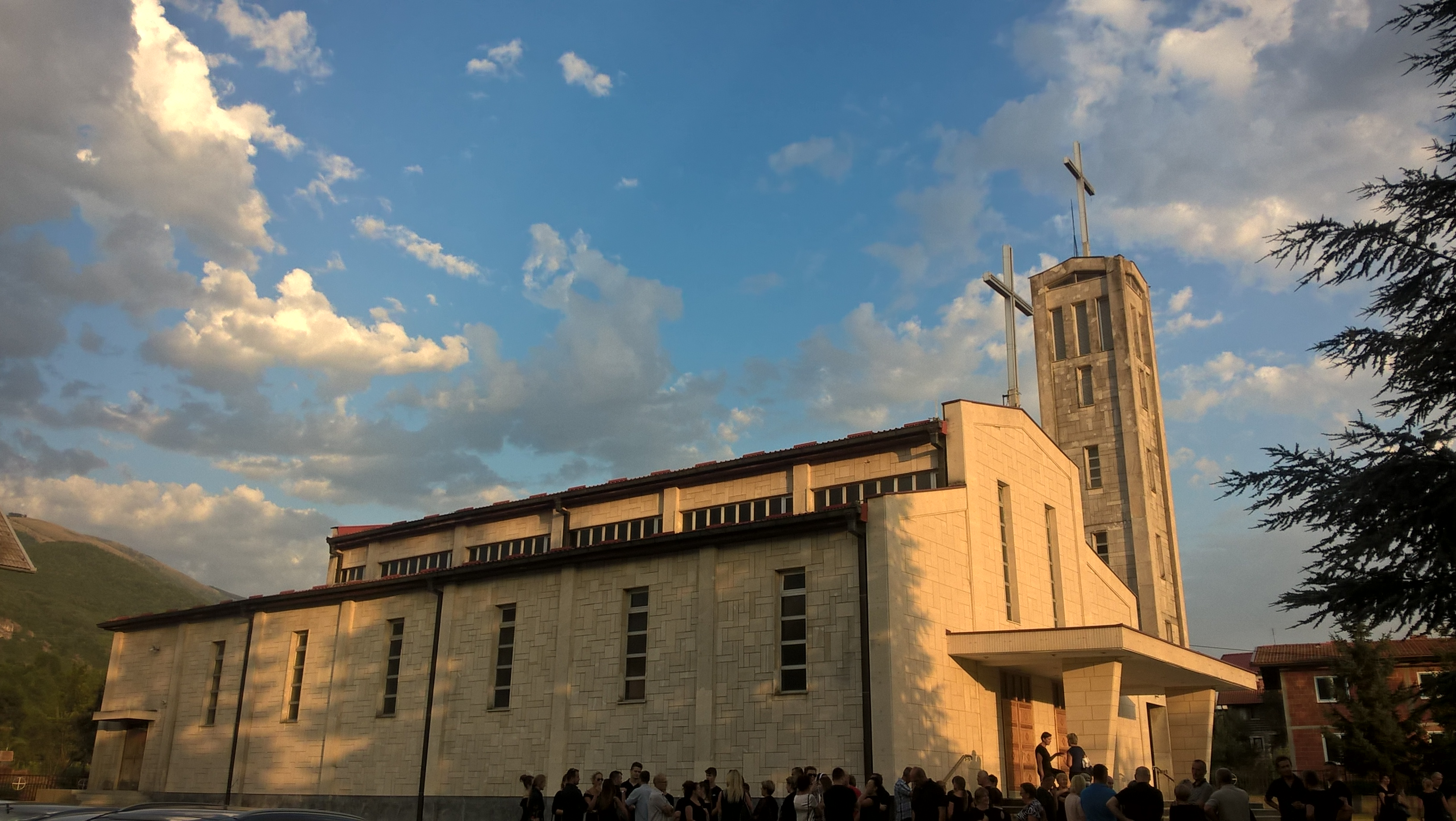

- Location within Bosnia and Herzegovina
- Coordinates: 43°56′14.97″N 17°35′18.46″E
- Country: Bosnia and Herzegovina
- Entity: Federation of Bosnia and Herzegovina
- Canton: Central Bosnia
- Municipality: Gornji Vakuf-Uskoplje

Area
  - Total: 22.00 sq mi (56.99 km^{2})

Population (2013)
  - Total: 1,378
  - Density: 62.63/sq mi (24.18/km^{2})
- Time zone: UTC+1 (CET)
  - Summer (DST): UTC+2 (CEST)

Bistrica is a village in the municipality of Gornji Vakuf, Bosnia and Herzegovina.

It was the place of a massacre in the Croat–Bosniak War in August 1993

== Demographics ==
According to the 2013 census, its population was 1,378.

Ethnicity in 2013
Ethnicity	Number	Percentage
Bosniaks	686	49.8%
Croats	683	49.6%
Serbs	1	0.1%
other/undeclared	8	0.6%
Total	1,378	100%
