= Bojska =

- Village
- Location within Bosnia and Herzegovina
- Country: Bosnia and Herzegovina
- Entity: Federation of Bosnia and Herzegovina
- Canton: Central Bosnia
- Municipality: Gornji Vakuf-Uskoplje

Area
  - Total: 10.10 sq mi (26.16 km^{2})

Population (2013)
  - Total: 522
  - Density: 51.7/sq mi (20.0/km^{2})
- Time zone: UTC+1 (CET)
  - Summer (DST): UTC+2 (CEST)

Bojska is a village in the municipality of Gornji Vakuf, Bosnia and Herzegovina.

== Demographics ==
According to the 2013 census, its population was 522.

Ethnicity in 2013
Ethnicity	Number	Percentage
Bosniaks	521	99.8%
other/undeclared	1	0.2%
Total	522	100%
