= Ždrimci =

- Village
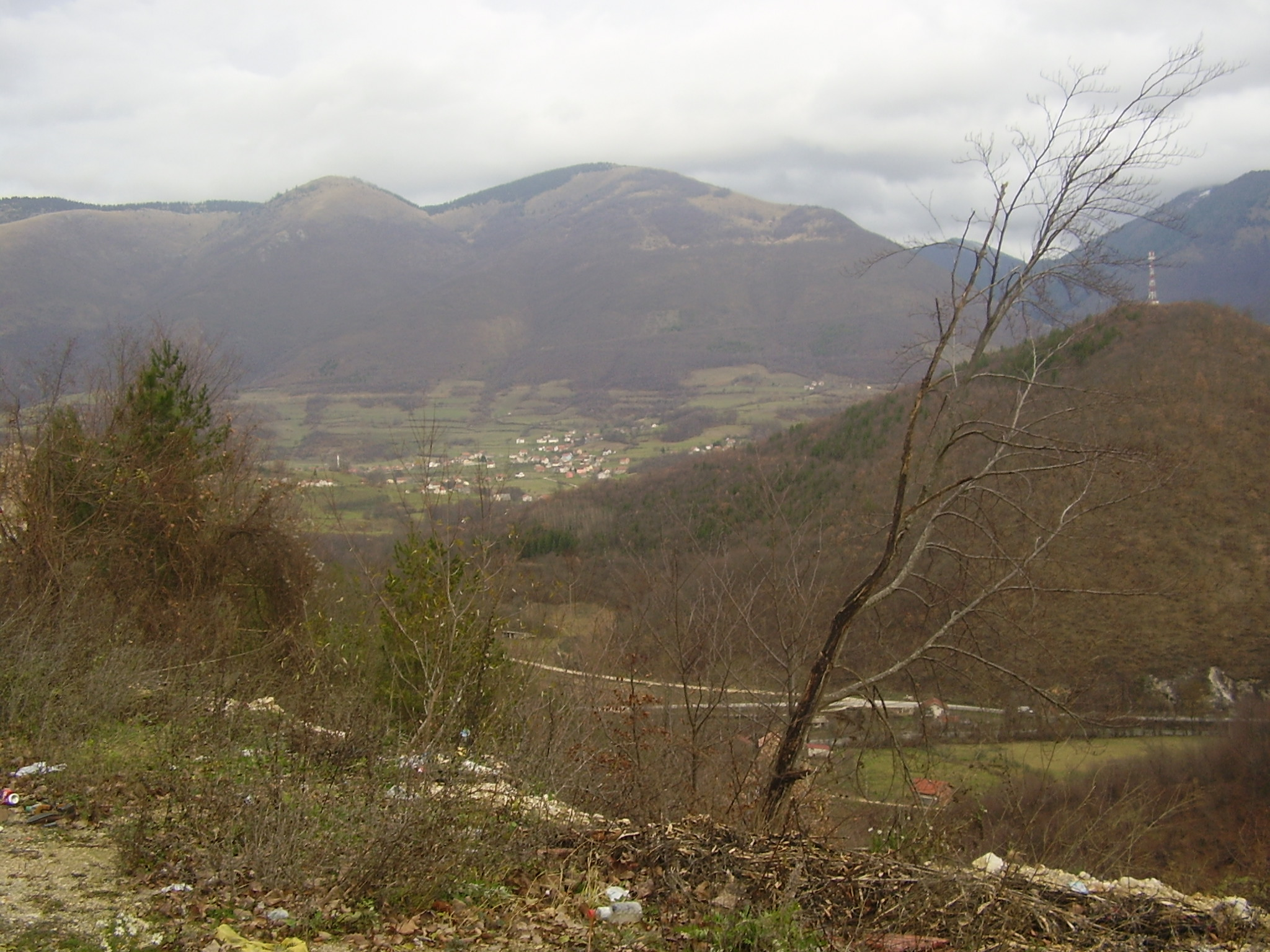

- Location within Bosnia and Herzegovina
- Coordinates: 43°55′N 17°38′E
- Country: Bosnia and Herzegovina
- Entity: Federation of Bosnia and Herzegovina
- Canton: Central Bosnia
- Municipality: Gornji Vakuf-Uskoplje

Area
  - Total: 7.84 sq mi (20.31 km^{2})

Population (2013)
  - Total: 677
  - Density: 86.3/sq mi (33.3/km^{2})
- Time zone: UTC+1 (CET)
  - Summer (DST): UTC+2 (CEST)

Ždrimci (Cyrillic: Ждримци) is a village in the municipality of Gornji Vakuf-Uskoplje, Bosnia and Herzegovina.

== Demographics ==
According to the 2013 census, its population was 677.

Ethnicity in 2013
Ethnicity	Number	Percentage
Croats	532	77.3%
Bosniaks	145	21.4%
Serbs	1	0.1%
other/undeclared	8	1.2%
Total	677	100%
