= Uzričje =

- Village
- Location within Bosnia and Herzegovina
- Coordinates: 43°55′N 17°35′E
- Country: Bosnia and Herzegovina
- Entity: Federation of Bosnia and Herzegovina
- Canton: Central Bosnia
- Municipality: Gornji Vakuf-Uskoplje

Area
  - Total: 0.48 sq mi (1.24 km^{2})

Population (2013)
  - Total: 106
  - Density: 221/sq mi (85.5/km^{2})
- Time zone: UTC+1 (CET)
  - Summer (DST): UTC+2 (CEST)

Uzričje is a village in the municipality of Gornji Vakuf, Bosnia and Herzegovina.

== Demographics ==
According to the 2013 census, its population was 106.

Ethnicity in 2013
Ethnicity	Number	Percentage
Bosniaks	60	56.6%
Croats	38	35.8%
other/undeclared	8	7.5%
Total	106	100%
