= Podgrađe (Gornji Vakuf) =

- Village
- Location within Bosnia and Herzegovina
- Country: Bosnia and Herzegovina
- Entity: Federation of Bosnia and Herzegovina
- Canton: Central Bosnia
- Municipality: Gornji Vakuf-Uskoplje

Area
  - Total: 0.73 sq mi (1.88 km^{2})

Population (2013)
  - Total: 467
  - Density: 643/sq mi (248/km^{2})
- Time zone: UTC+1 (CET)
  - Summer (DST): UTC+2 (CEST)

Podgrađe is a village in the municipality of Gornji Vakuf, Bosnia and Herzegovina. Village has population of 467 people according census 2013

== Demographics ==
According to the 2013 census, its population was 467.

Ethnicity in 2013
Ethnicity	Number	Percentage
Croats	463	99.1%
Serbs	2	0.4%
Bosniaks	1	0.2%
other/undeclared	1	0.2%
Total	467	100%
