= Kozice (Gornji Vakuf) =

- Village
- Location within Bosnia and Herzegovina
- Coordinates: 43°54′34″N 17°44′56″E
- Country: Bosnia and Herzegovina
- Entity: Federation of Bosnia and Herzegovina
- Canton: Central Bosnia
- Municipality: Gornji Vakuf-Uskoplje

Area
  - Total: 2.05 sq mi (5.31 km^{2})

Population (2013)
  - Total: 50
  - Density: 24/sq mi (9.4/km^{2})
- Time zone: UTC+1 (CET)
  - Summer (DST): UTC+2 (CEST)

Kozice is a village in the municipality of Gornji Vakuf, Bosnia and Herzegovina.

== Demographics ==
According to the 2013 census, its population was 50, all Bosniaks.
