= Gaj (Gornji Vakuf) =

- Village
- Location within Bosnia and Herzegovina
- Country: Bosnia and Herzegovina
- Entity: Federation of Bosnia and Herzegovina
- Canton: Central Bosnia
- Municipality: Gornji Vakuf-Uskoplje

Area
  - Total: 0.15 sq mi (0.40 km^{2})

Population (2013)
  - Total: 87
  - Density: 560/sq mi (220/km^{2})
- Time zone: UTC+1 (CET)
  - Summer (DST): UTC+2 (CEST)

Gaj is a village in the municipality of Gornji Vakuf, Bosnia and Herzegovina.

== Demographics ==
According to the 2013 census, its population was 87.

Ethnicity in 2013
Ethnicity	Number	Percentage
Bosniaks	86	98.8%
Croats	1	1.1%
Total	87	100%
