= Smrčevice =

- Village
- Location within Bosnia and Herzegovina
- Coordinates: 43°53′N 17°47′E
- Country: Bosnia and Herzegovina
- Entity: Federation of Bosnia and Herzegovina
- Canton: Central Bosnia
- Municipality: Gornji Vakuf-Uskoplje

Area
  - Total: 6.86 sq mi (17.76 km^{2})

Population (2013)
  - Total: 1
  - Density: 0.15/sq mi (0.056/km^{2})
- Time zone: UTC+1 (CET)
  - Summer (DST): UTC+2 (CEST)

Smrčevice is a village in the municipality of Gornji Vakuf, Bosnia and Herzegovina.

== Demographics ==
According to the 2013 census, its population was just 1, a Bosniak.
