= Pajić Polje =

- Village
- Location within Bosnia and Herzegovina
- Coordinates: 43°59′N 17°32′E
- Country: Bosnia and Herzegovina
- Entity: Federation of Bosnia and Herzegovina
- Canton: Central Bosnia
- Municipality: Gornji Vakuf-Uskoplje

Area
  - Total: 0.38 sq mi (0.99 km^{2})

Population (2013)
  - Total: 284
  - Density: 740/sq mi (290/km^{2})
- Time zone: UTC+1 (CET)
  - Summer (DST): UTC+2 (CEST)

Pajić Polje is a village in the municipality of Gornji Vakuf, Bosnia and Herzegovina.

== Demographics ==
According to the 2013 census, its population was 284.

Ethnicity in 2013
Ethnicity	Number	Percentage
Croats	276	97.2%
Bosniaks	4	1.4%
other/undeclared	4	1.4%
Total	284	100%
