= Dobrošin =

- Village
- Location within Bosnia and Herzegovina
- Coordinates: 43°54′N 17°38′E
- Country: Bosnia and Herzegovina
- Entity: Federation of Bosnia and Herzegovina
- Canton: Central Bosnia
- Municipality: Gornji Vakuf-Uskoplje

Area
  - Total: 4.82 sq mi (12.49 km^{2})

Population (2013)
  - Total: 342
  - Density: 70.9/sq mi (27.4/km^{2})
- Time zone: UTC+1 (CET)
  - Summer (DST): UTC+2 (CEST)

Dobrošin is a village in the municipality of Gornji Vakuf, Bosnia and Herzegovina.

== Population ==
Dobrošin
year of census	2013.	1991.	1981.	1971.
Croats	339 (99,1%)	545 (99,81%)	536 (98,89%)	463 (100%)
Serbs	2 (0,6%)	1 (0,18%)	0	0
Muslims (Bosniaks)	0	0	0	0
Yugoslavs		0	0	0
other and unknown	1 (0,3%)	0	6 (1,10%)	0
total	342	546	542	463
