= Borova Ravan =

- Village
- Location within Bosnia and Herzegovina
- Coordinates: 43°51′N 17°41′E
- Country: Bosnia and Herzegovina
- Entity: Federation of Bosnia and Herzegovina
- Canton: Central Bosnia
- Municipality: Gornji Vakuf-Uskoplje

Area
  - Total: 0.42 sq mi (1.10 km^{2})

Population (2013)
  - Total: 84
  - Density: 200/sq mi (76/km^{2})
- Time zone: UTC+1 (CET)
  - Summer (DST): UTC+2 (CEST)

Borova Ravan is a village in the municipality of Gornji Vakuf, Bosnia and Herzegovina.

== Demographics ==
According to the 2013 census, its population was 84, all Bosniaks.
