= Rosulje (Gornji Vakuf) =

- Village
- Location within Bosnia and Herzegovina
- Coordinates: 43°59′33″N 17°31′34″E
- Country: Bosnia and Herzegovina
- Entity: Federation of Bosnia and Herzegovina
- Canton: Central Bosnia
- Municipality: Gornji Vakuf-Uskoplje

Area
  - Total: 0.69 sq mi (1.79 km^{2})
- Elevation: 2,300 ft (700 m)

Population (2013)
  - Total: 40
  - Density: 58/sq mi (22/km^{2})
- Time zone: UTC+1 (CET)
  - Summer (DST): UTC+2 (CEST)

Rosulje is a village in the municipality of Gornji Vakuf, Bosnia and Herzegovina. Rosulje is located at about 700 meters above sea level, on slightly sloping slopes above the Vrbas valley.

== Demographics ==
According to the 2013 census, its population was 40, all Croats.
