= Duratbegov Dolac =

- Village
- Location within Bosnia and Herzegovina
- Coordinates: 43°58′N 17°32′E
- Country: Bosnia and Herzegovina
- Entity: Federation of Bosnia and Herzegovina
- Canton: Central Bosnia
- Municipality: Gornji Vakuf-Uskoplje

Area
  - Total: 5.44 sq mi (14.10 km^{2})

Population (2013)
  - Total: 986
  - Density: 181/sq mi (69.9/km^{2})
- Time zone: UTC+1 (CET)
  - Summer (DST): UTC+2 (CEST)

Duratbegov Dolac is a village in the municipality of Gornji Vakuf, Bosnia and Herzegovina.

== Demographics ==
According to the 2013 census, its population was 986.

Ethnicity in 2013
Ethnicity	Number	Percentage
Bosniaks	753	76.4%
Croats	229	23.2%
other/undeclared	4	0.4%
Total	986	100%
