= Dražev Dol =

- Village
- Location within Bosnia and Herzegovina
- Coordinates: 43°59′N 17°31′E
- Country: Bosnia and Herzegovina
- Entity: Federation of Bosnia and Herzegovina
- Canton: Central Bosnia
- Municipality: Gornji Vakuf-Uskoplje

Area
  - Total: 1.14 sq mi (2.94 km^{2})

Population (2013)
  - Total: 591
  - Density: 521/sq mi (201/km^{2})
- Time zone: UTC+1 (CET)
  - Summer (DST): UTC+2 (CEST)

Dražev Dol is a village in the municipality of Gornji Vakuf, Bosnia and Herzegovina.

== Demographics ==
According to the 2013 census, its population was 591.

Ethnicity in 2013
Ethnicity	Number	Percentage
Bosniaks	576	97.5%
Croats	12	2.0%
other/undeclared	3	0.5%
Total	591	100%
