= Zastinje, Gornji Vakuf-Uskoplje =

Zastinje
- Village
- Location within Bosnia and Herzegovina
- Coordinates: 43°52′33″N 17°40′30″E
- Country: Bosnia and Herzegovina
- Entity: Federation of Bosnia and Herzegovina
- Canton: Central Bosnia
- Municipality: Gornji Vakuf-Uskoplje

Area
  - Total: 1.30 sq mi (3.37 km^{2})

Population (2013)
  - Total: 314
  - Density: 241/sq mi (93.2/km^{2})
- Time zone: UTC+1 (CET)
  - Summer (DST): UTC+2 (CEST)

Zastinje is a village in the municipality of Gornji Vakuf, Bosnia and Herzegovina.

== Demographics ==
According to the 2013 census, its population was 314.

Ethnicity in 2013
| Ethnicity | Number | Percentage |
|---|---|---|
| Bosniaks | 310 | 98.7% |
| other/undeclared | 4 | 1.3% |
| Total | 314 | 100% |
