= Vrse =

- Village
- Location within Bosnia and Herzegovina
- Country: Bosnia and Herzegovina
- Entity: Federation of Bosnia and Herzegovina
- Canton: Central Bosnia
- Municipality: Gornji Vakuf-Uskoplje

Area
  - Total: 5.76 sq mi (14.92 km^{2})

Population (2013)
  - Total: 710
  - Density: 120/sq mi (48/km^{2})
- Time zone: UTC+1 (CET)
  - Summer (DST): UTC+2 (CEST)

Vrse is a village in the municipality of Gornji Vakuf, Bosnia and Herzegovina.

== Demographics ==
According to the 2013 census, its population was 710.

Ethnicity in 2013
Ethnicity	Number	Percentage
Bosniaks	645	90.8%
Croats	61	8.6%
other/undeclared	4	0.6%
Total	710	100%
