= Boljkovac =

- Village
- Location within Bosnia and Herzegovina
- Coordinates: 43.8864°N 17.6639°E
- Country: Bosnia and Herzegovina
- Entity: Federation of Bosnia and Herzegovina
- Canton: Central Bosnia
- Municipality: Gornji Vakuf-Uskoplje

Area
  - Total: 2.28 km^{2} (0.88 sq mi)

Population (2013)
  - Total: 322
  - Density: 141/km^{2} (366/sq mi)
- Time zone: UTC+1 (CET)
  - Summer (DST): UTC+2 (CEST)

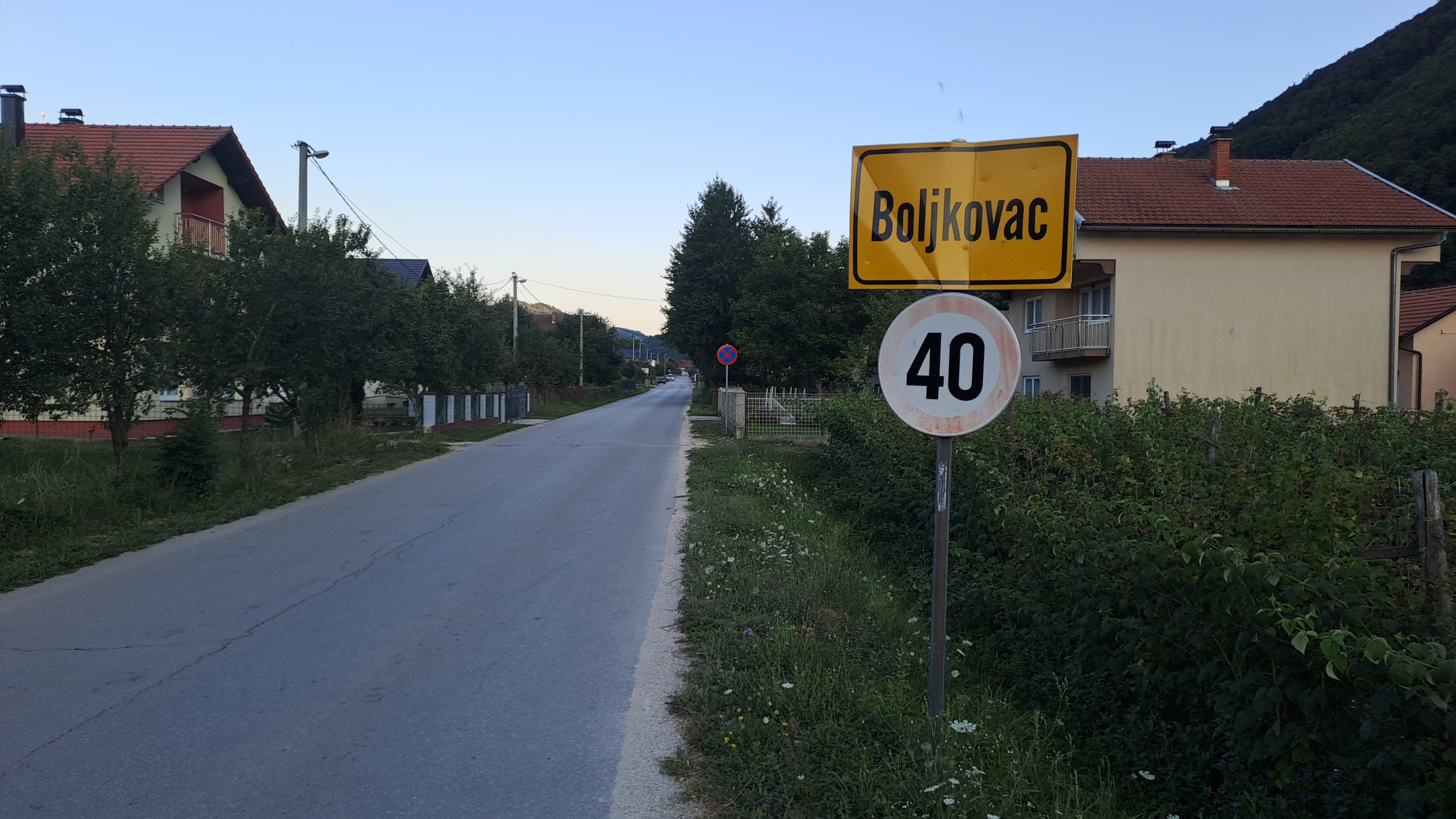
A Boljkovac street sign

Boljkovac is a village in the municipality of Gornji Vakuf, Bosnia and Herzegovina.

== Demographics ==
According to the 2013 census, its population was 322.

Ethnicity in 2013
Ethnicity	Number	Percentage
Bosniaks	321	99.7%
other/undeclared	1	0.3%
Total	322	100%
