= Voljevac (Gornji Vakuf) =

- Village
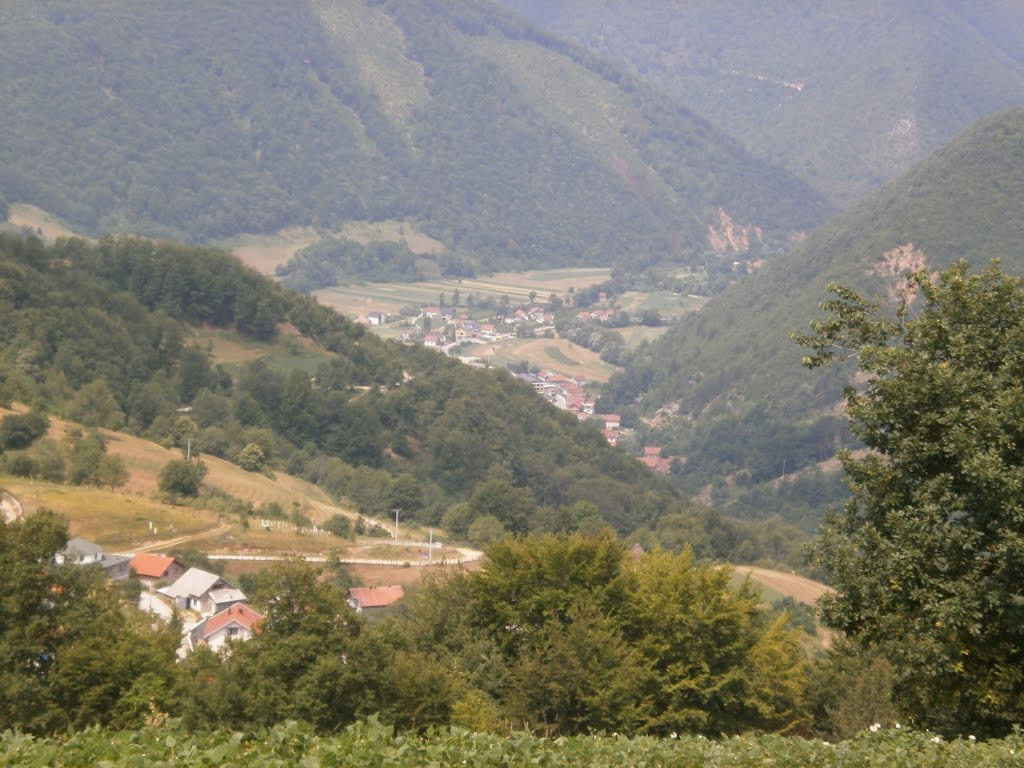
- View of Voljevac Landscape

- Location within Bosnia and Herzegovina
- Country: Bosnia and Herzegovina
- Entity: Federation of Bosnia and Herzegovina
- Canton: Central Bosnia
- Municipality: Gornji Vakuf-Uskoplje

Area
  - Total: 1.78 sq mi (4.60 km^{2})

Population (2013)
  - Total: 688
  - Density: 387/sq mi (150/km^{2})
- Time zone: UTC+1 (CET)
  - Summer (DST): UTC+2 (CEST)

Voljevac is a village in the municipality of Gornji Vakuf, Bosnia and Herzegovina.

== Demographics ==
According to the 2013 census, its population was 688.

Ethnicity in 2013
Ethnicity	Number	Percentage
Bosniaks	676	98.3%
other/undeclared	12	1.7%
Total	688	100%
