= Jagnjid =

- Village
- Location within Bosnia and Herzegovina
- Coordinates: 43°56′N 17°32′E
- Country: Bosnia and Herzegovina
- Entity: Federation of Bosnia and Herzegovina
- Canton: Central Bosnia
- Municipality: Gornji Vakuf-Uskoplje

Area
  - Total: 2.14 sq mi (5.54 km^{2})

Population (2013)
  - Total: 304
  - Density: 142/sq mi (54.9/km^{2})
- Time zone: UTC+1 (CET)
  - Summer (DST): UTC+2 (CEST)

Jagnjid is a village in the municipality of Gornji Vakuf, Bosnia and Herzegovina.

== Demographics ==
According to the 2013 census, its population was 304.

Ethnicity in 2013
Ethnicity	Number	Percentage
Bosniaks	288	94.7%
Croats	15	4.9%
other/undeclared	1	0.3%
Total	304	100%
