= Grnica =

- Village
- Location within Bosnia and Herzegovina
- Coordinates: 43°59′N 17°34′E
- Country: Bosnia and Herzegovina
- Entity: Federation of Bosnia and Herzegovina
- Canton: Central Bosnia
- Municipality: Gornji Vakuf-Uskoplje

Area
  - Total: 4.30 sq mi (11.14 km^{2})

Population (2013)
  - Total: 710
  - Density: 170/sq mi (64/km^{2})
- Time zone: UTC+1 (CET)
  - Summer (DST): UTC+2 (CEST)

Grnica is a village in the municipality of Gornji Vakuf, Bosnia and Herzegovina.

== Demographics ==
According to the 2013 census, its population was 710.

Ethnicity in 2013
Ethnicity	Number	Percentage
Bosniaks	707	99.6%
other/undeclared	3	0.4%
Total	710	100%
