= Osredak (Gornji Vakuf) =

- Village
- Location within Bosnia and Herzegovina
- Coordinates: 43°55′00″N 17°31′25″E
- Country: Bosnia and Herzegovina
- Entity: Federation of Bosnia and Herzegovina
- Canton: Central Bosnia
- Municipality: Gornji Vakuf-Uskoplje

Area
  - Total: 0.93 sq mi (2.42 km^{2})

Population (2013)
  - Total: 438
  - Density: 469/sq mi (181/km^{2})
- Time zone: UTC+1 (CET)
  - Summer (DST): UTC+2 (CEST)

Osredak is a village in the municipality of Gornji Vakuf, Bosnia and Herzegovina.

== Demographics ==
According to the 2013 census, its population was 438.

Ethnicity in 2013
Ethnicity	Number	Percentage
Bosniaks	433	98.9%
other/undeclared	5	1.1%
Total	438	100%
