= Donja Ričica =

- Village
- Location within Bosnia and Herzegovina
- Coordinates: 43°59′N 17°32′E
- Country: Bosnia and Herzegovina
- Entity: Federation of Bosnia and Herzegovina
- Canton: Central Bosnia
- Municipality: Gornji Vakuf-Uskoplje

Area
  - Total: 0.61 sq mi (1.57 km^{2})

Population (2013)
  - Total: 337
  - Density: 556/sq mi (215/km^{2})
- Time zone: UTC+1 (CET)
  - Summer (DST): UTC+2 (CEST)

Donja Ričica is a village in the municipality of Gornji Vakuf, Bosnia and Herzegovina.

== Demographics ==
According to the 2013 census, its population was 337.

Ethnicity in 2013
Ethnicity	Number	Percentage
Croats	333	98.8%
Serbs	2	0.6%
other/undeclared	2	0.6%
Total	337	100%
