= Svilići =

- Village
- Location within Bosnia and Herzegovina
- Coordinates: 43°54′N 17°42′E
- Country: Bosnia and Herzegovina
- Entity: Federation of Bosnia and Herzegovina
- Canton: Central Bosnia
- Municipality: Gornji Vakuf-Uskoplje

Area
  - Total: 3.29 sq mi (8.51 km^{2})

Population (2013)
  - Total: 162
  - Density: 49.3/sq mi (19.0/km^{2})
- Time zone: UTC+1 (CET)
  - Summer (DST): UTC+2 (CEST)

Svilići is a village in the municipality of Gornji Vakuf, Bosnia and Herzegovina.

== Demographics ==
According to the 2013 census, its population was 162, all Bosniaks.
