= Wayne Edwards (British Army soldier) =

British soldier

- Born: 1966; Cefn Mawr, Wales
- Died: 13 January 1993 (aged 26); Gornji Vakuf-Uskoplje, Bosnia
- Burial place: Rhosymedre, Wales
- Military career
- Allegiance: United Kingdom
- Branch: British Army; United Nations Protection Force
- Service years: 1984–93
- Rank: Lance corporal
- Nickname: Eddie
- Units: Royal Welch Fusiliers; 1st Battalion, Cheshire Regiment (attached)
- Conflicts: The Troubles (Operation Banner); Bosnian War (Operation Grapple)

Lance Corporal Wayne John Edwards (1966 – 13 January 1993) was a British soldier who served in the Royal Welch Fusiliers. He was the first British serviceman to be killed in Bosnia-Herzegovina. At the time of his death he was attached to the Cheshire Regiment as part of the United Nations Protection Force (UNPROFOR) during Operation Grapple 1. The following day Malcolm Rifkind, the defence secretary, announced that a Royal Navy task force would be sent to the Adriatic and that any future attacks on British troops could lead to the immediate deployment of artillery and strike aircraft to counter them. This was the first carrier task force to leave British shores on a military operation since the Falklands War 11 years earlier.

== Early life ==
Edwards was born in Cefn Mawr, near Wrexham, Wales, the son of John Edwards and Barbara Ellis. His father was a British soldier who had served in the Welsh Guards. Edwards joined the Army Cadet Force, a youth organisation with connections to the British Army, aged 13. His stepfather, John Manley, said that Edwards was a popular figure locally, "who used to go out of his way to help others. He would be walking along the lane here and see one of the neighbours struggling to lift something, and he would just jump over the hedge and lift it for them. He was that type of lad. Everybody was his friend in the village. Everybody knew 'Eddie' Edwards." At the age of 11, Edwards had acquired an old motorcycle and developed a passion for mechanics. After leaving school at 16 he became a trainee mechanic for a local garage, where he stayed until he was 18 when he joined the Royal Welch Fusiliers.

== Military career ==
Edwards was promoted to Lance corporal in 1992. After serving two tours of duty with the Army in Northern Ireland, where he had seen one friend killed and another wounded, Edwards deployed to Bosnia-Herzegovina in November 1992, based in Vitez as the driver of a FV510 Warrior infantry fighting vehicle. The attachment arose when the Cheshires asked for volunteers from other regiments within their division, the Prince of Wales', to train as drivers. His stepfather said "He took his army career very seriously. He was so proud to wear that uniform." When told he would be deploying with UNPROFOR "he was apprehensive, but looking forward to it. He said: 'It's my job and I've got to do it, so let's get on with it.' That was him, you know?"

== Death ==
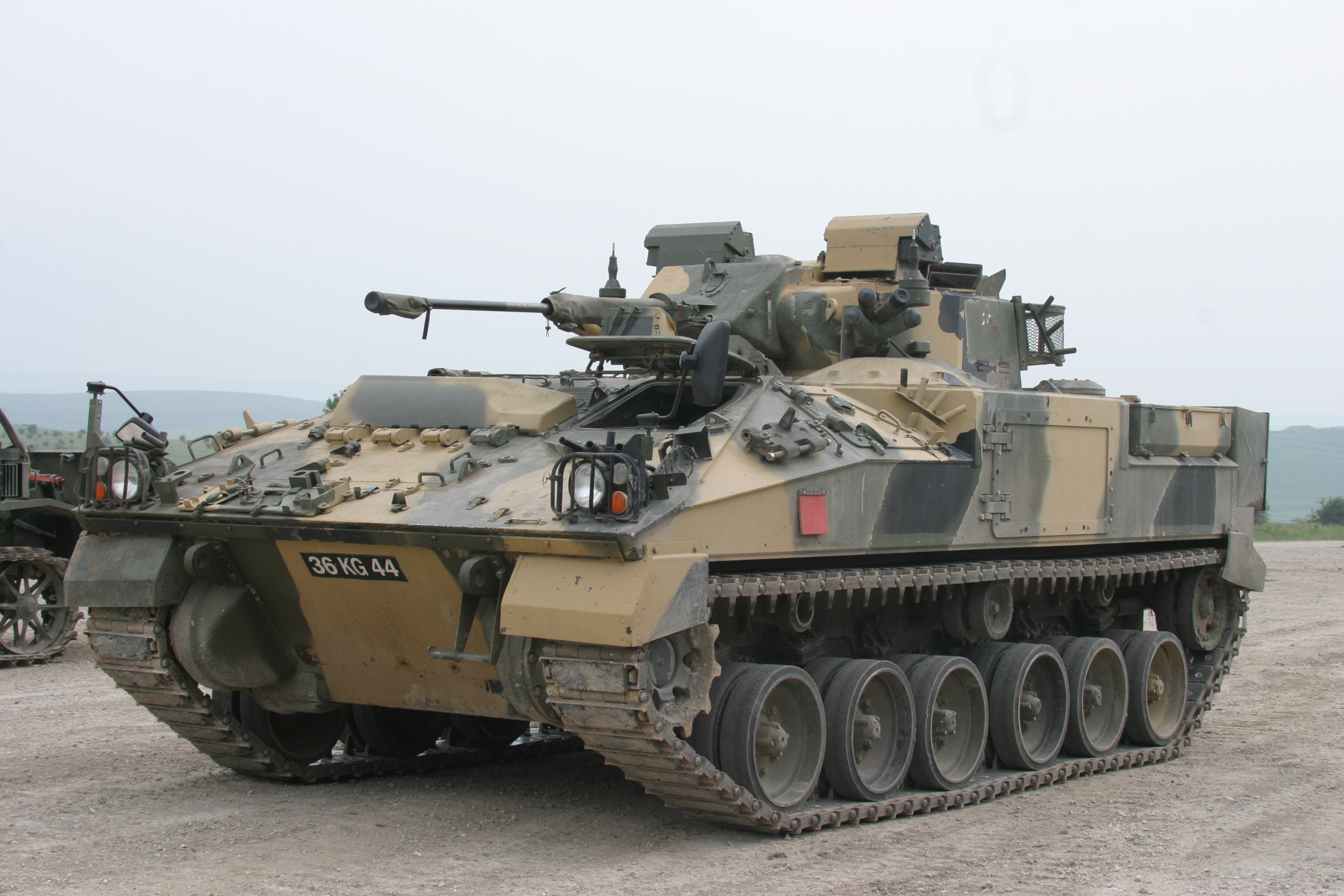
FV510 Warrior. The driver's hatch is located on the front left of the vehicle, shown here in the 'open' position.

The British contingent of UNPROFOR had come under fire on many occasions since the advance party had arrived in October 1992. Warrior patrols to Turbe, near Travnik, were repeatedly shelled, suffering light damage, and a three-mile stretch north of Kladanj on the road to Tuzla was nicknamed "Bomb Alley" because of the regular attacks on UN convoys. In the week leading up to Edwards' death, British forces came under attack on two occasions, first when a Serbian artillery barrage hit the Royal Engineers' headquarters at Tomislavgrad, followed by an ambush against a Danish UN relief convoy returning from Tuzla with an escort of British FV107 Scimitar armoured reconnaissance vehicles from the 9th/12th Royal Lancers, forcing the British to return fire with 30 mm RARDEN cannons.

Edwards' vehicle, commanded by Corporal Alan Furniss, was part of 5 Platoon which operated as the personal escort for Lieutenant Colonel Robert Stewart DSO, the commanding officer of the Cheshires. On 13 January 1993 they escorted him from the British headquarters at Vitez to Gornji Vakuf where he planned to negotiate a ceasefire between the opposing Muslim ARBiH troops and Croat HVO troops. Formerly allied against Serbian forces, they had begun fighting each other the day before. The fighting was blamed on a number of factors, including the "ethnic cleansing" of Muslims from the nearby village of Prozor by HVO forces, troops from outside the area "stirring up trouble", and dissatisfaction among the 56% Muslim majority in the town with the Geneva peace plan, tentatively agreed a week earlier, which would leave Gornji Vakuf in a Croat-controlled canton.

During the negotiations, the British received a request to escort an ambulance carrying three injured civilian women through the town and on to the nearest medical facility. Two Warriors were assigned to protect them, with one positioned at the front of the ambulance and one at the rear. Edwards drove the lead Warrior which left the British base at Gornji Vakuf at 10.30am in the direction of the town centre. Edwards drove with the hatch in the 'open' position for greater visibility. The rear Warrior was also transporting the Regimental Medical Officer, Major Tracy Clarke RAMC. Approximately twelve minutes after leaving the base, as Edwards drove across a bridge, he was struck by a single shot in the head and his Warrior went out of control and mounted the pavement. He was dragged from the vehicle and given first aid while Clarke ran from the rear vehicle to attend him. More Warriors were called from the base and formed a defensive ring as Clarke attempted resuscitation but Edwards had died almost instantly. It is not known who fired the shot.

== Reactions ==
Prime Minister John Major told the House of Commons: "This soldier has lost his life in working to save the lives of many others. No one can make a greater sacrifice. His family have my deepest sympathy in the sorrow they face." On 14 January 1992 Malcolm Rifkind announced that a Royal Navy task force consisting of HMS Ark Royal, HMS Coventry, HMS Brilliant, RFA Argus and RFA Fort Grange would be despatched to the Adriatic. The task force carried eight Harrier jump jets, 17 Sea King helicopters, a battery of six 105 mm light guns, and a total of approximately 2,340 military personnel, mostly Royal Navy. Mr. Rifkind told a press conference that if British troops faced serious attacks, the 105 mm guns would be airlifted into Bosnia by Sea Kings and made ready to respond, and that the task force, which would sit in the Adriatic Sea, could also be used to evacuate British forces if the lives of the soldiers were placed at serious risk.

Lt. Col. Stewart demanded that the Croat and Muslim commanders open a murder enquiry and said: "This is cold-blooded murder and there will be a murder investigation. Lance Corporal Edwards was a UN soldier, and we want the person responsible brought to trial." On 16 January 1993 Stewart managed to broker a temporary ceasefire in Gornji Vakuf so that a wreath could be laid at the spot where Edwards was killed. At 2.00pm both sides paused hostilities while four Warriors drove to the bridge. Accompanying the British troops at the ceremony were the commanders of the BiH and HVO units. Cpl. Furniss tied a wreath of yellow and red carnations and pine branches, spelling out the name 'Ed', to the bridge. After a minute's silence the BiH and HVO commanders saluted and the British withdrew. Hostilities recommenced minutes later.

Edwards' death prompted the Armed Forces Financial Advisory Services to relaunch its 'Forces Safeguard' life insurance policy for members of the Armed Forces on active service.

His funeral was held at St. John's Church, Rhosymedre, Wales on 25 January 1993. In May 1993 Edwards' mother attended the parade at the Cheshires' home base in Germany where medals for service were awarded. She was presented with her son's United Nations Medal by Lt. Col. Stewart. In November 2010, Edwards' sister was presented with the Elizabeth Cross, awarded to the next of kin of members of the Armed Forces killed in action after the Second World War.

== Inquest ==
On 15 June 1993 the jury at Edwards' inquest, held in Wrexham, returned a verdict of unlawful killing. Lt. Col. Stewart said in a statement read to the hearing that he believed the murderer would never be caught, and that "Since the incident I have been to a number of meetings of the local commanders of the Muslim and Croatian armies to try and negotiate peace in Gornji Vakuf. During those meetings I have told both sides that the British Army will be treating L/Cpl Edwards' death as murder." John Hughes, the South Clwyd coroner said: "This is a terribly tragic case of a young man of 26 who went to serve Queen and country in a peacekeeping capacity, not to fight. He had gone to serve the United Nations in a country torn apart by civil war and has met an untimely death."

== Legacy ==
External videos
- "Bridge named after first British soldier killed in Balkans conflict" (4 October 2011) on YouTube. British Forces News coverage of the renaming ceremony. BFBS British Forces News Official channel. (Flash Video.)

On 1 October 2011, as a tribute to him and the other peacekeepers that lost their lives during the conflict, the mayor of Gornji Vakuf-Uskoplje renamed the bridge where Edwards was killed to "Lance Corporal Wayne Edwards Bridge." The official ceremony was attended by Edwards' sister Kimberley, the British ambassador Nigel Casey, Defence Attache Lt.Col. Stephen Croft and Col. Robert Stewart.

== In popular culture ==
The 1999 British television drama Warriors, written by Leigh Jackson and directed by Peter Kosminsky, retold British soldiers' experiences during Operation Grapple using real events but with fictional characters. Edwards was renamed Private Peter "Skeeter" Skeet for the programme and was portrayed by actor Darren Morfitt.
