= Cvrče =

- Village
- Location within Bosnia and Herzegovina
- Coordinates: 43°51′N 17°42′E
- Country: Bosnia and Herzegovina
- Entity: Federation of Bosnia and Herzegovina
- Canton: Central Bosnia
- Municipality: Gornji Vakuf-Uskoplje

Area
  - Total: 3.34 sq mi (8.64 km^{2})

Population (2013)
  - Total: 183
  - Density: 54.9/sq mi (21.2/km^{2})
- Time zone: UTC+1 (CET)
  - Summer (DST): UTC+2 (CEST)

Cvrče is a village in the municipality of Gornji Vakuf, Bosnia and Herzegovina.

== Demographics ==
According to the 2013 census, its population was 183, all Bosniaks.
