= Pidriš =

- Village
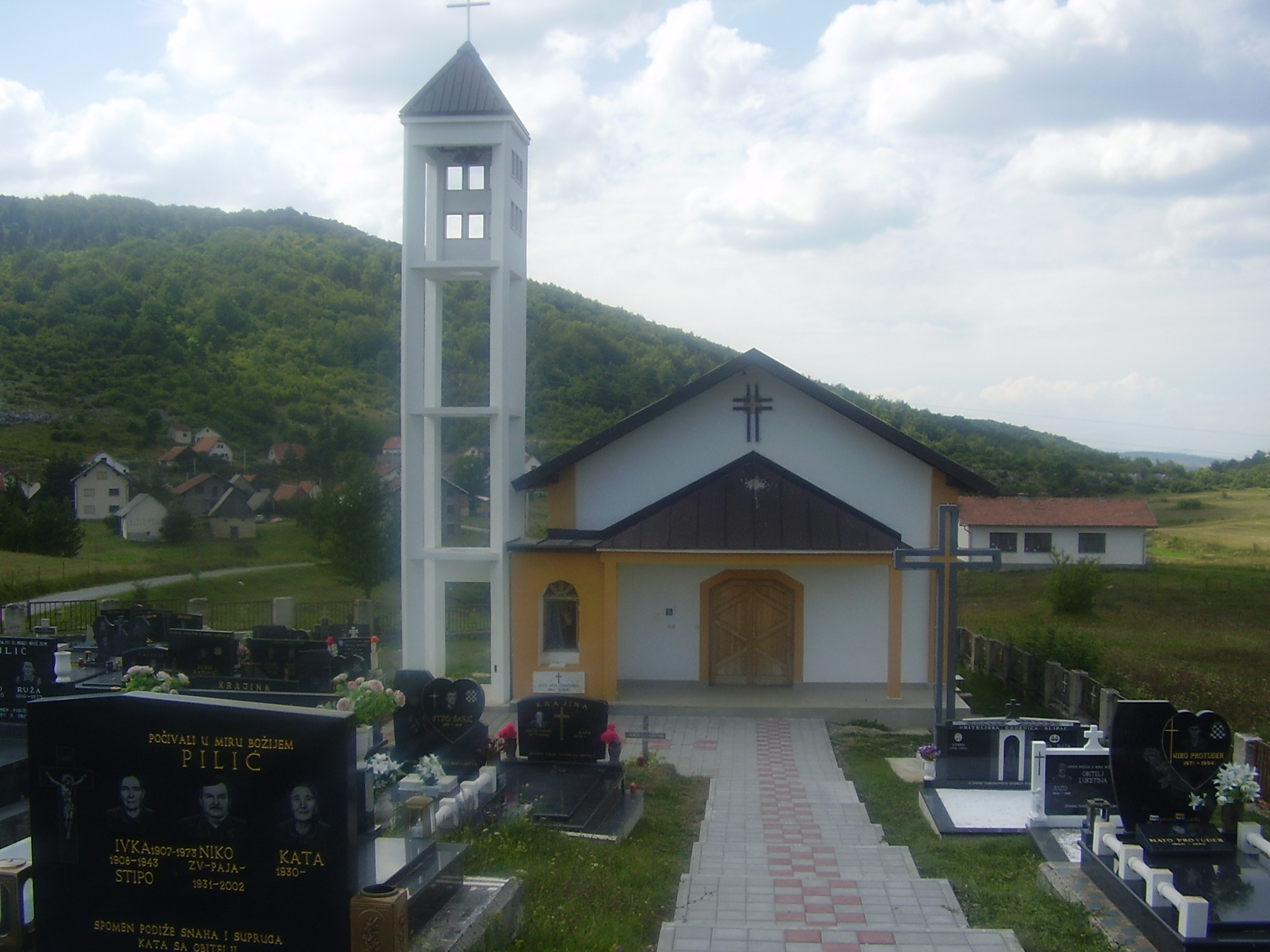
- Church of Pidriš, Uskoplje

- Location within Bosnia and Herzegovina
- Country: Bosnia and Herzegovina
- Entity: Federation of Bosnia and Herzegovina
- Canton: Central Bosnia
- Municipality: Gornji Vakuf-Uskoplje

Area
  - Total: 4.85 sq mi (12.57 km^{2})

Population (2013)
  - Total: 307
  - Density: 63.3/sq mi (24.4/km^{2})
- Time zone: UTC+1 (CET)
  - Summer (DST): UTC+2 (CEST)

Pidriš is a village in the municipality of Gornji Vakuf, Bosnia and Herzegovina.

== Demographics ==
According to the 2013 census, its population was 307, all Croats.
