= Pridvorci, Gornji Vakuf-Uskoplje =

Pridvorci
- Village
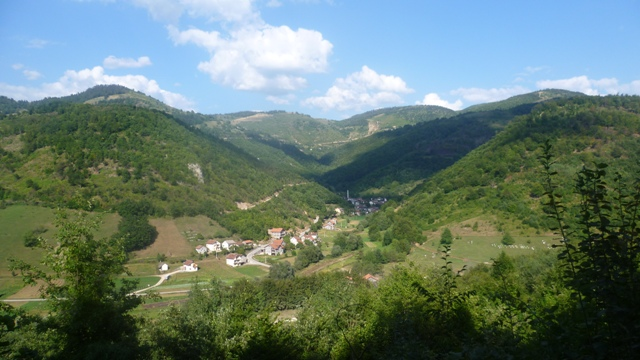
- View of Village Pridvorci

- Location within Bosnia and Herzegovina
- Coordinates: 43°50′58″N 17°40′56″E
- Country: Bosnia and Herzegovina
- Entity: Federation of Bosnia and Herzegovina
- Canton: Central Bosnia
- Municipality: Gornji Vakuf-Uskoplje

Area
  - Total: 4.00 sq mi (10.37 km^{2})

Population (2013)
  - Total: 297
  - Density: 74.2/sq mi (28.6/km^{2})
- Time zone: UTC+1 (CET)
  - Summer (DST): UTC+2 (CEST)

Pridvorci is a village in the municipality of Gornji Vakuf, Bosnia and Herzegovina.

== Demographics ==
According to the 2013 census, its population was 297.

Ethnicity in 2013
Ethnicity	Number	Percentage
Bosniaks	296	99.7%
other/undeclared	1	0.3%
Total	297	100%
