= Hrasnica, Gornji Vakuf-Uskoplje =

Hrasnica
- Village
- Location within Bosnia and Herzegovina
- Coordinates: 43.9694082°N 17.5417832°E
- Country: Bosnia and Herzegovina
- Entity: Federation of Bosnia and Herzegovina
- Canton: Central Bosnia
- Municipality: Gornji Vakuf-Uskoplje

Area
  - Total: 1.16 sq mi (3.01 km^{2})

Population (2013)
  - Total: 178
  - Density: 153/sq mi (59.1/km^{2})
- Time zone: UTC+1 (CET)
  - Summer (DST): UTC+2 (CEST)

Hrasnica is a village in the municipality of Gornji Vakuf, Bosnia and Herzegovina.

== Demographics ==
According to the 2013 census, its population was 178.

Ethnicity in 2013
Ethnicity	Number	Percentage
Bosniaks	101	56.7%
Croats	76	42.7%
other/undeclared	1	0.6%
Total	178	100%
