= Vilić Polje =

- Village
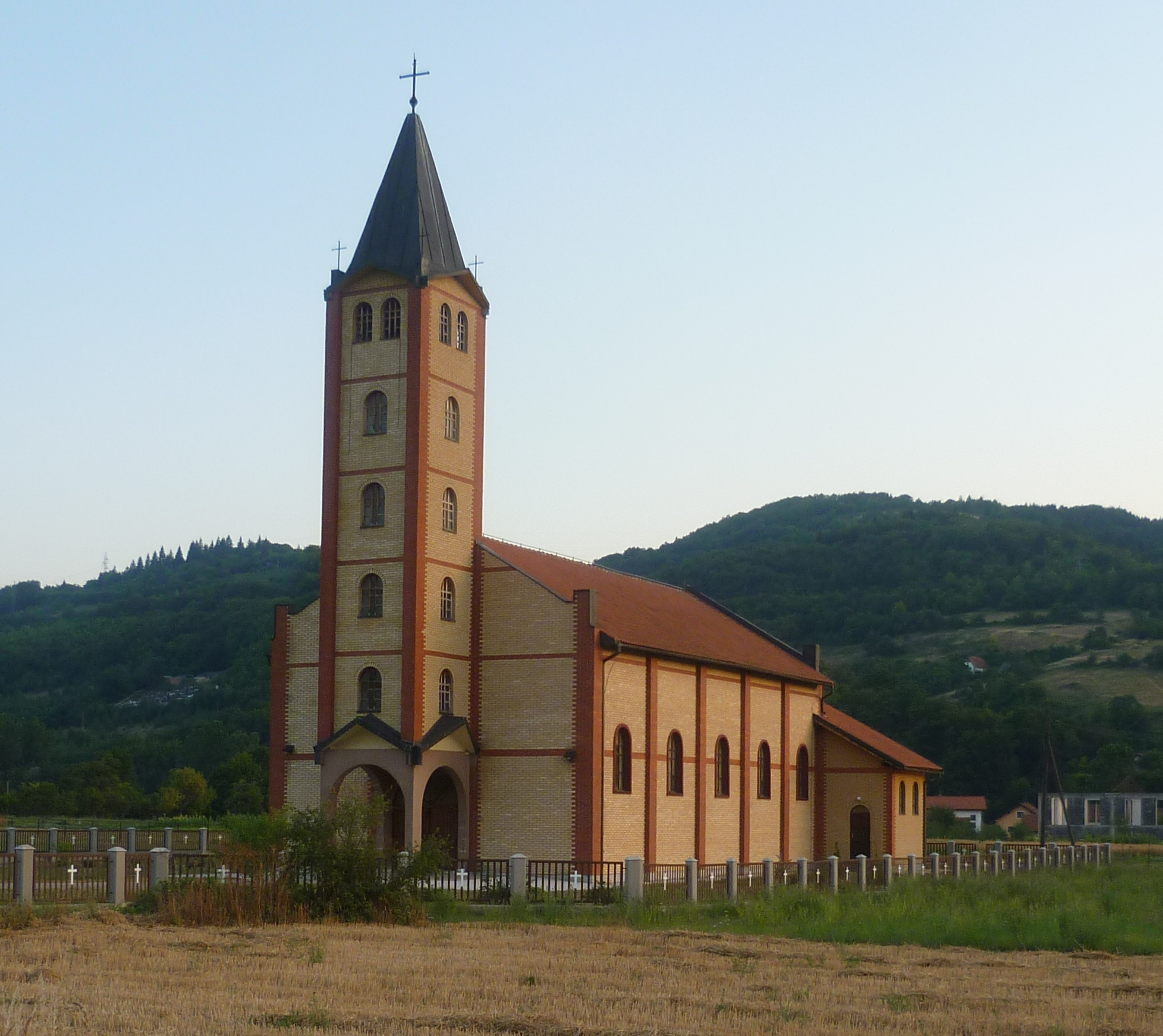
- Church of Vilić Polje, Uskoplje

- Location within Bosnia and Herzegovina
- Country: Bosnia and Herzegovina
- Entity: Federation of Bosnia and Herzegovina
- Canton: Central Bosnia
- Municipality: Gornji Vakuf-Uskoplje

Area
  - Total: 0.75 sq mi (1.95 km^{2})

Population (2013)
  - Total: 803
  - Density: 1,070/sq mi (412/km^{2})
- Time zone: UTC+1 (CET)
  - Summer (DST): UTC+2 (CEST)

Vilić Polje is a village in the municipality of Gornji Vakuf, Bosnia and Herzegovina.

== Demographics ==
According to the 2013 census, its population was 803.

Ethnicity in 2013
Ethnicity	Number	Percentage
Croats	652	77.8%
Bosniaks	166	20.7%
Serbs	3	0.4%
other/undeclared	9	1.1%
Total	803	100%
