= Voljice =

- Village
- Location within Bosnia and Herzegovina
- Coordinates: 43°55′N 17°31′E
- Country: Bosnia and Herzegovina
- Entity: Federation of Bosnia and Herzegovina
- Canton: Central Bosnia
- Municipality: Gornji Vakuf-Uskoplje

Area
  - Total: 10.59 sq mi (27.43 km^{2})

Population (2013)
  - Total: 174
  - Density: 16.4/sq mi (6.34/km^{2})
- Time zone: UTC+1 (CET)
  - Summer (DST): UTC+2 (CEST)

Voljice is a village in the municipality of Gornji Vakuf, Bosnia and Herzegovina.

== Demographics ==
According to the 2013 census, its population was 174, all Bosniaks.
