= Gornji Vakuf-Uskoplje =

Gornji Vakuf-Uskoplje Горњи Вакуф-Ускопље
- Town and municipality
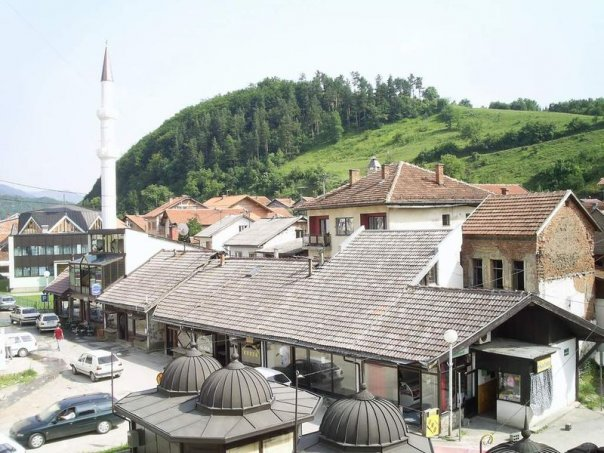

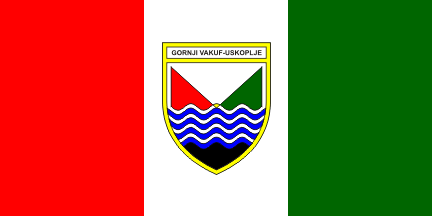
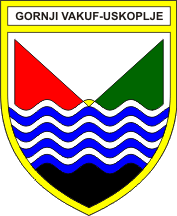
- Flag Coat of arms

- Location of the municipality in Bosnia and Herzegovina

- Location of Gornji Vakuf-Uskoplje
- Coordinates: 43°56′N 17°35′E
- Country: Bosnia and Herzegovina
- Entity: Federation of Bosnia and Herzegovina
- Canton: Central Bosnia

Government
  - Municipal mayor: Esmin Hajdarević (SDA)

Area
  - Total: 402 km^{2} (155 sq mi)

Population (2013 census)
  - Total: 17,237
  - Density: 555/km^{2} (1,440/sq mi)
- Time zone: UTC+1 (CET)
  - Summer (DST): UTC+2 (CEST)
- Area code: +387 30
- Website: gornjivakuf-uskoplje.ba

Gornji Vakuf-Uskoplje (Serbian Cyrillic: Горњи Вакуф-Ускопље) is a town and municipality located in Central Bosnia Canton of the Federation of Bosnia and Herzegovina, an entity of Bosnia and Herzegovina.

== Etymology ==
Although settlements in the area stretch back to prehistoric times, the town with the name Gornji Vakuf arose in the 16th century in the location of the existing settlement called Česta. The name Gornji Vakuf refers to the fact that the town was established as a waqf (in Bosnian: Vakuf; religious trust fund maintained by Muslims working in the financial sector) by the Bosniak nobility. Mehmed-beg Stočanin, a famous Bosniak bey, was the founder of Gornji Vakuf. This town has a typical Bosnian čaršija, which is common within Central Bosnia. The name “Uskoplje” has also been used before the Second World War. Today, both names are used officially to not offend either ethnic group.

== History ==
=== Bosnian War ===
Gornji Vakuf-Uskoplje was made infamous as one of the first towns to suffer from the Croat–Bosniak War (1992–94) during the Bosnian War (1992–95). As a critical node, it was vital for UNPROFOR to hold the line to enable UNHCR supplies to move into the country. It was held by the B Company of Group 1 CHESHIRE from the British Army, which was under command of UNPROFOR. In the early months of 1993, the company lost Lance corporal Wayne Edwards, who was shot by an unknown sniper as they were crossing a bridge in armored personnel carriers. The gunman is still unknown to this day.

Prior to the war, Gornji Vakuf had a population of about 10,000 Croats and 14,000 Bosniaks. On 11 January 1993, the first clashes between the Croatian Defence Council (HVO) and the Army of the Republic of Bosnia and Herzegovina (ARBiH) took place. There are conflicting reports as to how the fighting started and what caused it; either a bomb placed in a Muslim owned hotel used as a headquarters by the ARBiH or an all-out attack by ARBiH forces on HVO positions. The HVO had around 300 forces in the town and 2,000 in the surrounding area, while the ARBiH deployed several brigades of its 3rd Corps which was operating within the area. A front line was established through the center of the town. HVO artillery fired from several positions on the hills to the southeast of ARBiH forces in Gornji Vakuf after their demands for surrender were rejected until a ceasefire was arranged.

On 1 August 1993, the ARBiH launched an offensive on the HVO in Gornji Vakuf, and won control over most of the town by the following day. The HVO retained control over a Croat neighborhood in the southwest and the ARBiH, lacking necessary reinforcements, could not continue its offensive. The name of the Croat-held part was later changed to Uskoplje. The HVO attempted a counterattack from its positions to the southwest of the town on the 5 of August, however infantry and mortar units in the ARBiH were able to repel the attack. Another attack by the HVO started in September, reinforced with tanks and heavy artillery, but it was also unsuccessful. The Washington Peace Agreement, signed by both warring parties in 1994, subsequently put an end to military operations for either side to take control of the city, and a year later the Bosnian War came to an end.

=== Aftermath ===
As the Dayton Agreement was signed in 1995, the post-war town suffered much damage, but was able to financially restabilize itself by utilizing the tourism sector over the years.

== Settlements ==
- Batuša
- Bistrica
- Bojska
- Boljkovac
- Borova Ravan
- Crkvice
- Cvrče
- Dobrošin
- Donja Ričica
- Dražev Dol
- Duratbegov Dolac
- Duša
- Gaj
- Galičica
- Gornja Ričica
- Gornji Mračaj
- Gornji Vakuf-Uskoplje
- Grnica
- Hrasnica
- Humac
- Jagnjid
- Jelače
- Jelići
- Kozice
- Krupa
- Kute
- Lužani
- Mačkovac
- Mračaj
- Osredak
- Pajić Polje
- Paloč
- Pidriš
- Ploča
- Podgrađe
- Pridvorci
- Rosulje
- Seferovići
- Seoci
- Smrčevice
- Svilići
- Šugine Bare
- Uzričje
- Vaganjac
- Valice
- Vilić Polje
- Voljevac
- Voljice
- Vrse
- Zastinje
- Ždrimci

== Demographics ==
=== 1971 ===
19,344 total

- Bosniaks - 10,482 (54.18%)
- Croats - 8,605 (44.48%)
- Serbs - 141 (0.72%)
- Yugoslavs - 18 (0.09%)
- others - 98 (0.53%)

=== 1991 ===
In the census of 1991, the municipality of Gornji Vakuf-Uskoplje had 25,130 inhabitants: 56.05% Bosniaks, 42.61% Croats, 0.60% Yugoslavs, 0.42% Serbs and 0.31% others.

The town itself had 5,349 residents, of which 61% Bosniaks, 34% Croats, 2% Yugoslavs, 1% Serbs and 1% others.

Ethnicity	Number	Percent (%)
Bosniaks	14,063	55.84%
Croats	10,706	42.51%
Yugoslavs	158	0.62%
others	144	0.60%
Serbs	110	0.43%
TOTAL	25,181	100%

=== 2013 Census ===
Municipality	Nationality						Total
Municipality	Bosniaks	%	Croats	%	Serbs	%	Total
Gornji Vakuf-Uskoplje	12,004	57.34	8,660	41.37	30	0.14	20,933

Page text.

== Sports ==
The town is home to the handball club MRK Sloga Gornji Vakuf - Uskoplje, and football club HNK Sloga Uskoplje .

== Twin towns – sister cities ==
Gornji Vakuf-Uskoplje is twinned with:

- Neuhofen an der Krems, Austria
- Paks, Hungary
- Sancaktepe, Turkey
- Turgutlu, Turkey

== Notable people ==
- Almir Pandžo, handball player
- Branko Mikulić, politician
- Matej Delač, football goalkeeper
- Nihad Alibegović, singer
