= Drvar =

Drvar Дрвар
- Town
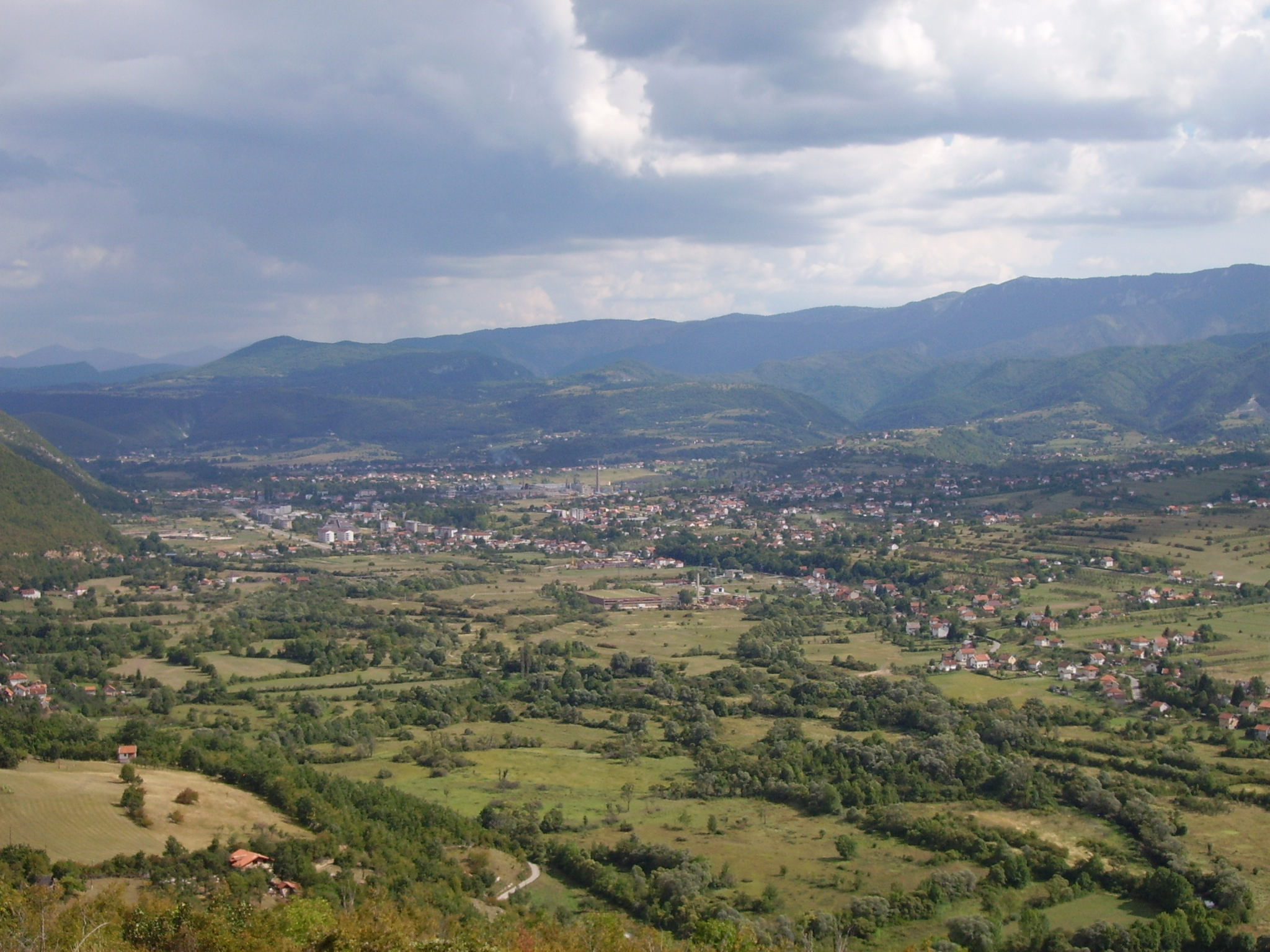
- Drvar
- Interactive map of Drvar
- Coordinates: 44°22′27″N 16°23′04″E
- Country: Bosnia and Herzegovina
- Entity: Federation of Bosnia and Herzegovina
- Canton: Canton 10
- Municipality: Drvar

Area
  - Total: 7.3 km^{2} (2.8 sq mi)

Population (2013 census)
  - Total: 3,730
  - Density: 510/km^{2} (1,300/sq mi)
- Time zone: UTC+1 (CET)
  - Summer (DST): UTC+2 (CEST)
- Area code: +387 34
- Website: www.opstinadrvar.net

Drvar (Serbian Cyrillic: Дрвар, pronounced [dř̩ʋaːr]) is a town and the seat of the Municipality of Drvar in Canton 10 of the Federation of Bosnia and Herzegovina, an entity of Bosnia and Herzegovina. It is situated in western Bosnia and Herzegovina, on the road between Bosansko Grahovo and Bosanski Petrovac, and also near Glamoč.

Drvar lies in a vast valley, the southeastern part of Bosanska Krajina, between the Osječenica, Klekovača, Vijenca and Šator mountains of the Dinaric Alps. The southeastern side of the boundary extends from the Šator over the Jadovnik, the Ujilica and descends to the Lipovo and the Una River.

This extremely hilly region, comprising the town of Drvar and the numerous outlying villages, covers approximately 1,030 square kilometres (400 square miles). The town is mainly situated on the left side of the River Unac, and its elevation is approximately 480 meters (1,574 feet).

== Name ==
The word Drvar stems from the Slavic word drvo which means 'wood'. During the period of SFR Yugoslavia, Drvar was named Titov Drvar in honour of Josip Broz Tito.

== History ==
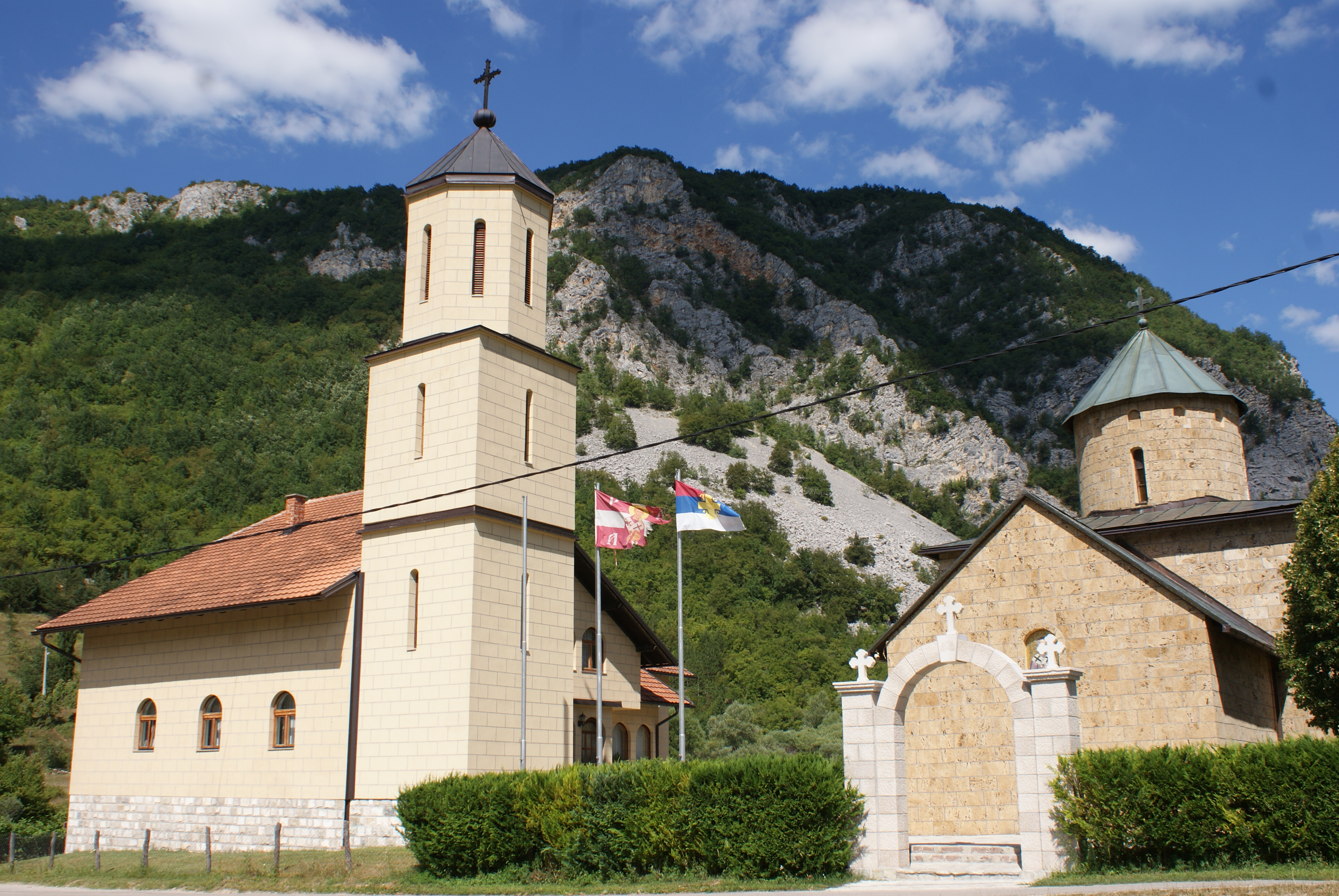
Rmanj Monastery from the 16th century

=== Early history ===
The first writings on Drvar date back to the 9th century. In the first half of the 16th century (approximately 1530) residents of this area, under the leadership of a Vojnović from Glamoč, migrated to the surroundings of Zagreb (Metlika Zumberak and four surrounding villages). The greater area was populated in Roman Times as evidenced by the remains of Roman roads.

=== Austro-Hungarian rule ===
In 1878 Drvar, along with the rest of Bosnia and Herzegovina, was subjugated to Austro-Hungarian rule. Around 1893 German industrialist Otto von Steinbeis leased the right to exploit fir and spruce forests in the mountains of Klekovača, Lunjevače, Srnetica and Osječenica. Steinbeis operated in the area until 1918 when, after the First World War, the company was taken over by the new Yugoslav state. During the 25 years that Steinbeis operated in the area, he created the complete infrastructure for processing forest products including the construction of modern lumber mills in Drvar and Dobrljin, the construction of a network of roads, 400 km of a narrow-gauge railway, telephone and telegraph lines.

During this time Drvar grew into an industrial town employing approximately 2,800 people.

=== Kingdom of Yugoslavia ===
In 1918 the Austro-Hungarian Empire collapsed, which was then followed by the rise of the Kingdom of Serbs, Croats and Slovenes.

From 1929 to 1941, Drvar was part of the Vrbas Banovina of the Kingdom of Yugoslavia. In 1932, an economic crisis resulted in the layoff of 2,000 workers.

=== World War II ===
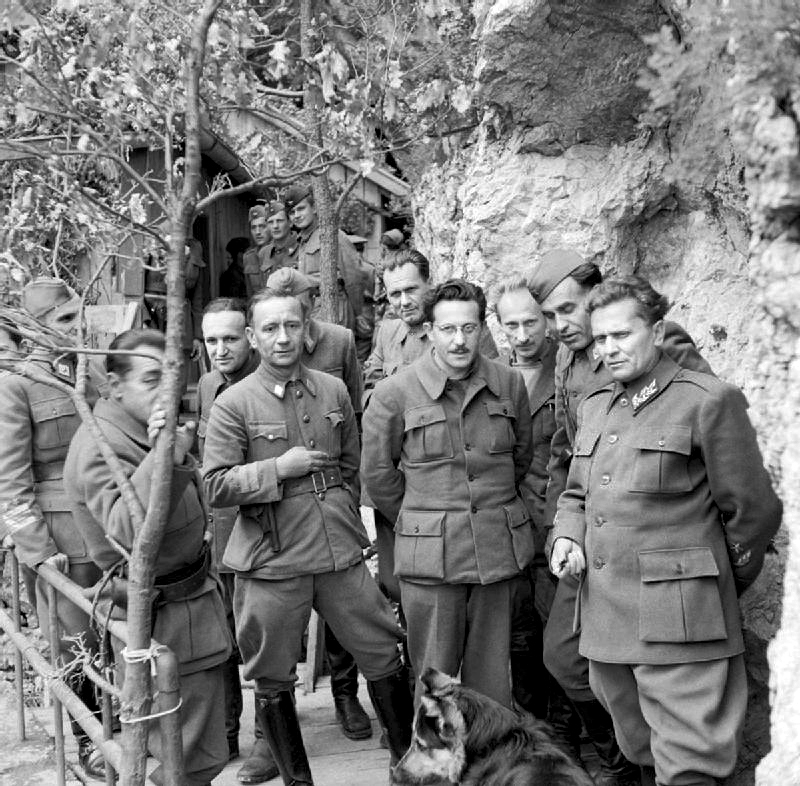
Marshal Tito (right) with his cabinet in Drvar, 1944

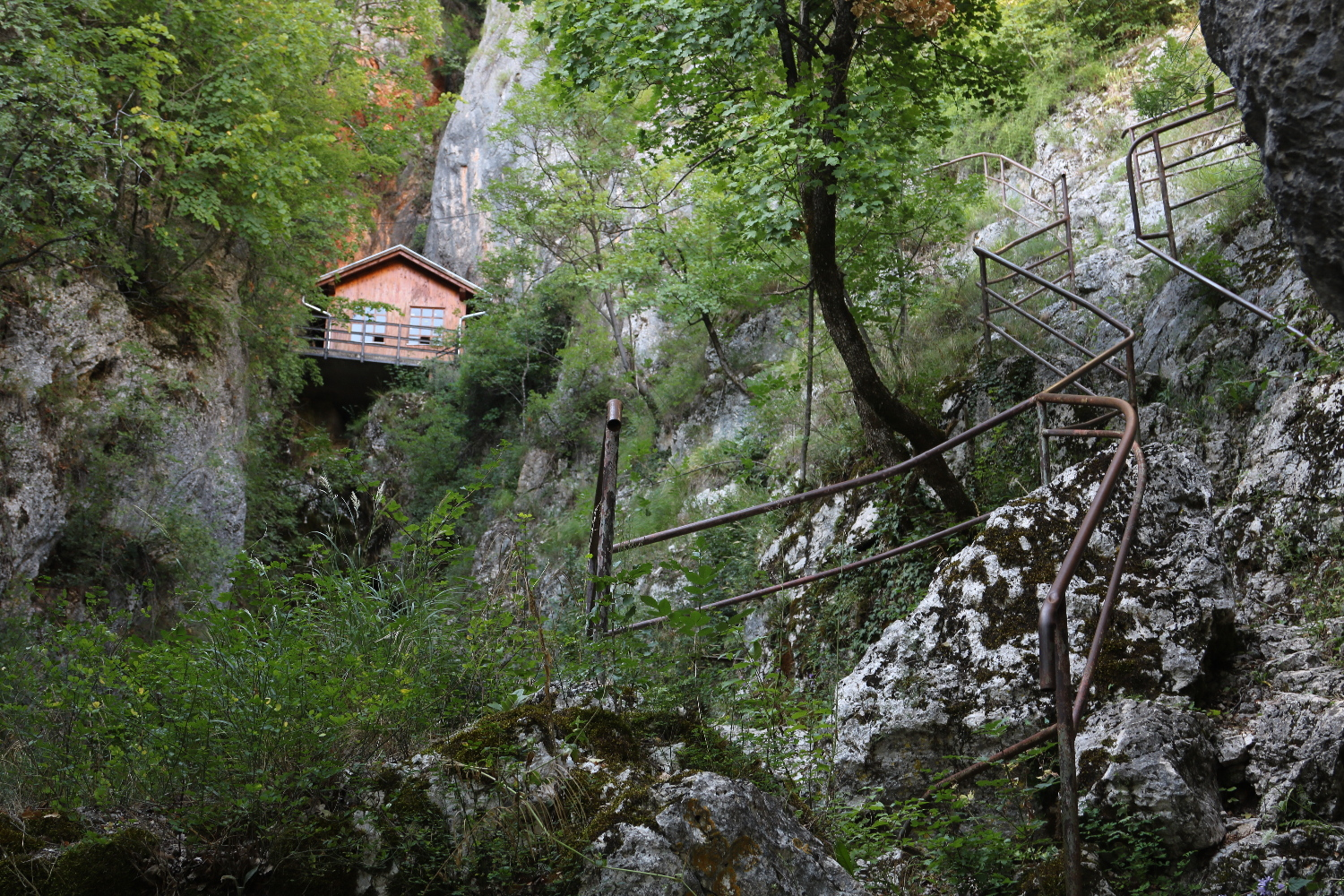
Tito's cave headquarters

On 10 April, the Axis-aligned Ustaše, declared the Independent State of Croatia (NDH) and claimed as part of its territory the entire area of Bosnia and Herzegovina. In Drvar, this resulted in the beginning of the presence of the Ustaše government, the movement chiefly responsible for the World War II Holocaust in the Independent State of Croatia and genocide of Serbs. After the Ustaše imprisoned all Serb men from Drvar during June and July 1941, they began with the preparation to imprison and kill all Serbs from Drvar, regardless of their age and sex, including all women and children.

The genocidal activities of the Ustaše forced the targeted Serb population to organize an uprising known as Drvar uprising, beginning on 27 July 1941. The rebels were organized into the Kamenički, Javorje, Crljivičko-zaglavički, Boboljusko-cvjetnički, Trubarski, Mokronog and Tičevski and Grahovsko-resanovski guerrilla detachments (from the Grahovo area). During the summer of 1941, part of the rebels that included Chetniks expelled and killed the Croat (mostly Catholic) civilians in the Drvar area. The most significant event was the Trubar massacre, a civilian massacre on 27 July 1941.

In more recent history, Drvar is perhaps most famous as the location of a daring airdrop raid on Drvar, codenamed "Operation Rösselsprung", on 25 May 1944, by Nazi German invaders, in an attempt to assassinate Tito. Tito, the main Partisan commander, was sheltered in the Partisan General Staff headquarters in what is now called "Tito's Cave" in the hills near Drvar at the time.

Drvar was liberated by the Partisans in May 1945. Nearly 800 of the town's civilians (mostly ethnic-Serbs) were killed, and over 90% of the structures in the town were completely demolished or burned to the ground.

=== SFR Yugoslavia ===
In the years following the war, Drvar was rebuilt, its timber industry restored, and new metal, fabrication, and carpet industries developed. Eventually, electricity was brought to outlying villages. Over time, it became a tourist destination attracting approximately 200,000 visitors a year, primarily to Tito's Cave.

In the mid 1960s, plans for a memorial complex were initiated to honor the fighters and civilians of Drvar who perished during the war. The monument was completed in May 1967.

On November 24, 1981, Drvar changed its name to Titov Drvar.

=== Bosnian War ===
In 1991, in the midst of ethnic tensions in the region and ensuing Bosnian War, the town's name was changed to Drvar.

In September 1995, Drvar, as well as some other municipalities, was taken over by Croatian forces, and the Serb population fled. Many of them moved to Banja Luka. During this period, Drvar was nearly deserted. Leading up to 1995, Drvar was populated almost entirely by Bosnian Serbs. During the Bosnian War between 1992 and 1995, Drvar was controlled by what is now called the Republika Srpska.

On 3 August 1995, the Croatian Armed Forces with the help of Bosnian Croats began shelling Drvar, from the mountain of Šator. Two Drvar citizens were killed and older men and women began to evacuate to Petrovac. One day later, the Croatian Government armed forces began "Operation Storm", called by European Union Special Envoy to the Former Yugoslavia Carl Bildt, "the most efficient ethnic cleansing we've seen in the Balkans". Columns of hundreds of thousands of refugees in cars, on tractors, wagons and on foot began to pass through Drvar as they fled their homes in Croatia. The shelling of the outlying areas of Drvar by the Croatian Government forces had reoccurred and continued for days.

==== Aftermath ====
In late 1995, after the Dayton Peace Accord was signed, Drvar became part of the Federation of Bosnia and Herzegovina, after which Croat politicians enticed up to 6,000 Bosnian Croats, mainly displaced persons from central Bosnia, to move to Drvar, by promising such things as jobs and keys to vacant homes. A further 2,500 Croat HVO troops and their families were stationed there, also occupying the homes of displaced Bosnian Serb citizens. This drastically changed the population and from 1995 to 1999 the population was primarily Croatian.

In 1996, small numbers of Serbs attempted to return to their homes but faced harassment and discrimination by Croats. Nonetheless, they continued to return despite the ongoing looting and burning of their homes from 1996 to 1998.

In 1998, Croat opposition to the return of displaced Bosnian Serb citizens culminated in riots and murders. Buildings and houses were torched, United Nations International Police Task Force personnel, SFOR personnel and Mayor, Mile Marceta (elected with Serb refugee votes) were attacked, and two displaced elderly Serbs who had recently returned to Drvar were murdered.

Much of the damage done to the town of Drvar was done not during the war, but during its subsequent occupation by Croat civilians and military personnel as the homes and businesses of displaced Bosnian Serbs attempting to return to Drvar were looted and burned. The local government and companies, the few that exist, are dominated by the Croats, and Serbs have difficulty finding employment.

=== Modern ===
Since the end of the Bosnian War, about 5,000 Bosnian Serb residents have returned to Drvar. However, unemployment in the town stands at 80% and many residents blame the government of the Federation of Bosnia and Herzegovina for the poor economic situation.

In September 2019, the President of Serbia Aleksandar Vučić made an official visit to Drvar, along with the Serb Member of the Presidency of Bosnia and Herzegovina Milorad Dodik.

Drvar is a member of the Alliance of Serb Municipalities.

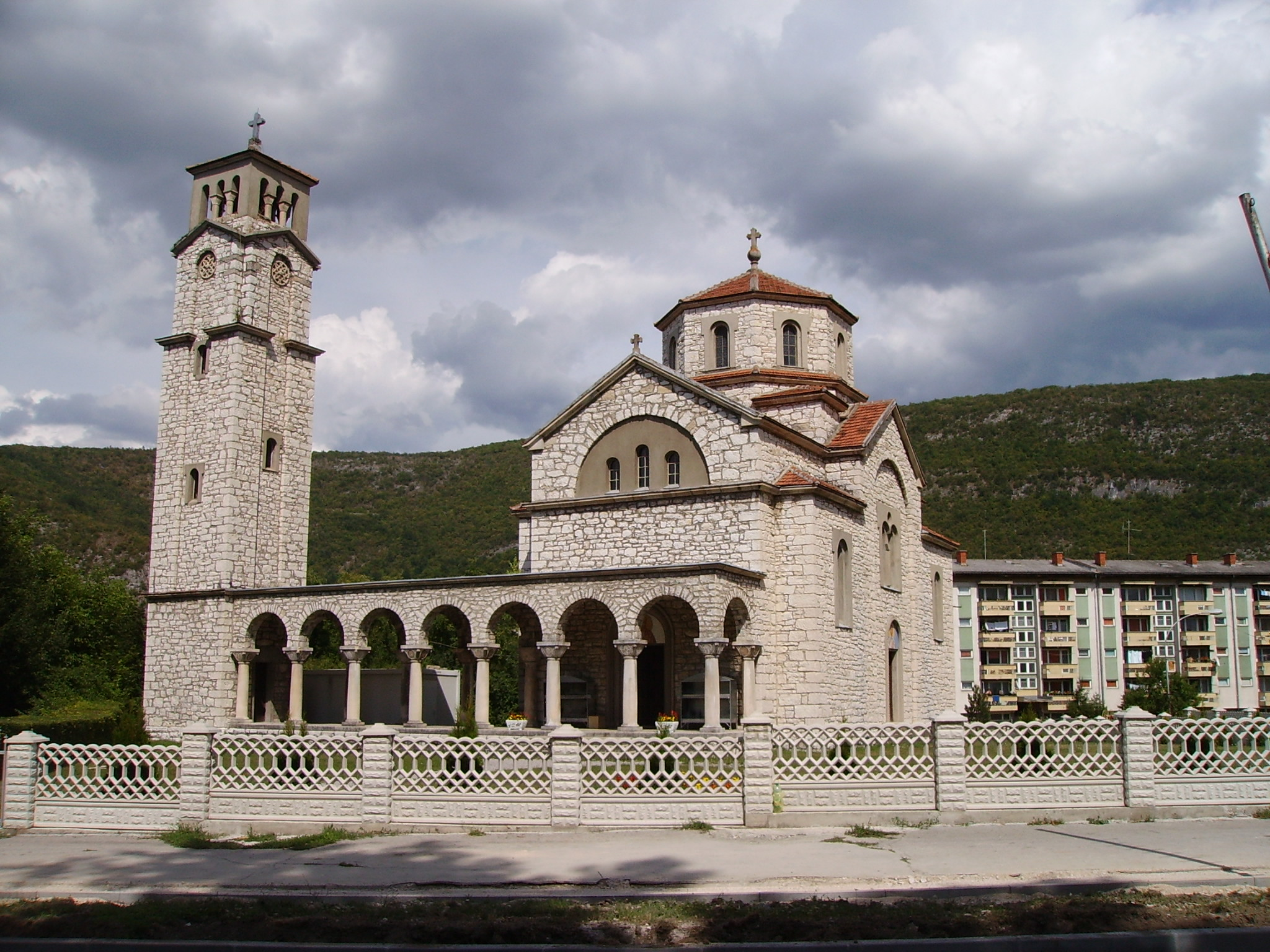
Serbian Orthodox Church

== Settlements ==
Aside from the town of Drvar, the following settlements comprise the municipality:

- Ataševac
- Bastasi
- Brda
- Bunčevac
- Drvar Selo
- Gruborski Naslon
- Kamenica
- Ljeskovica
- Mokronoge
- Motike
- Mrđe
- Podić
- Podovi
- Poljice
- Potoci
- Prekaja
- Šajinovac
- Šipovljani
- Trninić Brijeg
- Trubar
- Vidovo Selo
- Vrtoče
- Zaglavica
- Župa
- Župica

== Demographics ==
Ethnic composition – Drvar town
	2013.	1991.	1981.	1971.	1961.
Total	3,730 (100,0%)	8,053 (100,0%)	7,063 (100,0%)	6,417 (100,0%)	3,646 (100,0%)
Serbs	3,160 (84,72%)	7,693 (95,53%)	6,006 (85,03%)	6,056 (94,37%)	3,645 (99,972%)
Croats	527 (14,13%)	24 (0,298%)	42 (0,595%)	98 (1,527%)	95 (2,606%)
Others	33 (0,885%)	48 (0,596%)	18 (0,255%)	50 (0,779%)	35 (0,960%)
Bosniaks	10 (0,268%)	29 (0,360%)	22 (0,311%)	115 (1,792%)	33 (0,905%)
Yugoslavs		259 (3,216%)	961 (13,61%)	66 (1,029%)	18 (0,494%)
Albanians			11 (0,156%)	16 (0,249%)	
Slovenes			3 (0,042%)	7 (0,109%)	
Montenegrins				9 (0,140%)	

== Economy ==
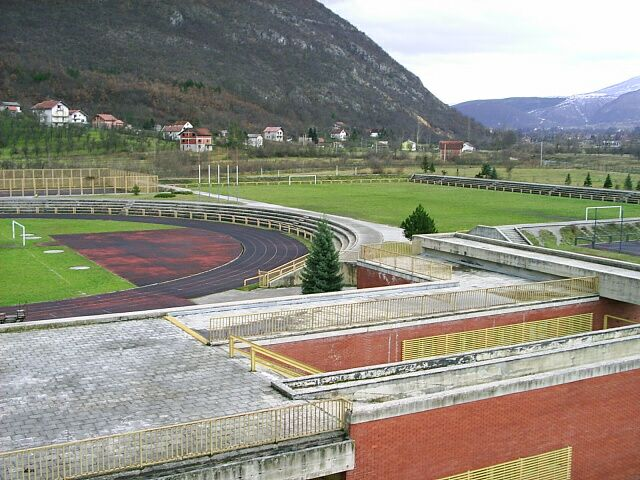
A sports stadium

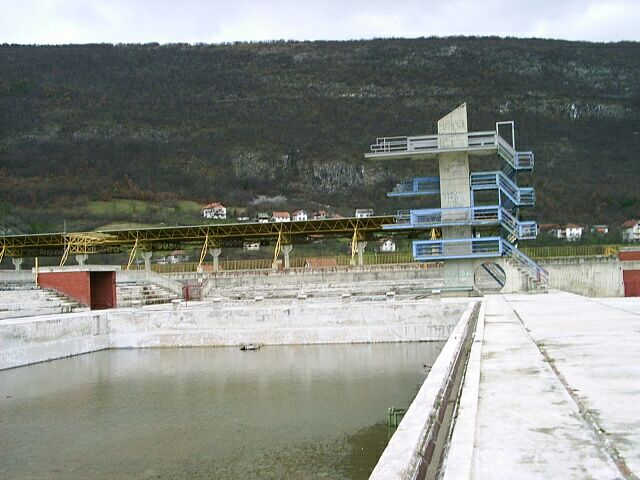
An Olympic pool

Drvar was already well known in the Austrian-Hungarian era due to the high-quality wood coming from that area. The Drvar area is still one of the largest logging and wood-processing environments in BiH. One of the major problems in this area is the widespread corruption connected to this wood-processing industry. It is estimated that during 2004 about 110,000m ^{3} of wood 'disappeared'. Average price of 1m ^{3} of timber (second class) is about 100 BAM (100 Convertible Marks = 49.5 Euros).

== Features ==
Famous landmarks include "Tito's Cave" and the so-called "Citadel". At the latter mentioned location one can find an Austro-Hungarian cemetery (in a very poor state) which may contain an unknown number of German soldiers buried after the attack of 1944. There is also a Roman road sign (~100 AD). Another one can be found on the way to Bosanski Petrovac near Zaglavica.

Drvar is also renowned for its local rakija, a type of plum or cranberry brandy, originating in Serbia but popular all over the Balkans.

== Notable people ==
- Andrea Arsović, sport shooter
- Marija Bursać, National Hero of Yugoslavia
- Nikola Špirić, Former Prime Minister of Bosnia and Herzegovina
- Ilija Kajtez, sociologist, philosopher, educator, writer, and retired officer
- Radomir Kovačević, Olympic medalist in judo
- Dejan Matić, singer
- Saša Matić, singer
- Milan Rodić, professional football player
- Mirko Srdić, musician

== See also ==
- Canton 10

== Sources ==
- Dedijer, Vladimir; Miletić, Antun (1989). Proterivanje Srba sa ognjišta 1941-1944: svedočanstva. Prosveta. ISBN 9788607004508.
