= Operation Rösselsprung (1944) =

German military operation

- Part of World War II in Yugoslavia
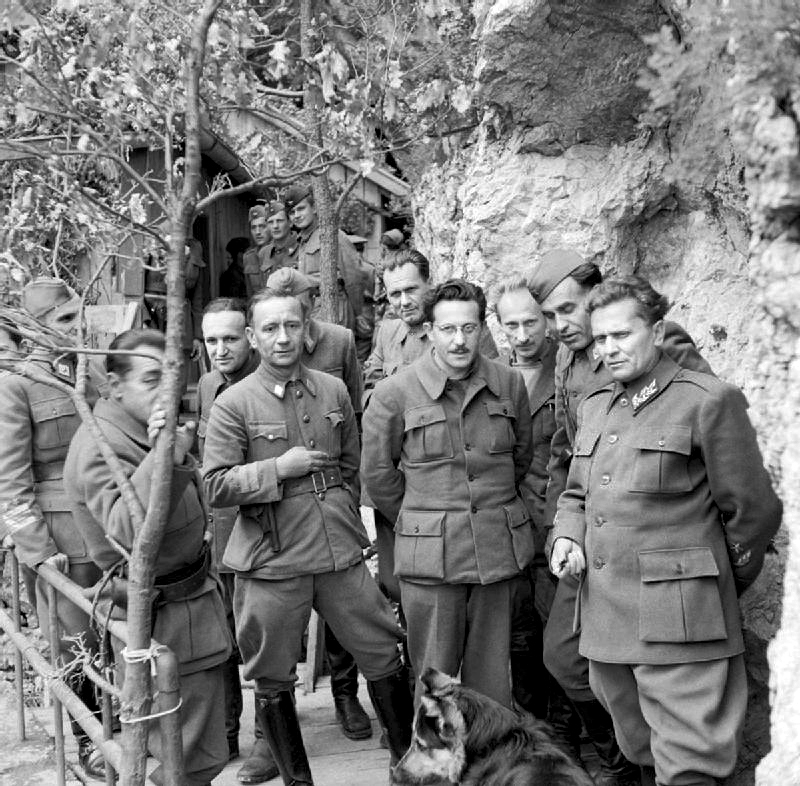
- Marshal Josip Broz Tito (furthest right) with his cabinet and principal staff officers in Drvar, days before the offensive.
Date	25–27 May 1944
Location	Drvar region, Bosnian Krajina, Yugoslavia 44°22′51″N 16°23′14″E
Result	German failure

Belligerents
Axis and collaborationist forces: Germany; Croatia; Chetniks	Allies: Yugoslav Partisans; Balkan Air Force

Commanders and leaders
(Nazi Germany) Lothar Rendulic; (Nazi Germany) Ernst von Leyser; (Nazi Germany) Otto Kumm; (Nazi Germany) Eduard Aldrian; (Nazi Germany) Kurt Rybka	(Yugoslav Partisans) Josip Broz Tito; (Yugoslav Partisans) Koča Popović; (Yugoslav Partisans) Slavko Rodić; (Yugoslav Partisans) Vlado Ćetković; William Elliot

Strength
c. 12,000 German troops, unknown number of NDH and Chetnik troops	c. 12,000–16,000

Casualties and losses
789 killed; 929 wounded; 51 missing	See Aftermath section
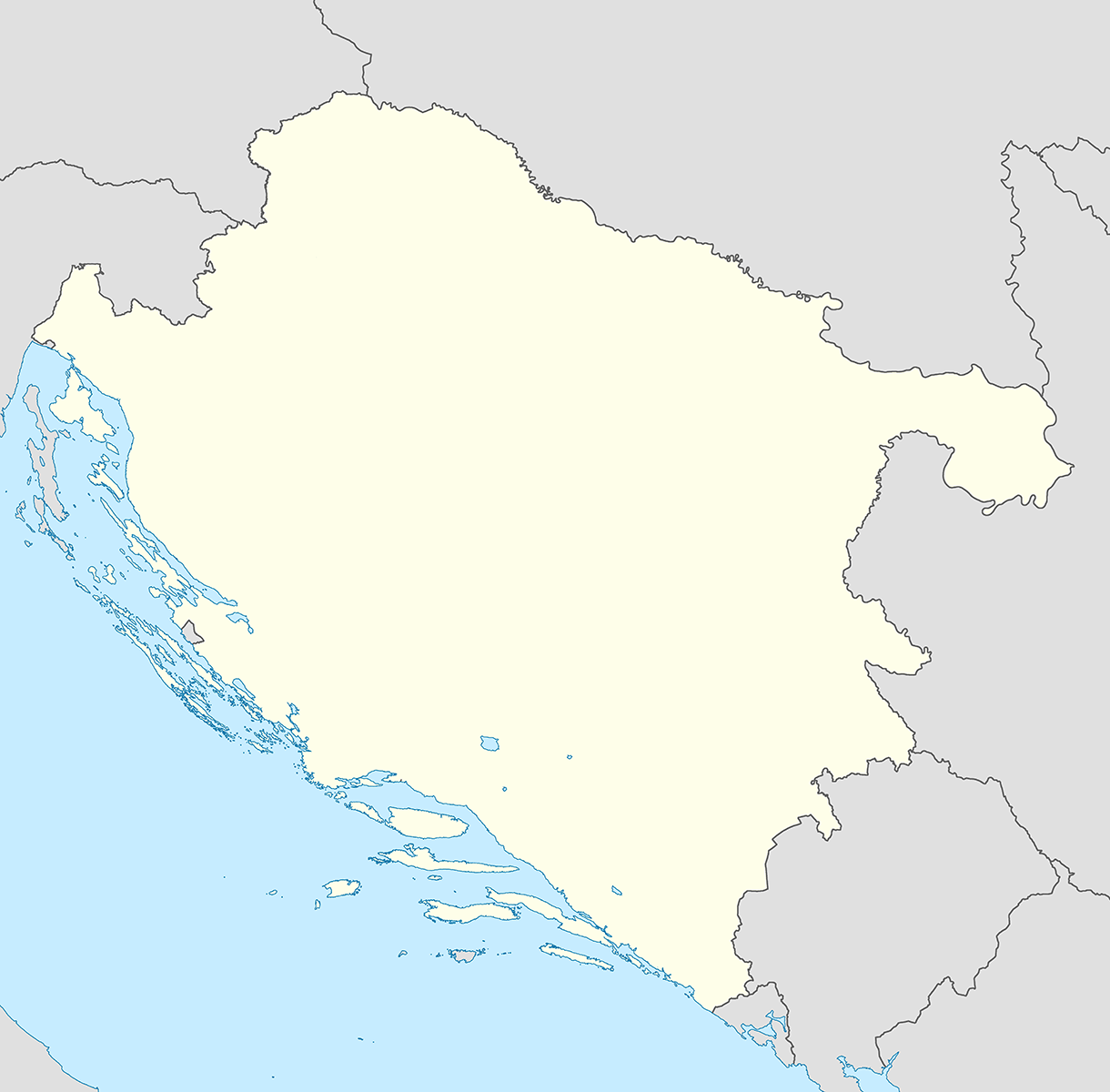
- A map of the Independent State of Croatia showing the location of Drvar

Operation Rösselsprung (German: Unternehmen Rösselsprung, lit. 'Knight's move') was a combined airborne and ground assault by the German XV Mountain Corps and collaborationist forces on the Supreme Headquarters of the Yugoslav Partisans in the Bosnian town of Drvar in the Independent State of Croatia during World War II. It was launched 25 May 1944, with the goal of capturing or killing Partisan leader Marshal Josip Broz Tito and destroying the headquarters, support facilities and co-located Allied military missions. It is associated with the Seventh Enemy Offensive (Serbo-Croatian: Sedma neprijateljska ofenziva) in Yugoslav history, forming part of the Seven Enemy Offensives historiographical framework. The airborne assault itself is also known as the Raid on Drvar (Serbo-Croatian: Desant na Drvar).

Operation Rösselsprung was a coup de main operation, involving direct action by a combined parachute and glider-borne assault by the 500th SS Parachute Battalion and a planned subsequent link-up with ground forces of the XV Mountain Corps converging on Drvar. The airborne assault was preceded by heavy bombing of the town by the Luftwaffe. The ground forces included Home Guard forces of the Independent State of Croatia along with collaborationist Chetniks. Tito, his principal headquarters staff and the Allied military personnel escaped, despite their presence in Drvar at the time of the airborne assault. Fierce Partisan resistance in the town itself and along the approaches to Drvar contributed to the failure of the mission. Other factors included the German intelligence agencies refusing to share the limited information available on Tito's exact location, and the lack of contingency planning by the commander of the German airborne force.

== Background ==
On 6 April 1941 the Axis powers invaded Yugoslavia from multiple directions, rapidly overwhelming the under-prepared Royal Yugoslav Army which capitulated 11 days later. In the aftermath of the invasion Yugoslavia was partitioned between the Axis powers through a combination of annexations and occupation zones. An Axis puppet state known as the Independent State of Croatia (Serbo-Croatian: Nezavisna Država Hrvatska, NDH) was established on the territory of modern-day Croatia and Bosnia and Herzegovina, controlled by the fascist and ultra-nationalist Ustaše. The NDH was divided by a German–Italian demarcation line, known as the "Vienna Line"; the Germans occupied the north and northeastern parts of the NDH, and the Italians the south and southwestern sections. The NDH immediately implemented genocidal policies against the Serb, Jewish, and Romani population of the puppet state.

Following the collapse of Yugoslavia, armed groups appeared, and in the territory of the NDH, while the predominantly Serb resistance to Ustaše rule was initially not strongly aligned with ideology, two principal groups soon established themselves, the communist-led Partisans and the Serb nationalist Chetniks. The Partisans were resolutely anti-Axis throughout the war, but the Chetniks extensively collaborated with Italian occupation forces garrisoned in the NDH from mid-1941, and also with the Germans, especially after the Italian capitulation in September 1943.

The Axis Operation Weiss and Operation Schwarz offensives of the first six months of 1943 caused significant setbacks for the Partisans; however, in September the Partisan leader Josip Broz Tito took advantage of the capitulation of Italy and managed to increase the territory under his control and double his forces to around 200,000 men, arming them with captured Italian weapons. In late November, he held a National Congress at Jajce in a liberated area of the NDH, during which he was designated marshal of Yugoslavia and prime minister. He established his headquarters nearby at Drvar in the Dinaric Alps and temporarily suspended his successful tactic of being constantly on the move. Generalfeldmarschall (Note: Equivalent to a United States general of the army.) Maximilian von Weichs, the Wehrmacht commander-in-chief for Southeast Europe, admitted a few weeks later that "Tito is our most dangerous enemy."

Tito's personal headquarters was initially located in a cave below a ridgeline about 1 km (0.6 mi) north of the centre of Drvar. Below the cave ran the Unac River, creating an obstacle to movement between the town and the cave, and a rail line ran along the ridgeline above the cave. As well as Partisan headquarters, several Partisan and Communist Party support, training and youth organisations were based in and around Drvar at the time, along with the Tito Escort Battalion which was responsible for Tito's personal safety. The British and Soviet military missions to the Partisans were also stationed in villages close to Drvar, as were some United States military officers. The British mission was headed by Brigadier Fitzroy Maclean, who was in London at the time of the raid, and included Major Randolph Churchill, son of Winston Churchill. At the time of Operation Rösselsprung (German: Unternehmen Rösselsprung), the British mission was led by its second-in-command, Lieutenant Colonel Vivian Street.

=== Partisan dispositions around Drvar ===
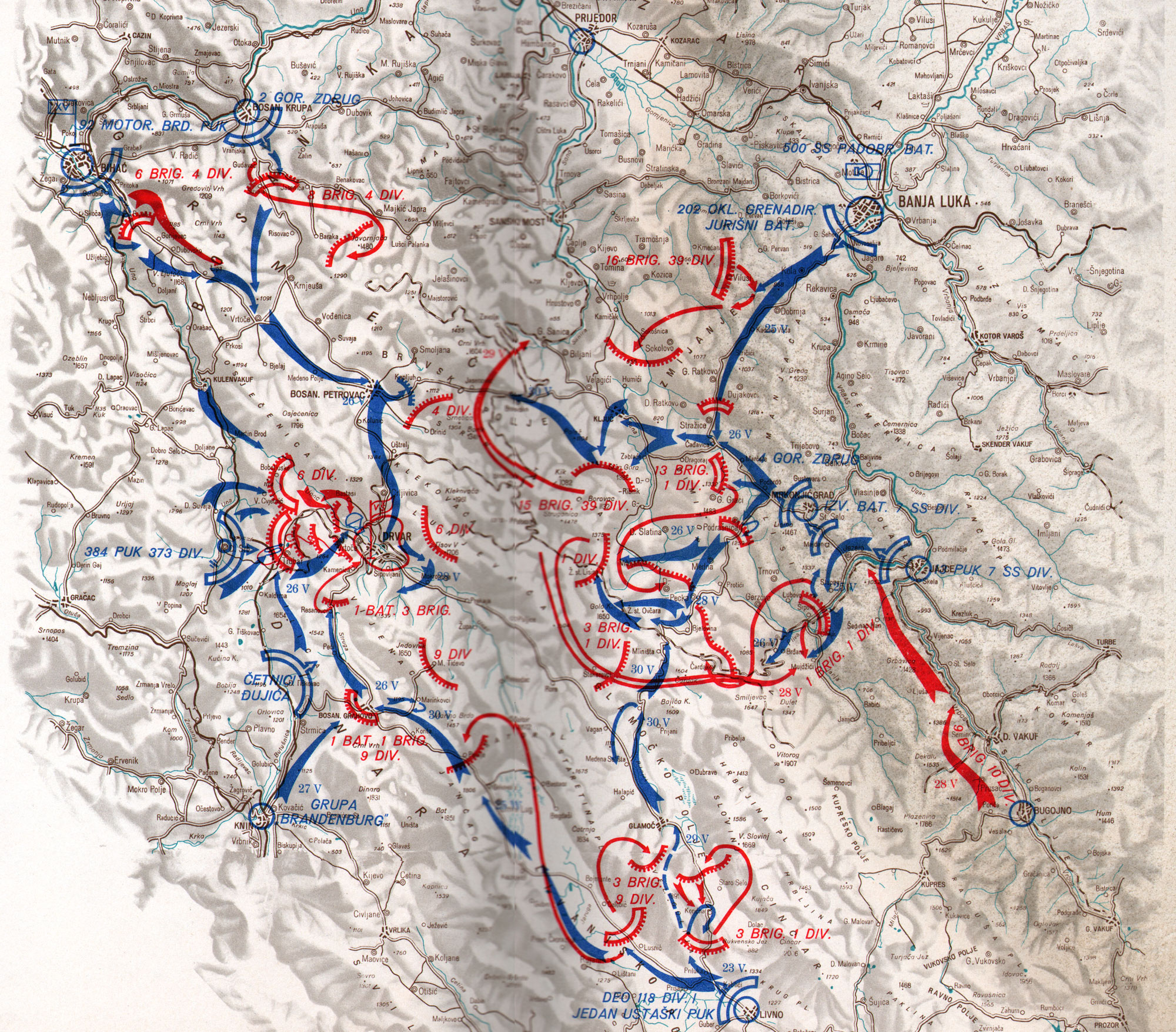
The deployment of Partisan forces around Drvar is shown in red, with German movements shown in blue

Apart from Partisan headquarters and related organisations in and around Drvar, there were between 12,000 and 16,000 Partisans in the area of operations that would be subject to the ground assault by XV Mountain Corps. Near Drvar were elements of the 1st Proletarian Corps commanded by Koča Popović; this corps consisted of the elite 1st Proletarian and 6th Lika Proletarian divisions, the corps headquarters being located in the village of Mokronoge, 6 km (3.7 mi) east of Drvar. Its subordinate formations were further away, the 6th Lika Proletarian Division west of Drvar, and the 1st Proletarian Division deployed in the area around Jajce and Mrkonjić Grad, some 50 km (31 mi) east of Drvar. The nearest large Partisan formation to Drvar was the 3rd Lika Proletarian Brigade of the 6th Lika Proletarian Division based in the Resanovci and Trubar villages some 10 km (6 mi) south and southwest of Drvar.

In the wider area of operations were the Partisan 5th Corps commanded by Slavko Rodić and the 8th Corps commanded by Vlado Ćetković. The 5th Corps was deployed to the northeast and northwest of Drvar with its headquarters south of the Mrkonjić Grad–Ključ road, and the 8th Corps was positioned to the southeast with its headquarters in the mountains between the Glamoč and Livno valleys. Importantly for the coming battle, the 4th Krajina Division of the 5th Corps was deployed between Bihać and Bosanski Petrovac. Two brigades of the 4th Krajina Division and one brigade from the 39th Krajina Division formed a defensive arc north of Drvar, running from Bihać through Krupa to Sanski Most. The 9th Dalmatian Division of the 8th Corps was deployed to the south between Livno and Bosansko Grahovo.

=== German intelligence ===
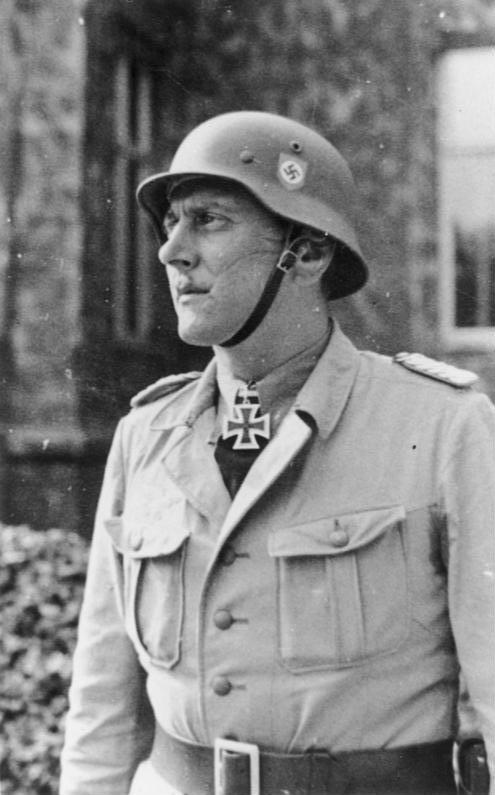
SS-Sturmbannführer Otto Skorzeny apparently did not pass on crucial information about the location of Tito's cave in Drvar

Three German intelligence organisations attempted to determine the location of Tito's headquarters and the disposition of Partisan forces in Drvar. The first of these was the Benesch Special Unit of Section II of the Abwehr (the Wehrmacht intelligence service), some members of which had been involved in identifying Tito's presence in the town of Jajce prior to the German offensive to retake the town. The Benesch Special Unit was part of the Brandenburg Division, and was staffed by ethnic Germans who spoke local languages. The unit had many contacts with both the Chetniks and the Ustaše Militia, and had been tracking Tito since October 1943. Leutnant (Note: Equivalent to a United States Army second lieutenant.) Kirchner of that unit had been responsible for locating Tito before the re-capture of Jajce, and he established a patrol base near Bosansko Grahovo. He got very close to the Drvar cave, and located the Allied military missions, but despite German radio intercepts confirming that Drvar was the site of Tito's headquarters, Kirchner was unable to pinpoint the cave as the location of the headquarters. Kirchner was attached to the 500th SS Parachute Battalion for the operation.

The second intelligence organisation was FAT (Front Reconnaissance Troop) 216 of Section I of the Abwehr. FAT216, commanded by Leutnant Zavadil, was also attached to the 500th SS Parachute Battalion, but did not contribute much to the intelligence used to plan the raid.

On Adolf Hitler's orders, SS-Sturmbannführer (Note: Equivalent to a United States Army major.) Otto Skorzeny of the Sicherheitsdienst (SD, the intelligence branch of the SS), who had commanded the operation to rescue Mussolini in September 1943, was independently involved in intelligence gathering in the lead-up to the raid. Skorzeny acted on behalf of the SD, and after obtaining information from a Partisan deserter that pinpointed Tito's headquarters at the cave, he proposed a plan to infiltrate Drvar with a small group of soldiers to assassinate Tito. Skorzeny soon discovered that the plan to eliminate Tito had been compromised, and had nothing further to do with the operation. It appears that he did not pass on the useful intelligence he had gathered to SS-Hauptsturmführer (Note: Equivalent to a United States Army captain.) Kurt Rybka, the commander of the 500th SS Parachute Battalion, who was responsible for planning the critical airborne aspects of the operation. Largely due to interservice rivalry and competition, the three organisations did not share the intelligence they gathered, which had a significant effect on the tactical planning and execution of the operation. The Germans found forged documents that stated 25 May was Tito's birthday and therefore planned the attack for that day.

=== Partisan intelligence ===
United Newsreel footage of Tito and his headquarters in Drvar

The Partisans had an effective intelligence network. They had been aware of the presence of the 500th SS Parachute Battalion in Yugoslavia for some time, and of the general threat of an airborne assault for over six months. They may have become aware of the isolation of the 500th SS Parachute Battalion or the concentration of transport aircraft and gliders at Zagreb and Banja Luka over a month before the operation. The Partisans also managed to capture the deserter that Skorzeny had interrogated. As a result of these early indicators of an attack, Tito's main headquarters was relocated to another cave near the village of Bastasi, 7 km (4.3 mi) west of Drvar. Tito then used the Drvar cave during the day, but returned to the Bastasi cave at night. As a further precaution, elements of the 6th Lika Proletarian Division were moved closer to Drvar.

On 23 May 1944, a single German Fieseler Fi 156 reconnaissance aircraft flew several parallel runs up and down the Una valley over Drvar at around 600 m (2,000 ft); activity consistent with conducting aerial photography. The aircraft paid particular attention to the villages of Prinavor and Trninić Brijeg where the British military mission and American military personnel were located. This was observed by Street, the acting commander of the British military mission, who assumed it was spotting for a bombing raid and advised both Tito and the Americans. Both Allied missions moved their locations as a result.

Despite the intelligence received and observations made by the British, the Partisans appear to have been quite complacent about the threat; Tito's chief of staff, Arso Jovanović, swore that "a German attack was impossible". The most obvious indicator that Tito was unaware of the imminent attack is that he remained at the Drvar cave overnight on the evening of 24 May, following a celebration, instead of returning to Bastasi.

Through Ultra intercepts of German signal traffic, the British had become aware that the Germans were planning an operation codenamed "Rösselsprung". However, the information available did not include where the operation would occur or what its objectives might be.

== Planning ==
Following intelligence collection, higher level planning for the operation began on 6 May 1944, after von Weichs had issued his initial orders. Hitler gave his approval to von Weichs' final plans on 21 May. The order to XV Mountain Corps was issued by Generaloberst (Note: Equivalent to a United States Army general.) Lothar Rendulic, the commander of 2nd Panzer Army, on the same day, leaving only three days for preparation. General der Infanterie (Note: Equivalent to a United States Army lieutenant general.) Ernst von Leyser, commander of XV Mountain Corps headquartered at Knin, was responsible for the conduct of the operation. The ground forces of von Leyser's XV Mountain Corps were significantly reinforced from Army Group F, the 2nd Panzer Army and V SS Mountain Corps reserves. These reinforcements included two panzer companies, the reconnaissance battalions of the 1st Mountain Division (the 54th Mountain Reconnaissance Battalion) and the 369th (Croatian) Infantry Division, and most of the 7th SS Volunteer Mountain Division Prinz Eugen. The total number of German troops allocated to the operation was about 16,000 men.

In outline, the XV Mountain Corps plan was for a heavy aerial bombardment of Partisan positions in and around Drvar by Luftwaffe aircraft, followed by a parachute and glider assault by the 500th SS Parachute Battalion who had the task of capturing or killing Tito and destroying his headquarters. The assault also included tasks to capture or destroy the Allied military missions to the Partisans. On the same day, ground elements of XV Mountain Corps were to converge on Drvar to link up with the 500th SS Parachute Battalion. A small reconnaissance aircraft was tasked to fly into Drvar after its capture to retrieve Tito or his body.

=== 500th SS Parachute Battalion ===
Rybka received an outline of the operation on 20 May, and more details the following day. He realised that the gliders and transport aircraft would be insufficient for the whole of the 500th SS Parachute Battalion to be delivered to Drvar in one lift, so he came up with a plan involving two waves. The first wave of 654 troops would conduct the assault at 07:00 and a second wave of 220 troops would follow about five hours later. Critically, the intelligence he was given regarding the suspected location of Tito's headquarters (codenamed "Citadel") was that it was in or near a cemetery on high ground southwest of the centre of Drvar, nearly 2 km (1.2 mi) from Tito's actual headquarters cave. This would have far-reaching effects on the planning and execution of the assault.

Rybka's plan for the first wave called for the insertion of 314 parachute troops in three groups (Red, Green and Blue) to secure the town, and another 354 troops in six glider-borne assault groups to carry out specific tasks. The glider-borne group tasks were:

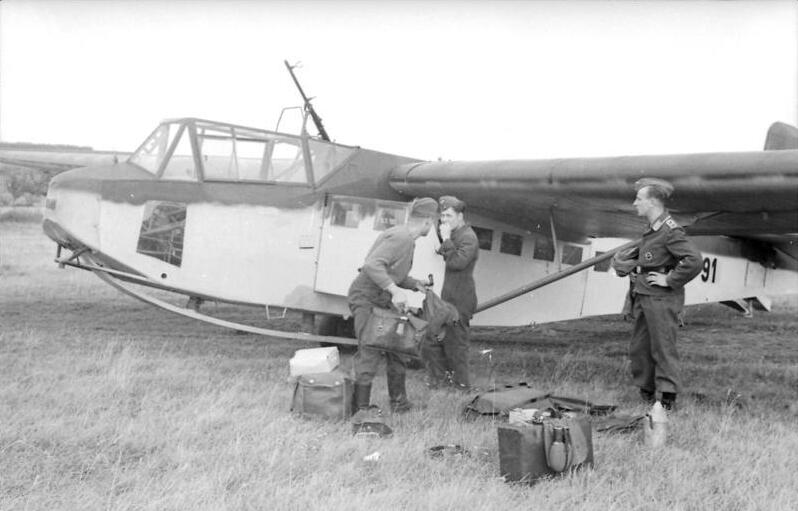
Luftwaffe DFS230 glider as used for troop insertion during Operation Rösselsprung

- Panther Group (110 soldiers) – capture "Citadel" and destroy Tito's headquarters – to land at the cemetery
- Greifer (Grabber) Group (40 soldiers) – destroy the British military mission in the village of Prnjavor 2 km south of Drvar on the road to Bosansko Grahovo
- Stürmer (Stormer) Group (50 soldiers) – destroy the Soviet military mission between the centre of Drvar and the Unac river
- Brecher (Breaker) Group (50 soldiers) – destroy the American military mission in the village of Trninić Brijeg 2 km south of the centre of Drvar
- Draufgänger (Daredevil) Group (70 soldiers including members of the Brandenburg Division, the Abwehr officer Lieutenant Zavadil and some collaborationist Chetniks) – capture the crossroads (codenamed "Western Cross") immediately to the west of Drvar including a nearby suspected communications facility
- Beißer (Biter) Group (20 soldiers) – seize an outpost radio station to the south of Prnjavor then assist the Greifer Group

The second wave of 220 troops based on the training company of the 500th SS Parachute Battalion was to insert by parachute at midday.

Rybka does not appear to have planned for any significant contingencies such as errors in the intelligence on the location of Tito's headquarters. His only known contingency plan was that he would fire a red signal flare to order all available forces to converge on his position for subsequent tasks.

On 22 May 1944, the 500th SS Parachute Battalion was transported to airfields at Nagy-Betskerek (Zrenjanin), Zagreb and Banja Luka, dressed in Wehrmacht uniforms for security reasons. The troops were not briefed on the operation until a few hours before it was launched. They then linked up with their transport aircraft, including the ten-man Luftwaffe DFS230 gliders that would deliver the glider-borne troops onto their objectives. By 24 May, all preparations for the airborne assault were complete.

=== Ground forces ===
The plan for the ground forces of von Leyser's XV Mountain Corps was for nine separate but coordinated thrusts toward the Drvar–Bosanski Petrovac area from all directions. The groupings and tasks were:

- The 384th Infantry Regiment of the 373rd (Croatian) Infantry Division (Croatian legionnaires), with elements of the 2nd Company of the 202nd Panzer Battalion, referred to as Kampfgruppe Willam after its commander, Oberst (Note: Equivalent to a United States Army colonel.) Willam, was to advance east at 05:00 from the village of Srb toward Drvar. Kampfgruppe Willam had the primary responsibility for relieving then taking command of the 500th SS Parachute Battalion in Drvar on 25 May, and was then to attack in the direction of Bosanski Petrovac.
- A battalion group of the 373rd (Croatian) Infantry Division was to set out at 05:00 from Lapac and drive east through Kulen Vakuf to capture the crossroads at Vrtoče. If necessary, they were then to advance northwest toward Bihać to open the road.
- The 92nd Motorised Regiment, with the 54th Reconnaissance Battalion (from the 1st Mountain Division), the 55th Pioneer Battalion (from the 1st Cossack Division), the 468th Armoured Car Company, and a regimental group of the 2nd Croatian Light Infantry Brigade was to advance southeast from Bihać and Bosanska Krupa at 05:00 through Vrtoče to capture Bosanski Petrovac as quickly as possible, destroy the Partisans in that location, and occupy the Partisan airfield and supply installations. After capturing Bosanski Petrovac, elements were to be sent toward Drvar to prevent the withdrawal of Partisans along that road and to link up with the 500th SS Parachute Battalion in Drvar.
- A regimental group of the 7th SS Division was to advance west from the area of Mrkonjić Grad, break through Partisan resistance east of the Sana and then advance on a wide front to block escape routes east out of Drvar. Part of this group was to advance from Jajce along the rail line and roads through Savici to reach their objective, the area around Mliniste power station.
- An ad hoc Kampfgruppe Panzergrenadier Sturmbattalion consisting of officer cadets, with 1st Company of the 202nd Panzer Battalion, under the command of the 7th SS Division, was to advance from Banja Luka toward Ključ to seize the crossing point across the Sana utilised by the Partisans.
- The 105th SS Reconnaissance Battalion with an additional panzer company was to advance from Livno and occupy any Partisan supply installations in the Livno Valley, and prevent any Partisan withdrawal to the south of Drvar by attacking through Bosansko Grahovo toward Drvar.
- The 369th Reconnaissance Battalion of the 369th (Croatian) Infantry Division (Croatian legionnaires), under the command of the 105th SS Reconnaissance Battalion, was to advance from Livno up the Glamoč Valley against Partisan forces withdrawing from Drvar to the southeast.
- The 1st Regiment of the Brandenburg Division, along with the collaborationist Chetnik Dinara Division of Momčilo Đujić, were to advance from Knin toward Bosansko Grahovo and conduct special operations against Partisans in the Prekaja-Drvar area.

== Operation ==
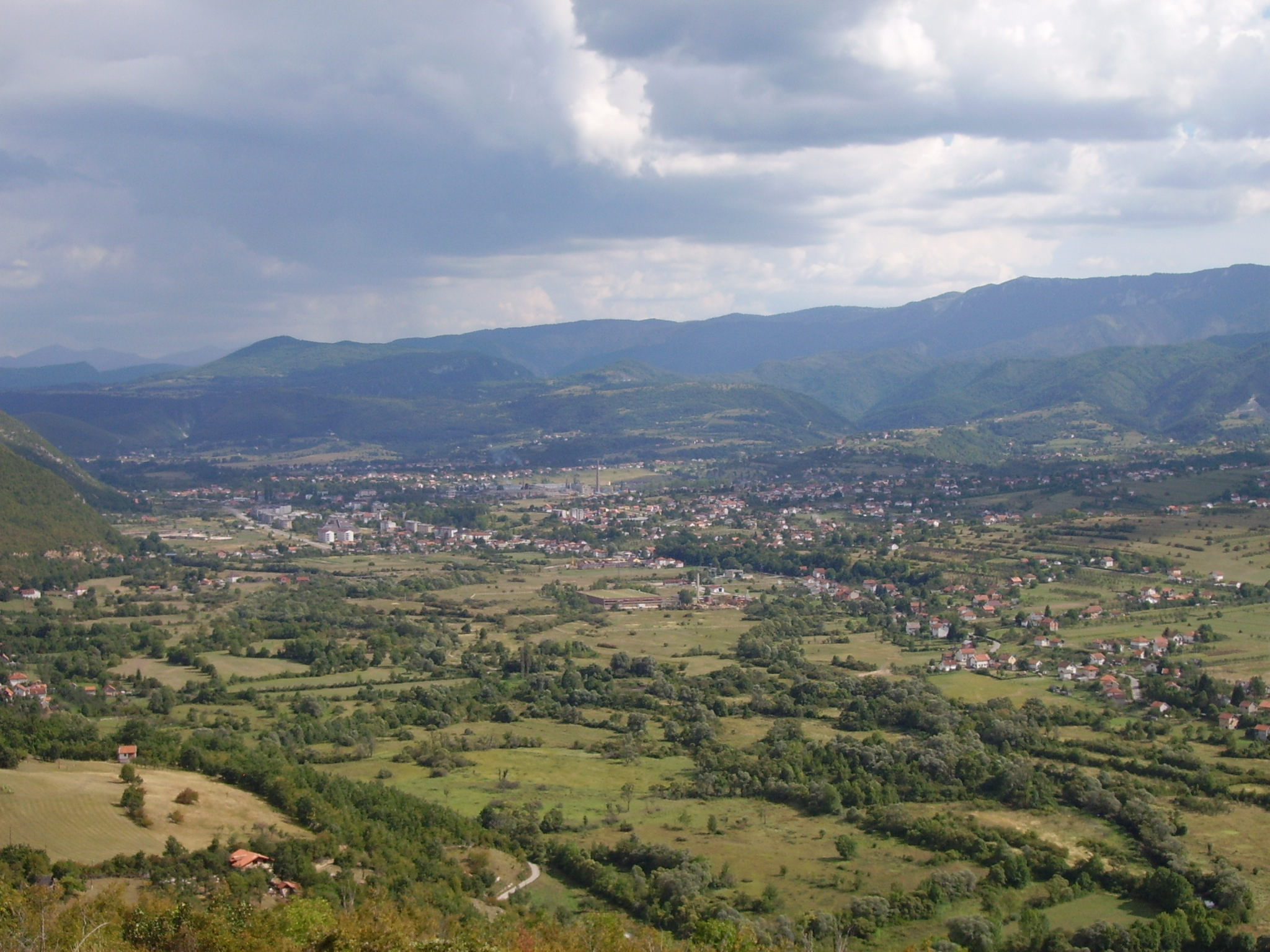
View of Drvar in 2007

The offensive began at 05:00 on 25 May 1944 with the advance of ground forces from their assembly areas surrounding their assigned operational areas. About 06:35, five squadrons of Luftwaffe bombers, including Junkers Ju 87 Stuka dive bombers, began bombing targets within Drvar and Bosanski Petrovac. A total of 440 sorties were flown on that day.

=== Airborne assault and initial response ===
The 500th SS Parachute Battalion began to parachute and glide onto their objectives at 07:00, most parachutists and glider pilots being able to land relatively close to their targets despite the smoke and dust from the bombing. Some gliders landed significantly off course, including one that landed in front of the Bastasi cave 7 km to the west of Drvar, and several that landed in a locality named Vrtoče near Drvar (not to be confused with Vrtoče between Bihać and Petrovac, which was on the axis of advance of the 92nd Motorised Regiment). The occupants of the glider that landed in Bastasi were immediately killed by members of the Tito Escort Battalion guarding the cave, and the occupants of the gliders at Vrtoče had to fight their way toward Drvar. After landing, the first wave of the 500th SS Parachute Battalion quickly gained control of Drvar.

Panther Group supported by Red Group overcame minimal resistance at the cemetery and Rybka established his headquarters behind the cemetery walls, but there was no sign of Tito or his headquarters. Greifer Group and Brecher Group were also unsuccessful as the British and American groups had moved following the aerial reconnaissance on 23 May. Parts of Stürmer Group landed their gliders in a field immediately south of the Drvar cave and came under fire from members of the Tito Escort Battalion on the high ground in the area of the cave. The Draufgänger Group landed their gliders at the "Western Cross", then assaulted a building they believed was the Partisan communications centre. The building was actually the office of the Communist Party of Yugoslavia Central Committee, who resisted fanatically until the building was levelled using satchel charges. Both Blue Group and Green Group, consisting of parachute troops that landed in the eastern part of Drvar where most of the population lived, were also engaged in heavy fighting. The SKOJ had just finished a conference in Drvar, and many of the delegates were still staying in the town. Many youths took up whatever arms they could obtain and commenced fighting the parachutists who were attempting to establish a cordon on the eastern side of the town.

About 2 km further east on the road to Mokronoge was a Partisan officer training school with about 130 students. On hearing the fighting from the direction of Drvar, the students marched west initially armed with only pistols and a few rifles. They split into two groups, a smaller group that crossed the Unac and advanced west along the railway line on the ridge leading toward Tito's cave, and a larger group that collected arms and ammunition from several stray canisters of German equipment dropped by parachute. The larger group of students attacked Green and Blue Groups from the east around 08:00, suffering severe casualties, but maintained continuous pressure on the German flank. About 09:00, the Germans had largely secured Drvar, and the available troops went from house to house, armed with photographs of Tito, brutally questioning the civilians they could find. Soon after this commenced, Rybka realised that Partisan resistance was concentrated to the north in the vicinity of the cave. He, therefore, fired the red signal flare to rally his troops for an assault in that direction.

=== Assault on Tito's cave and the Partisan counterattack ===
Tito's cave headquarters in 1990

At about 10:30, Rybka launched a frontal attack across the Unac supported by at least one MG42 machine gun firing into the mouth of the cave. The Germans reached the base of the hill, fifty metres from the cave, but suffered severe casualties in the assault. They were also running low on water. Before this attack, Tito and around 20 staff had taken refuge in the cave.

While Rybka was assembling his troops for this attack, surrounding Partisan forces were rushed toward Drvar. Three battalions of the 3rd Lika Proletarian Brigade of the 6th Lika Proletarian Division approached from the southeast. One battalion attacked the German position at the cemetery while the other two swung around to strike the Germans from the west.

About 11:15, after Rybka's first attack had been defeated, Tito and the small group gathered with him escaped from the cave. There was a platform at the mouth of the cave, and they climbed down a rope through a trapdoor in the platform, although the panic displayed by Tito's mistress Davorjanka Paunović (codenamed "Zdenka") and his dog Tigar caused some delays. The party split up and following a creek leading away from the Unac, the small groups climbed the heights to the east and withdrew toward the village of Potoci.

=== Second German attack and withdrawal ===
The second wave of parachute troops was dropped in two groups to the west of the cemetery at about midday. The drop zone was within fields of fire of the Partisans to the west of Drvar, and the paratroops suffered many casualties during the drop. Collecting the remainder, Rybka mounted a second attack, but the pressure on his flanks was too heavy, and the assault again failed. Fighting continued throughout the afternoon with both sides taking heavy casualties.

In the late afternoon, Rybka ordered his forces to withdraw to the area of the cemetery where he formed a defensive perimeter. During the withdrawal, at least one group of troops was cut off and killed. About 18:00, Rybka was wounded by a grenade blast and was later evacuated with other casualties in the light aircraft intended to carry away Tito after his capture. Roughly at the same time, his Partisan counterpart in Drvar, Milan Šijan, the commander of the 3rd Lika Proletarian Brigade, was also wounded by German machine gun fire. By 21:30, the Germans had consolidated their position in the cemetery, although they were completely surrounded by the Partisans. During the night, the 3rd Lika Proletarian Brigade attacked the cemetery, with the 1st Battalion of the 3rd Brigade of the 9th Dalmatian Division reinforcing the assault. At 03:30 on 26 May, the final Partisan attack was launched against the cemetery, breaching the walls in several places, but the paratroopers held on.

=== Ground force assault and Partisan withdrawal ===
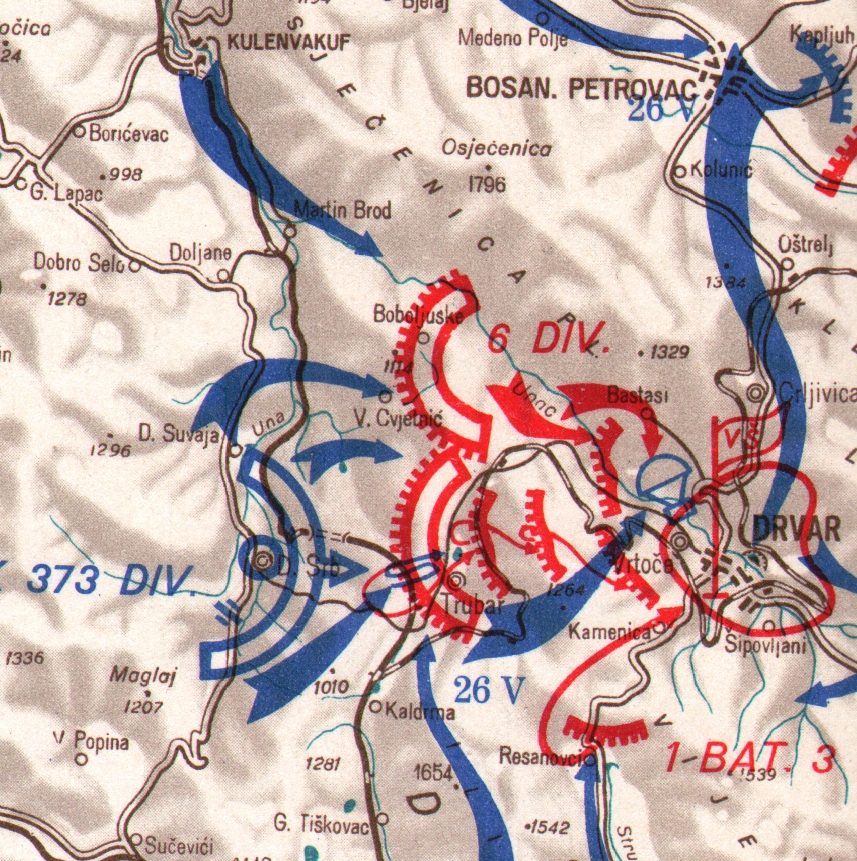
The assault by Kampfgruppe Willam on 25 May 1944

Although its total strength was estimated at 185,500 men in late May 1944, the 2nd Panzer Army was not able to rally more than 16,000 troops for Operation Rösselsprung due to ever-increasing Partisan activity throughout the country. The Germans had to rely on special forces and improved tactics. The Partisans defended the territory they controlled with significant demolition and mining of roads. Roadblocks were manned by patrols and smaller detachments, whose task was to hold off the enemy until reinforcements arrived. During Operation Rösselsprung, the Germans rendered these tactics ineffective by combining strong and fast motorised columns with adequate pioneer support. This combination was especially successful for the column led by the 92nd Motorised Regiment. The second German tactical innovation was the employment of five reconnaissance battalions for independent operations deep inside Partisan-controlled territory.

==== 25 May ====
Throughout 25 May, the ground forces of XV Mountain Corps were not able to advance as quickly as planned. There was unexpected resistance from the Partisan 1st Proletarian, 5th and 8th Corps along their axes of advance, and there was very poor communication and coordination between the columns. The ground forces were also subjected to Allied air attacks by Air Vice-Marshal William Elliot's Balkan Air Force throughout the day, called in by the British mission using their surviving radio.

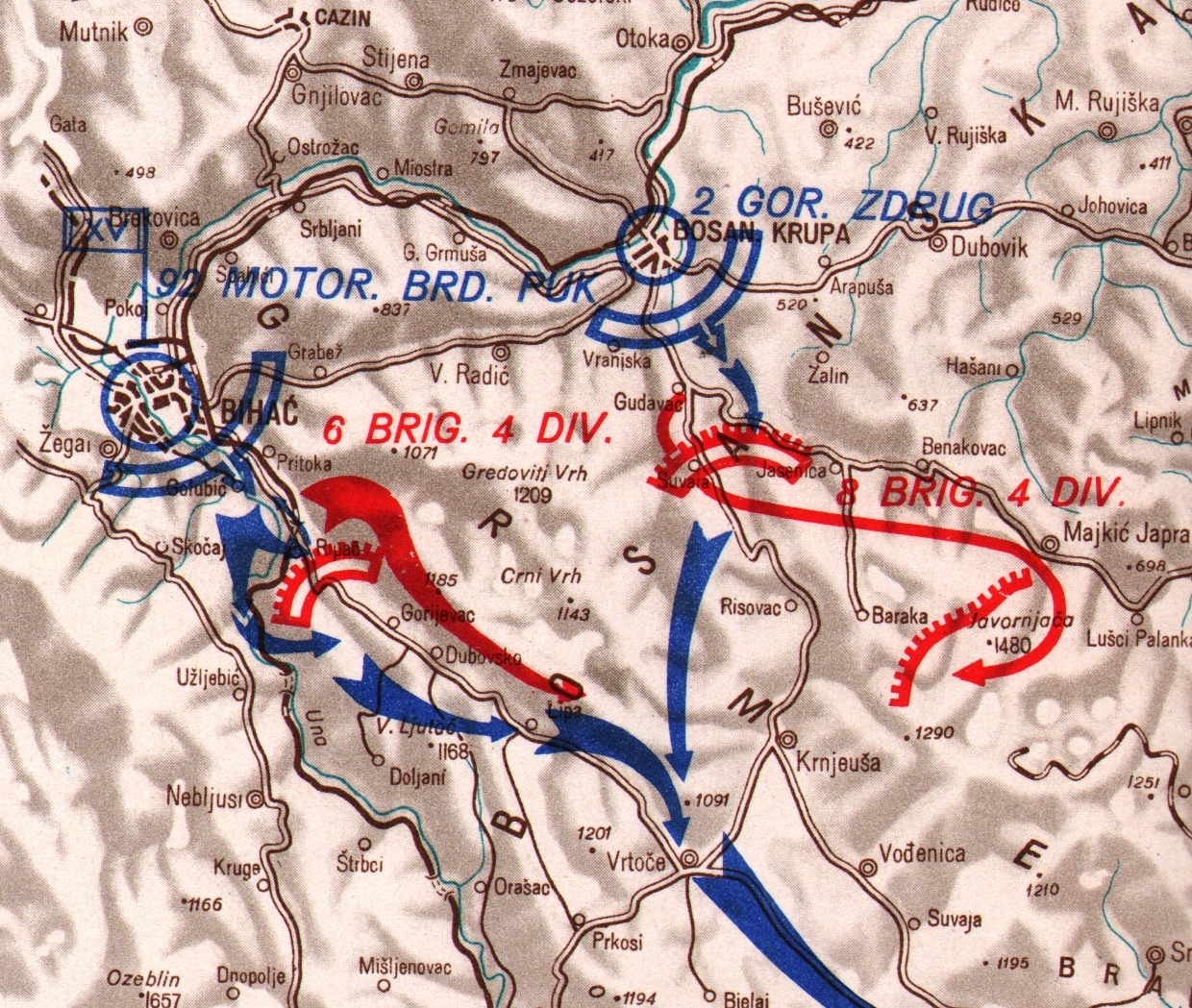
The assault by the 92nd Motorised Regiment Kampfgruppe on 25 May 1944

At 05:00 on 25 May, Kampfgruppe Willam commenced its attack from Srb in an easterly direction, aiming to cover the 20 km (12 mi) to Drvar as quickly as possible. It encountered organised resistance from the 2nd Lika Proletarian Brigade of the 6th Lika Proletarian Division. After a day's fighting, the Germans had captured Trubar, but were unable to overcome the defences of the hills east of the village. Recognising the importance of Kampfgruppe Willam's task, the commander of the 373th Division, Generalleutnant (Note: Equivalent to a United States Army major general.) Eduard Aldrian, ordered the battalion group of the 373th Division to abandon its advance from Lapac to Martin Brod and reinforce Kampfgruppe Willam instead. The remaining brigade of the 6th Lika Proletarian Division, the 1st Lika Proletarian Shock Brigade, was deployed to the north along the Una river. The 2nd Lika Proletarian Brigade requested assistance from the 1st Lika Proletarian Shock Brigade, but divisional headquarters ordered it to send reinforcements to Drvar instead. At 21:00, the 3rd Battalion of the 2nd Lika Proletarian Brigade launched a successful local counterattack on the vanguard of Kampfgruppe Willam, separating it from the main body. Willam then decided to halt the advance and place the remaining units into all-round defence. At 22:25, Aldrian ordered him to resume the attack, but Willam reported that this was impossible due to loss of contact with his own units.

The 92nd Motorised Regiment Kampfgruppe consisted of two columns, a western column based on the 92nd Motorised Regiment, and an eastern column consisting of the 54th Reconnaissance Battalion and 1st Home Guard Jäger Regiment of the 2nd Croatian Light Infantry Brigade. The western column advanced southeast from Bihać, and encountered resistance from the 6th Krajina Brigade of the 4th Krajina Division. By the end of the day, the western column had reached Vrtoče, halfway between Bihać and Bosanski Petrovac. Being fully motorised, it used its mobility to outmanoeuvre the Partisans, bypassing their main defensive positions to the west, the Cossack pioneers playing an important role in keeping the column moving. The eastern column started its advance from Bosanska Krupa, aiming to establish contact with the western column at Vrtoče. It advanced 10 km before being held up by the defences of the 8th Krajina Brigade of the 4th Krajina Division.

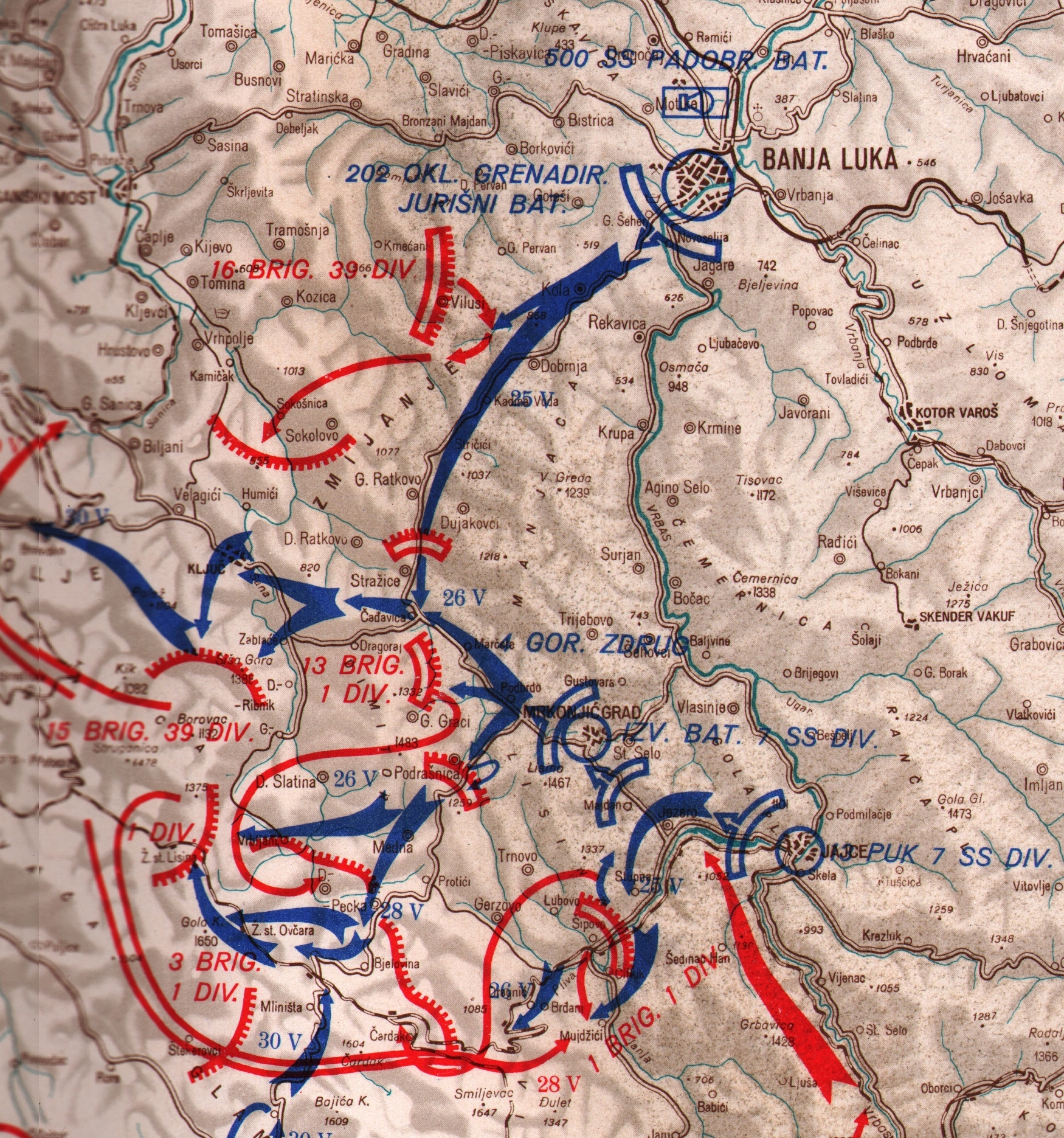
The assault by elements of the 7th SS Division on 25 May 1944

The forces commanded by the 7th SS Division were organised into northern, central and southern columns. The northern column consisted of Kampfgruppe Panzergrenadier Sturmbattalion and included a company of tanks. It moved swiftly southwest from its start point near Banja Luka, and had reached Čađavica (at a crossroads halfway between Mrkonjić Grad and Ključ) by the evening of 25 May, brushing off the 16th Krajina Brigade of the 39th Krajina Division deployed on the right flank of its axis of advance. The rapid advance meant that the 13th Krajina Brigade of the 39th Krajina Division was unable to organise an effective defence. The 39th Krajina Division then ordered the 13th Krajina Brigade to block the road from Čađavica to Ključ to prevent the loss of Ključ, but only one battalion of the brigade managed to reach that position by dawn on 26 May.

The central column consisted of the 7th SS Reconnaissance Battalion reinforced with one battery of self-propelled guns, which had a special task: it was to strike from Mrkonjić Grad, penetrate deeply into the Partisans' rear and destroy the HQ of the 5th Partisan Corps in Ribnik. Despite having only two battalions in the area (the third was facing Kampfgruppe Panzergrenadier Sturmbattalion at Čađavica), the 13th Proletarian Brigade managed to hold off this thrust. The southern column was based on the 13th SS Mountain Regiment, reinforced by I Battalion of the 7th SS Mountain Artillery Regiment and some Chetniks. This column launched its assault from the Jajce area, and had the task of reaching Mliništa (20 km south of Ključ). By 17:20, II Battalion of the 13th SS Mountain Regiment had taken Šipovo, but any further advance was halted by the defences of the 1st Proletarian Brigade.

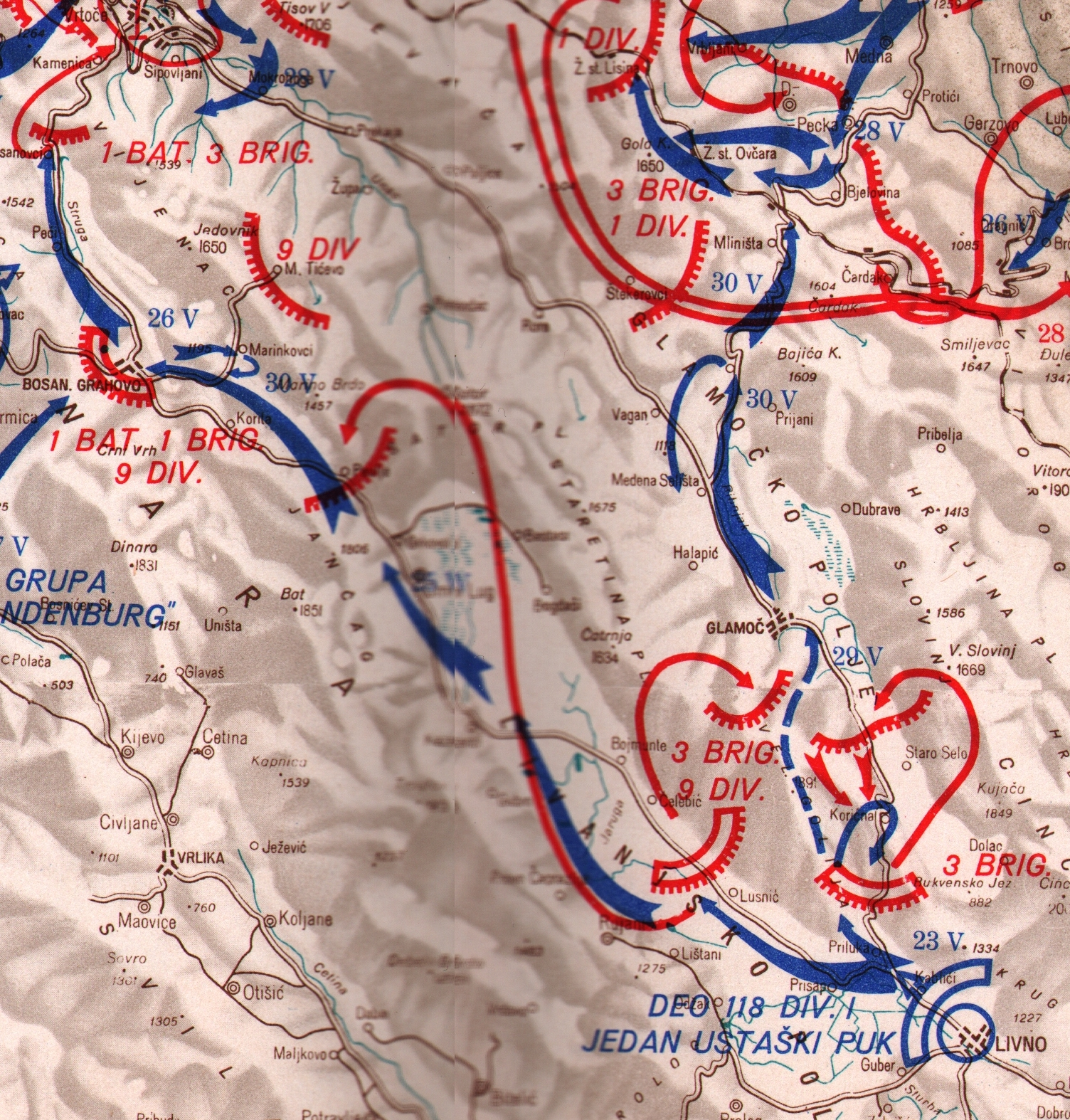
The assault by the 369th and 105th SS Reconnaissance Battalions from Livno on 25 May 1944

The Germans deployed two columns to attack north from Livno. The 369th Reconnaissance Battalion with some 200 men from the 6th Ustaša Brigade advanced towards Glamoč, and the 105th SS Reconnaissance Battalion with a panzer company thrust in the direction of Bosansko Grahovo. By 16:00 on 25 May 1944, the 369th Reconnaissance Battalion column had reached the village of Han-Vrbe, some 5 km from Bosansko Grahovo. At that point, it was attacked by the 2nd Battalion of the 3rd Krajina Brigade and was forced to retreat. During the retreat, this column was attacked by two more battalions of the 3rd Krajina Brigade and was pushed back to its start line at Livno with heavy losses. A preliminary German report estimated their losses at 50, but the 3rd Krajina Brigade estimated German losses at 191 dead and wounded. The 105th SS Reconnaissance Battalion column overcame the resistance of local Partisan units and the 1st and 4th Battalions of the 13th Dalmatian Brigade, and by the end of the day had reached Crni Lug, some 20 km from Bosansko Grahovo. In the evening, the 13th Dalmatian Brigade was ordered to march towards Tičevo and Drvar to reinforce the Partisan forces in that area.

The 1st Regiment of the Brandenburg Division, reinforced by a pioneer company from the 373rd (Croatian) Infantry Division and the Chetnik Dinara Division, attacked along the Knin–Bosansko Grahovo axis, pushed back the local Grahovo–Peulje Partisan Detachment and by the end of the day had reached positions some 5 km beyond Strmica.

Escorted by elements of the 3rd Krajina Brigade, Tito made his way to Potoci, where he was met by a battalion of the 1st Proletarian Brigade. At Potoci, they were met by the staff of the Allied military missions. The British mission signals officer had brought the only surviving radio. Initially, Tito had been in favour of continuing the attack on the SS paratroopers, but after reassessing the situation, he cancelled further attacks. As the German intention to encircle the Supreme Command in a small area around Drvar with approaching units, and then destroy it with land forces had become apparent by now, serious reorganisation of Partisan dispositions was required. After German troops were observed in the area of Potoci, Tito and his companions were escorted towards Kupres.

The 2nd Panzer Army was monitoring the operation closely. The report of a special troop, which had been sent into the Partisans' rear with the help of disguised Chetniks several days earlier, drew particular attention from Rendulic. According to this report, received late on 25 May, Tito was in the area of Potoci, halfway between Drvar and Ribnik. Rendulic ordered the commander of the 7th SS Division to immediately form a special company-strong detachment, with a mission to infiltrate behind the Partisan lines to kill Tito and destroy the Partisan Supreme Command. The detachment was formed on the night of 25/26 May from the 11th Company of the 13th SS Regiment, several pioneers, and a group of specially trained personnel from the Brandenburg Division. As the detachment failed to penetrate into the Partisan territory that night, it tried again the following night.

==== 26–27 May ====
About 05:00 on 26 May, a Luftwaffe fighter-bomber formation engaged the Partisan troops withdrawing from Drvar. The western column of the 92nd Motorised Regiment Kampfgruppe was ordered to help assist the eastern column by detaching a reinforced panzer company from Vrtoče.

On the morning of 26 May, the German columns advancing from Bihać towards Ključ, and from Livno and Knin towards Bosansko Grahovo, overcame the Partisan units in their paths, and continued their advance facing little resistance. The 92nd Motorised Grenadier Regiment, advancing from Vrtoče, took Bosanski Petrovac without a fight about 08:00. It continued its march to Drvar and relieved the 500th SS Parachute Battalion at 12:45. Kampfgruppe Willam established radio contact with the 500th SS Battalion around 07:00, and at 17:00 entered Drvar via Kamenica. The 105th SS Reconnaissance Battalion arrived at Bosansko Grahovo at 10:30, where it was joined by the 1st Regiment of the Brandenburg Division at 16:00. Kampfgruppe Panzergrenadier Sturmbattalion entered Ključ at 14:15.

In the eastern sector, the Partisan line of defence was still holding. During 26 and 27 May, the 7th SS Division continued exerting strong pressure on the 1st Proletarian Division in the upper Sana River Valley, but failed to achieve a decisive breakthrough. By the end of 27 May, the front line had stabilised to the north and south of Ribnik. After the defeat it had suffered the previous day, the 369th Reconnaissance Battalion column did not resume its advance towards Glamoč on the 26th.

On 26 May, due to the rapidly changing situation and communications difficulties, a degree of confusion emerged on both sides. Out of contact with their corps headquarters, the 4th Krajina Division continued to retain two brigades along the Bihać-Bosanski Petrovac road, even though the 92nd Motorised Regiment had already passed along this route and into their rear. The critically important Bosanski Petrovac-Ključ road to the south was left unguarded, endangering Tito and Partisan Supreme Headquarters as they fled from Drvar.

XV Mountain Corps failed to recognise and exploit these flaws in Partisan deployments. After the 500th Parachute Battalion had been relieved, the XV Mountain Corps ordered the units in the Drvar area to disperse. The 92nd Motorised Regiment with all subordinated units was ordered to return north and attack the brigades of the 4th Krajina Division on Mount Grmeč, to secure the main supply road from Bihać to Bosanski Petrovac; this action, codenamed "Grmeč", was scheduled to start on the morning of 27 May. The 373rd Division with the newly subordinated 1st Regiment of the Brandenburg Division was ordered to conduct a sweep-and-destroy operation in the area south and southeast of Drvar; this operation was codenamed "Vijenac", and was to take place concurrently with "Operation Grmeč". The 9th Dalmatian Division managed to repulse all attacks on 27 May, pushing the Brandenburgers and Chetniks back to Bosansko Grahovo. On 27 May, the 369th Reconnaissance Battalion column again tried to advance on Glamoč, but with no success.

Unhappy with the development of the operation to this point, Rendulic cancelled Operations "Grmeč" and "Vijenac" on the afternoon of 27 May, and ordered von Leyser to move all units back to their start positions for a concentric attack on the area where Tito and two Partisan corps headquarters (1st Proletarian and 5th) were believed to be located. The attack was scheduled to begin on the morning of 28 May. Rendulic also sent the 105th SS Reconnaissance Battalion to the Livno-Glamoč area which had been left wide open by the defeat of the 369th Reconnaissance Battalion thrust.

Tito, his staff and his escort continued toward Kupres, travelling on foot and horseback, as well as on the wagons of a narrow-gauge logging railway. During this trek, one of the members of the Soviet mission was wounded by shellfire.

== Aftermath ==
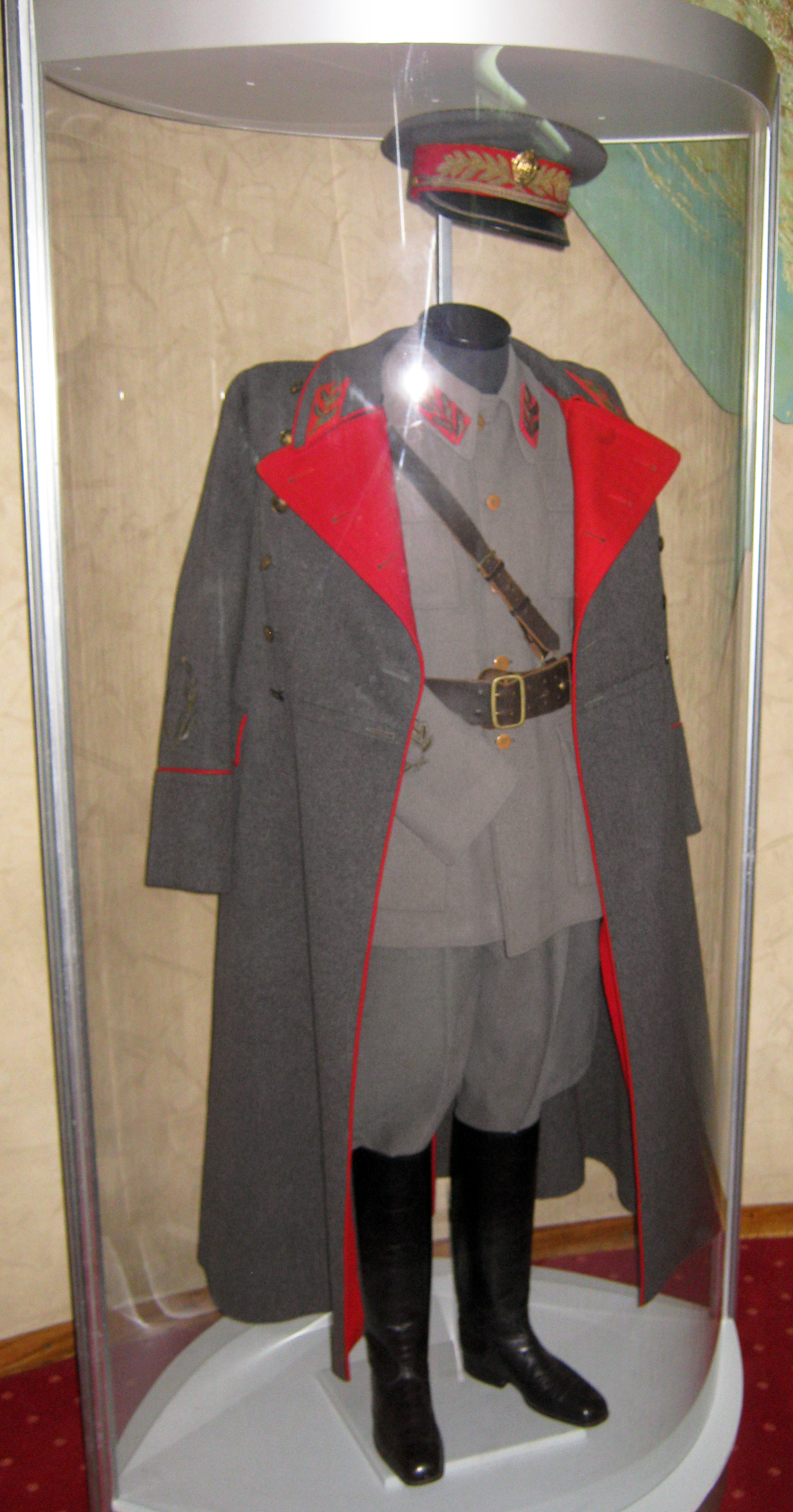
While unable to capture Tito, the Germans did find his marshal's uniform in Drvar, and later placed it on display in Vienna.

Throughout their escape, the British mission were able to maintain contact with their headquarters by radio and continued to call in support from the Balkan Air Force against the German formations taking part in Operation Rösselsprung and the Luftwaffe aircraft in the skies over Yugoslavia. This included over one thousand sorties. A costly ground attack was also launched by a combined Partisan, British and United States force on the German-held Dalmatian island of Brač. Code-named "Operation Flounced", the assault was mounted from the partisan-held island of Vis further out in the Adriatic Sea on the night of 1/2 June. Fighting continued late into 3 June 1944 and resulted in the reinforcement of the island by a further 1,900 German troops. After three days of fighting, the combined forces returned to Vis. The Partisans suffered losses of 67 dead, 308 wounded and 14 missing, and Allied units suffered 60 dead, 74 wounded and 20 missing, with the commanding officer, Lieutenant Colonel Jack Churchill, being captured by the Germans.

After six days evading the Germans, the leader of the Soviet mission, Lieutenant General Nikolai Vasilevich Korneev, who had lost a leg in the Battle of Stalingrad, suggested an air evacuation of Tito and the Soviet mission and this was expanded by Street to include the whole party. After three days deliberation, Tito agreed on 3 June and Street arranged the evacuation the same night from an RAF-operated airfield near the town of Kupres. Seven Douglas C-47 Skytrain aircraft, one with a Soviet crew and the remainder with US crews, carried Tito and his party, the Allied missions and 118 wounded Partisans to Bari in Italy. Late on 6 June, Tito was delivered by the Royal Navy escort destroyer HMS Blackmore to Vis, where he re-established his headquarters and was joined by the Allied missions. The Soviet Foreign Minister, Vyacheslav Molotov, believed that the British had known more about the attack than they claimed, based on the absence of both Maclean and Churchill from Drvar at the time of the attack. On 28 May, he sent a message to Korneev detailing his suspicions.

Although Tito's headquarters, along with several other Partisan organisations, was temporarily disrupted and key staff were lost during the operation, all Partisan organisations were quickly relocated and resumed operations. Drvar reverted to Partisan control within a few weeks of the operation. The operation was a failure, as Tito, his principal headquarters staff and the Allied military personnel escaped, despite their presence in Drvar at the time of the airborne assault. The operation failed due to several factors, including Partisan resistance in the town itself and along the approaches to Drvar. The failure of the German intelligence agencies to share the limited information available on Tito's exact location also contributed to the unsuccessful outcome for the Germans, and this failure to share intelligence was compounded by a lack of contingency planning by the commander of the German airborne force.

The 500th SS Parachute Battalion was crippled during Operation Rösselsprung, suffering 576 killed and 48 wounded. Only 200 soldiers of the battalion were fit to fight on the morning of 26 May. It continued throughout the rest of the war as the only SS parachute unit, although its name was later changed to the 600th SS Parachute Battalion. Operation Rösselsprung was its only combat parachute operation.

According to a German report, the ground troops of XV Mountain Corps suffered 213 killed, 881 wounded, and 51 missing during Operation Rösselsprung. The same report claimed that 6,000 Partisans were killed. The commander of the 7th SS Division, SS-Brigadeführer und Generalmajor der Waffen-SS (Note: Equivalent to a United States Army brigadier general.) Otto Kumm claimed that Partisan losses included 1,916 confirmed and another 1,400 estimated killed, and 161 taken prisoner. Kumm also claimed that six Allied aircraft were shot down during the operation. According to a Partisan source, their total losses were 399 killed, 479 wounded, and at least 85 missing. Of this total, the casualties suffered in fighting with the 500th SS Parachute Battalion at Drvar numbered 179 killed, 63 wounded, and 19 missing. Ultimately, according to intelligence historian Ralph Bennett, "[t]he long-term significance of the Drvar raid was simply that it failed."

Although Tito was born on 7 May, after he became president of the Federal People's Republic of Yugoslavia, he celebrated his birthday on 25 May to mark the unsuccessful attempt on his life.

== In film ==
Operation Rösselsprung was depicted in the 1963 Partisan film Desant na Drvar directed by Fadil Hadžić.
