= Puzigaća =

Puzigaća (Serbian Cyrillic: Пузигаћа) is a Serbian surname, predominantly found in Drvar, Bosnia and Herzegovina, but also in the other former Yugoslav republics of Croatia (16 individuals) and Serbia. According to Petar Rađenović's study on the Unac region from 1933–34, the Puzigaća family, of whom there were five households in Mokronoge and Vidovo Selo, and five households in Šipovljani. The Puzigaća are part of the wider Kukilović family (this surname is no longer used), who mainly inhabit Mokronoge, and include the local related families of Puzigaća, Medarević, Markanović, Lazić, Bašić, Polić, Gajanović, Janković, Mihajlović, all of whom have the Serbian Orthodox feast day (slava) of Jovanjdan (St. John the Baptist). The Kukilović had migrated from the Cetina region in Dalmatia some 5–6 generations prior to the study. The Puzigaća in Šipovljani consist of two core families which moved from Drnić and Vidovo Selo, respectively, some 80 years prior to the study (1850s).

== Notable people ==
- Bojan Puzigaća (born 1985), Bosnian footballer, from Drvar
- Milka Puzigaća, Serbian political analyst, lives in Novi Sad
- Dejan Puzigaća, one of the murderers of Bris Taton
- Dragica Puzigaća (fl. 1942–43), Yugoslav communist
- Milan Puzigaća, Yugoslav Partisan soldier of the Kozara Brigade
