= Bunjevac =

Bunjevac may refer to:

- Bunjevac dialect
- Bunjevci

== See also ==
- Bunčevac
