= Ilija Kajtez =

Serbian writer

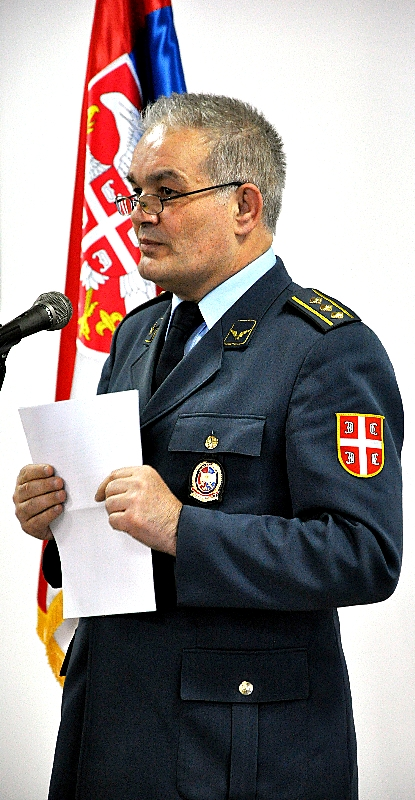
- Prof. Ilija Kajtez, at the presentation of the book "Wisdom and the Sword", Atrium of the Ceremonial Hall of the Home of the Serbian Army, Belgrade, April 4, 2013.
- Born: 16 January 1961; Poljice, Drvar, PR Bosnia and Herzegovina, FPR Yugoslavia
- Occupations: sociologist philosopher university professor writer retired military officer
- Writing career
- Language: Serbian

Ilija Kajtez (January 16, 1961) is a Serbian sociologist, philosopher, university professor, writer, and retired officer. He is the former head of the Department of Social Sciences and a regular professor of sociology at the Military Academy in Belgrade. He retired with the rank of colonel.

He authored an extensive monograph titled "Mudrost i mač: filozofi o tajnama mira I rata" (Wisdom and Sword: Philosophers on the Secrets of Peace and War), which has been translated and published in English, French, German, Spanish, Portuguese, Italian, Polish, and Dutch. He is also the editor of the international electronic library "Philosophy of War and Peace" at Project Rastko International Cultural Network.

== Biography ==
=== Education ===
Kajtez completed elementary school in Šajkaš near Novi Sad. Following basic education, he graduated from the Air Force Gymnasium "Marshal Tito" in Mostar and later the Air Force Military Academy in Zemunik (Zadar). He acquired a bachelor's degree in philosophy and sociology from the Faculty of Philosophy in Zadar, while employed, and earned his master's degree in political sociology from the Faculty of Political Sciences in Belgrade with a thesis titled "Nazism and Ustasha – Genealogy of Evil" in 1997. In 2004 he obtained his doctoral degree with a thesis titled "Radicalism and Victims – The Case of the October Revolution: An Anthropological-Political Analysis".

=== Professional and academic career ===
From 1991. Kajtez has taught philosophy (1991–1998) and sociology (1998–2016). He served as the head of the Foreign Language (2005–2007) and the Department of Social Sciences (2007–2015). He also taught the subject of Doctrines of Non-Violence at the Faculty of Security in Belgrade (2008–2014).

Currently, he is working at the Faculty of International Politics and Security of the university "Union – Nikola Tesla" in Belgrade. He teaches Sociology and Philosophy in undergraduate studies, Doctrines of Non-Violence in master's studies, and Polemology and Irinology in doctoral studies.

In addition to monographs, Kajtez publishes philosophical essays, scientific discussions and stories in journals such as Javnost, Vojska, Pedagoška Stvarnost, Svarog, Odbrana, Pravoslavlje, Hrišćanska Misao, Studenička Akademija, Večernje Novosti, Pravoslavni Katiheta, Koraci, Politika, Srpska Slavodarska Misao, Tema, Nacionalni Interes, Pečat, Napredak, Nikolai's Studies, and others.

He was declared the best collaborator of the journal Vojni Informator of the year 2003, and the best professor at the Military Academy in 2012. He was a part of the Team for Reforms of the Ministry of Defense in 2004. He is the editor of the electronic library "Philosophy of War and Peace" hosted on the site Projekat Rastko. He served two terms as a member of the Senate of the University of Defense in Belgrade. He is also a member of the Association of Writers of Serbia.

== Selected bibliography ==
Monographs

- Smisao i trag (filozofski eseji), "Offset Print", Novi Sad, 2000. (pp. 324.)
- Revolucionarno nasilje — himna slobodi ili apologija zla (monografija), Univerzitet/Fakultet bezbednosti i "Službeni glasnik", Beograd. 2009. (pp. 370.) ISBN 978-86-519-0085-6 .
- Mudrost i mač: filozofi o tajnama mira i rata (monografija), MC "Odbrana", Beograd. 2012. (pp. 748.) ISBN 978-86-335-0365-5 .
- Čovek i tajna (eseji), "Dobrotoljublje", Beograd. 2015.(pp. 328.) ISBN 978-86-6453-000-2 .
- Wisdom and Sword, Volume I – Ancient and Medieval Philosophers on the Secrets of War and Peace, "LAP-Lambert Academic Publishing", Saarbrücken, Germany, 2016, (pp. 393.) ISBN 978-3-659-95488-7 (translated into English by Dragan Stanar)
- Wisdom and Sword, Volume II – Philosophers of the New Age on the Riddles of War and Peace, "LAP-Lambert Academic Publishing", Saarbrücken, Germany, 2017,(pp. 409.) ISBN 978-3-330-08390-5 (translated into English by Dragan Stanar)
- Wisdom and Sword Volume III, Modern Philosophers and Russian Philosophers and Sages on the Mysteries of War and Peace, "LAP-Lambert Academic Publishing", Saarbrücken, Germany, 2018, (pp. 226.) ISBN 978-3-330-02393-2, (translated into English by Dragan Stanar)
- Misao i kosmos — čovek u potrazi za smislom života (filozofski eseji), "Dobrotoljublje", Beograd, 2018. (pp. 501.) ISBN 978-86-6453-006-4.
- Sociologija (udžbenik za kadete Vojne akademije), MC "Odbrana", Beograd. 2019. (pp. 856.) ISBN 978-86-335-0593-2 .
- Smisao i trag — Čovek razapet između tvrde Zemlje i hladnih Zvezda (filozofski eseji), "Dobrotoljublje", Beograd. 2019.(pp. 565.) ISBN 978-86-6453-015-6 .
- Љубан Каран, Илија Кајтез: Јован Милановић: највећи српски обавештајац, „Филип Вишњић”, Београд. 2023.(стр.466.) ISBN 978-86-6309-286-0.
