= Motike =

Motike may refer to:

- Motike (Banja Luka)
- Motike (Drvar)
