= Trninić =

Trninić is a surname. People with the surname include:

- Aleksandar Trninić, a Serbian footballer
- Slobodan Trninić, a Croatian cinematographer

== See also ==
- Trninić Brijeg
