= Župica =

- Village
- Location within Bosnia and Herzegovina
- Coordinates: 44.3029°N 16.5225°E
- Country: Bosnia and Herzegovina
- Entity: Federation of Bosnia and Herzegovina
- Canton: Canton 10
- Municipality: Drvar

Area
  - Total: 5.24 km^{2} (2.02 sq mi)

Population (2013)
  - Total: 25
  - Density: 4.8/km^{2} (12/sq mi)
- Time zone: UTC+1 (CET)
  - Summer (DST): UTC+2 (CEST)

Župica is a village in the Municipality of Drvar in Canton 10 of the Federation of Bosnia and Herzegovina, an entity of Bosnia and Herzegovina.

On 31 July 1943 the first issue of Glas (today Glas Srpske), the oldest newspaper in Bosnia and Herzegovina, was published in the village.

== Demographics ==
According to the 2013 census, its population was 25, all Serbs.

== Bibliography ==
- Ethnicity/National Affiliation, Religion and Mother Tongue (PDF). Sarajevo: Agency for Statistics of Bosnia and Herzegovina. 2019.
