= Bastasi, Drvar =

Bastasi Бастаси
- Village
- Location within Bosnia and Herzegovina
- Coordinates: 44°24′29″N 16°17′31″E
- Country: Bosnia and Herzegovina
- Entity: Federation of Bosnia and Herzegovina
- Canton: Canton 10
- Municipality: Drvar

Area
  - Total: 20.64 km^{2} (7.97 sq mi)

Population (2013)
  - Total: 136
  - Density: 6.59/km^{2} (17.1/sq mi)
- Time zone: UTC+1 (CET)
  - Summer (DST): UTC+2 (CEST)

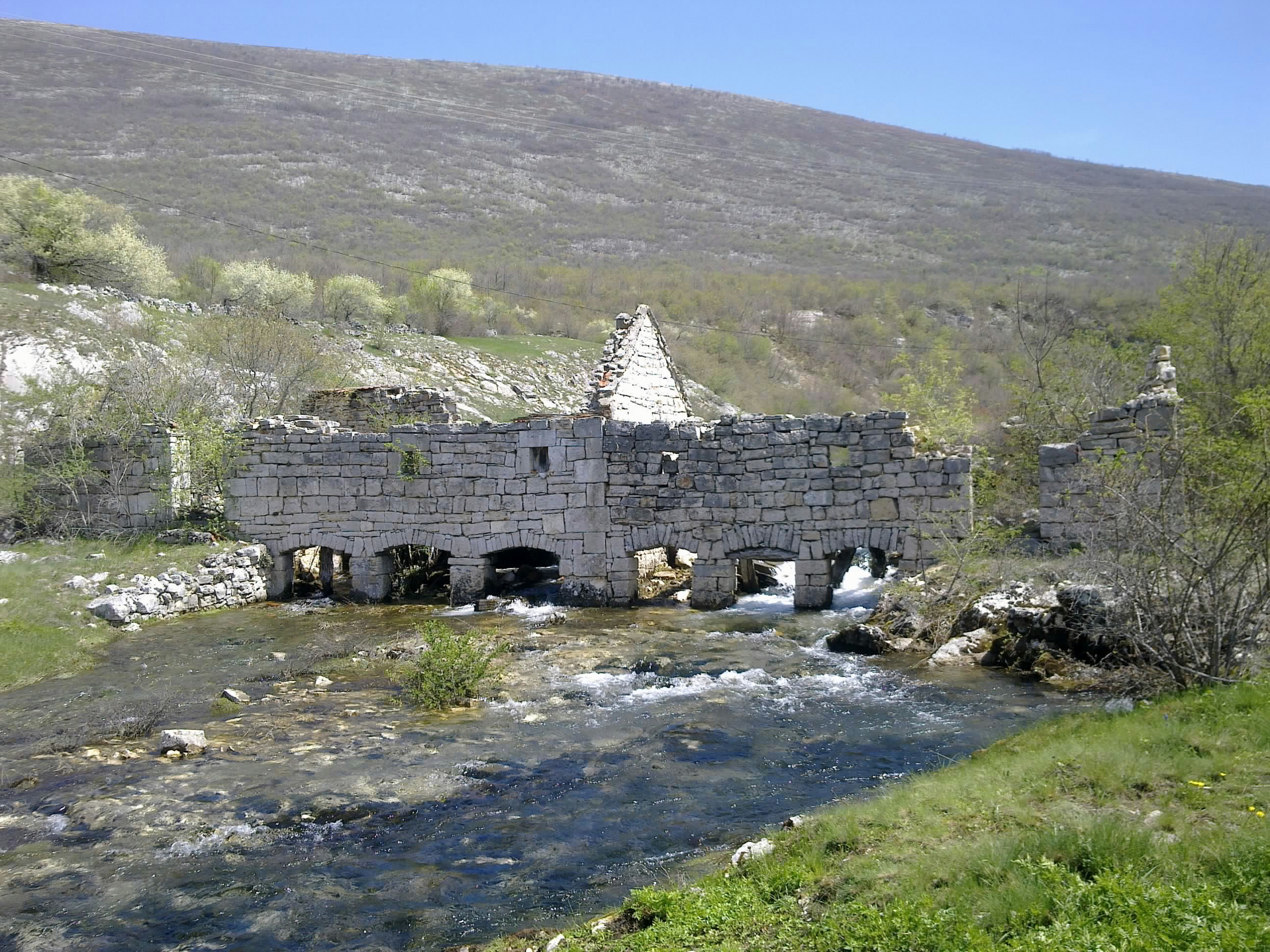
Bastashki Mills

Bastasi (Serbian Cyrillic: Бастаси) is a village in the Municipality of Drvar in Canton 10 of the Federation of Bosnia and Herzegovina, an entity of Bosnia and Herzegovina.

== Demographics ==
According to the 2013 census, its population was 136.

Ethnicity in 2013
Ethnicity	Number	Percentage
Serbs	135	99.3%
Croats	1	0.7%
Total	136	100%

== Bibliography ==
- Ethnicity/National Affiliation, Religion and Mother Tongue (PDF). Sarajevo: Agency for Statistics of Bosnia and Herzegovina. 2019.
