= Šajinovac =

Šajinovac Шајиновац
- Village
- Location within Bosnia and Herzegovina
- Coordinates: 44°16′02″N 16°31′10″E
- Country: Bosnia and Herzegovina
- Entity: Federation of Bosnia and Herzegovina
- Canton: Canton 10
- Municipality: Drvar

Area
  - Total: 5.23 km^{2} (2.02 sq mi)

Population (2013)
  - Total: 4
  - Density: 0.76/km^{2} (2.0/sq mi)
- Time zone: UTC+1 (CET)
  - Summer (DST): UTC+2 (CEST)

Šajinovac (Serbian Cyrillic: Шајиновац) is a village in the Municipality of Drvar in Canton 10 of the Federation of Bosnia and Herzegovina, an entity of Bosnia and Herzegovina.

== Demographics ==
According to the 2013 census, its population was 4, all Serbs.

== Bibliography ==
- Ethnicity/National Affiliation, Religion and Mother Tongue (PDF). Sarajevo: Agency for Statistics of Bosnia and Herzegovina. 2019.
