= Drvar Selo =

- Village
- Location within Bosnia and Herzegovina
- Coordinates: 44.359833°N 16.359702°E
- Country: Bosnia and Herzegovina
- Entity: Federation of Bosnia and Herzegovina
- Canton: Canton 10
- Municipality: Drvar

Area
  - Total: 9.64 km^{2} (3.72 sq mi)

Population (2013)
  - Total: 490
  - Density: 51/km^{2} (130/sq mi)
- Time zone: UTC+1 (CET)
  - Summer (DST): UTC+2 (CEST)

Drvar Selo is a village in the Municipality of Drvar in Canton 10 of the Federation of Bosnia and Herzegovina, an entity of Bosnia and Herzegovina.

== Demographics ==
According to the 2013 census, its population was 490.

Ethnicity in 2013
Ethnicity	Number	Percentage
Serbs	473	96.5%
Croats	12	2.4%
other/undeclared	5	1.0%
Total	490	100%

== Bibliography ==
- Ethnicity/National Affiliation, Religion and Mother Tongue (PDF). Sarajevo: Agency for Statistics of Bosnia and Herzegovina. 2019.
