= Glas Srpske =

Daily newspaper in Bosnia and Herzegovina

- Type: Daily newspaper
- Publisher: AD "Glas Srpske" Banja Luka
- Editor-in-chief: Borjana Radmanović Petrović
- Founded: 1943
- Language: Serbian language
- Headquarters: Skendera Kulenovića 93
- City: Banja Luka, Republika Srpska
- Country: Bosnia and Herzegovina
- ISSN: 1840-1155
- Website: glassrpske.com

The Glas Srpske (Serbian Cyrilic: Глас Српске, lit. 'The Voice of Srpska') is a Republika Srpska daily newspaper published in Banja Luka. Together with Bosniak-oriented Dnevni avaz from Sarajevo and Croat-oriented Večernji list from Mostar, Glas Srpske is Serb-oriented and one of three main ethnic newspapers in Bosnia and Herzegovina addressing various issues primarily from the mainstream or elite perspective among Serbs of Republika Srpska. Glas Srpske is together with Nezavisne novine one of the two newspapers in widest circulation in the entity of Republika Srpska.

The newspaper is described as being politically close to the Alliance of Independent Social Democrats. It is alongside Oslobođenje one of the oldest newspapers in Bosnia and Herzegovina still in circulation.

== History ==
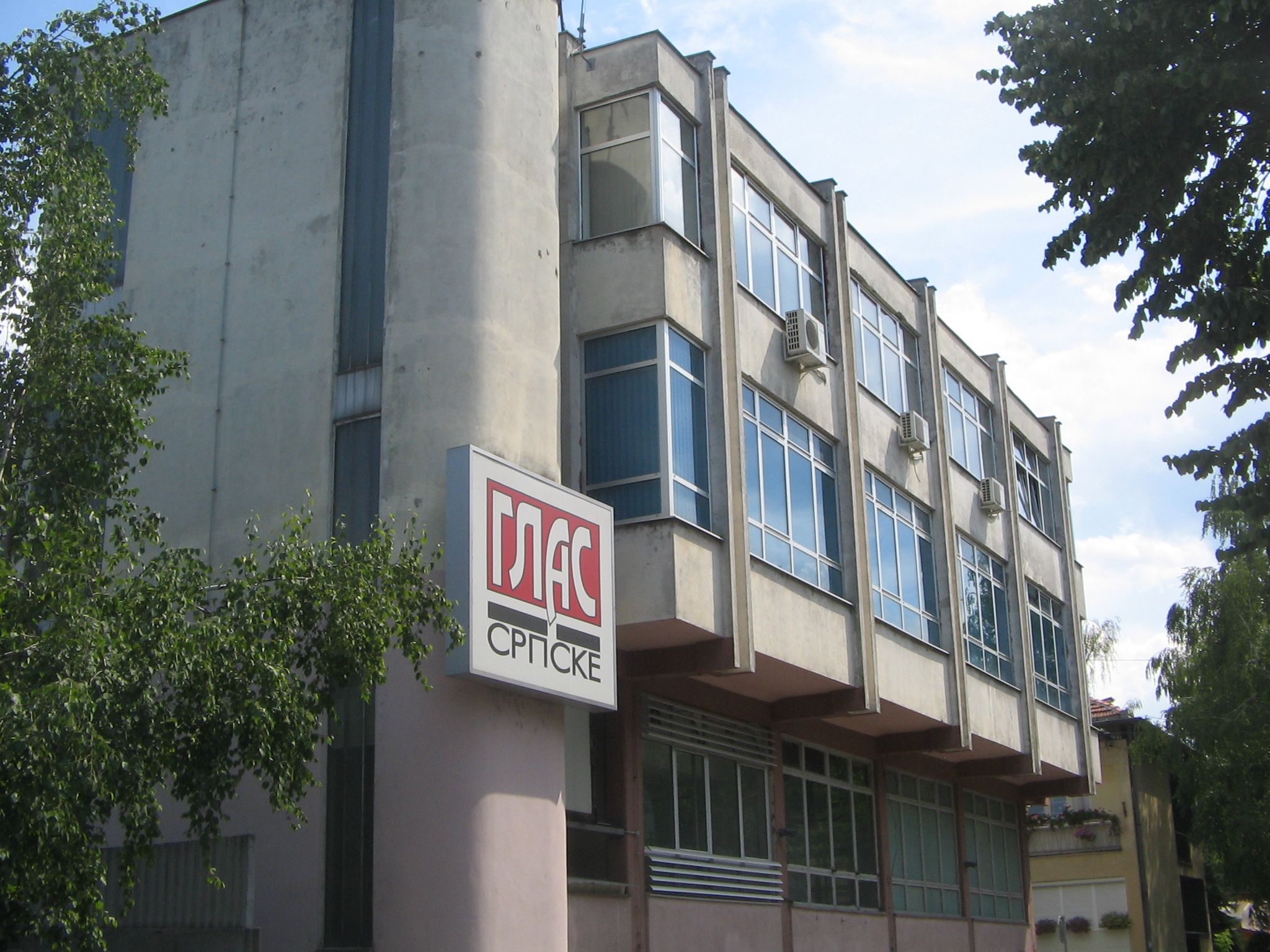
Glas Srpske building in Banja Luka

It was first issued as Glas on 31 July 1943 as a bulletin of the People's Liberation Movement in Krajina region during World War II in Yugoslavia. The issue was published in the village of Župica with the first editorial office including Skender Kulenović, Ilija Došen, Đuro Pucar, Rada Vranješević, Vilko Vinterhalter, Osman Karabegović and Boško Šiljegović. Osman Karabegović recorded that the redaction and printing press moved to Ribnik in August of that year.

For some time it went under the name Banjalučke novine and from 1963 it was again under the name Glas, until 1983 it was a daily newspaper. Between 1973 and 2007 the newspaper published the David Štrbac daily comic created by Miro Mlađenović (1949–2007) who was inspired by Petar Kočić’s literary work.

Since 2003 it goes under the name Glas Srpske and it is a private newspaper in Republika Srpska.
