= Mrđe =

Mrđe Мрђе
- Village
- Location within Bosnia and Herzegovina
- Coordinates: 44°18′03″N 16°29′18″E
- Country: Bosnia and Herzegovina
- Entity: Federation of Bosnia and Herzegovina
- Canton: Canton 10
- Municipality: Drvar

Area
  - Total: 38.09 km^{2} (14.71 sq mi)

Population (2013)
  - Total: 105
  - Density: 2.76/km^{2} (7.14/sq mi)
- Time zone: UTC+1 (CET)
  - Summer (DST): UTC+2 (CEST)

Mrđe (Serbian Cyrillic: Мрђе) is a village in the Municipality of Drvar in Canton 10 of the Federation of Bosnia and Herzegovina, an entity of Bosnia and Herzegovina.

== Demographics ==
According to the 2013 census, its population was 105.

Ethnicity in 2013
Ethnicity	Number	Percentage
Serbs	103	98.1%
other/undeclared	2	1.9%
Total	105	100%

== Bibliography ==
- Ethnicity/National Affiliation, Religion and Mother Tongue (PDF). Sarajevo: Agency for Statistics of Bosnia and Herzegovina. 2019.
