= Motike, Drvar =

Motike Мотике
- Village
- Location within Bosnia and Herzegovina
- Coordinates: 44°16′48″N 16°35′08″E
- Country: Bosnia and Herzegovina
- Entity: Federation of Bosnia and Herzegovina
- Canton: Canton 10
- Municipality: Drvar

Area
  - Total: 10.89 km^{2} (4.20 sq mi)

Population (2013)
  - Total: 28
  - Density: 2.6/km^{2} (6.7/sq mi)
- Time zone: UTC+1 (CET)
  - Summer (DST): UTC+2 (CEST)

Motike (Serbian Cyrillic: Мотике) is a village in the Municipality of Drvar in Canton 10 of the Federation of Bosnia and Herzegovina, an entity of Bosnia and Herzegovina.

== Demographics ==
According to the 2013 census, its population was 28.

Ethnicity in 2013
Ethnicity	Number	Percentage
Serbs	27	96.4%
other/undeclared	1	3.6%
Total	28	100%

== Bibliography ==
- Ethnicity/National Affiliation, Religion and Mother Tongue (PDF). Sarajevo: Agency for Statistics of Bosnia and Herzegovina. 2019.
