= Prekaja =

Prekaja Прекаја
- Village
- Location within Bosnia and Herzegovina
- Coordinates: 44°19′N 16°31′E
- Country: Bosnia and Herzegovina
- Entity: Federation of Bosnia and Herzegovina
- Canton: Canton 10
- Municipality: Drvar

Area
  - Total: 47.52 km^{2} (18.35 sq mi)

Population (2013)
  - Total: 115
  - Density: 2.42/km^{2} (6.27/sq mi)
- Time zone: UTC+1 (CET)
  - Summer (DST): UTC+2 (CEST)

Prekaja (Serbian Cyrillic: Прекаја) is a village in the Municipality of Drvar in Canton 10 of the Federation of Bosnia and Herzegovina, an entity of Bosnia and Herzegovina.

== Demographics ==
According to the 2013 census, its population was 115, all Serbs.

== Bibliography ==
- Ethnicity/National Affiliation, Religion and Mother Tongue (PDF). Sarajevo: Agency for Statistics of Bosnia and Herzegovina. 2019.
