= Vrtoče, Drvar =

Vrtoče Врточе
- Village
- Location within Bosnia and Herzegovina
- Coordinates: 44.387310°N 16.351370°E
- Country: Bosnia and Herzegovina
- Entity: Federation of Bosnia and Herzegovina
- Canton: Canton 10
- Municipality: Drvar

Area
  - Total: 7.74 km^{2} (2.99 sq mi)

Population (2013)
  - Total: 825
  - Density: 107/km^{2} (276/sq mi)
- Time zone: UTC+1 (CET)
  - Summer (DST): UTC+2 (CEST)

Vrtoče (Serbian Cyrillic: Врточе) is a village in the Municipality of Drvar in Canton 10 of the Federation of Bosnia and Herzegovina, an entity of Bosnia and Herzegovina.

== Demographics ==
According to the 2013 census, its population was 825.

Ethnicity in 2013
Ethnicity	Number	Percentage
Serbs	809	98.1%
Croats	9	1.1%
others/undeclared	7	0.8%
Total	825	100%

== Bibliography ==
- Ethnicity/National Affiliation, Religion and Mother Tongue (PDF). Sarajevo: Agency for Statistics of Bosnia and Herzegovina. 2019.
