= Šipovljani =

Šipovljani Шиповљани
- Village
- Location within Bosnia and Herzegovina
- Coordinates: 44°20′59″N 16°24′15″E
- Country: Bosnia and Herzegovina
- Entity: Federation of Bosnia and Herzegovina
- Canton: Canton 10
- Municipality: Drvar

Area
  - Total: 21.70 km^{2} (8.38 sq mi)

Population (2013)
  - Total: 478
  - Density: 22.0/km^{2} (57.1/sq mi)
- Time zone: UTC+1 (CET)
  - Summer (DST): UTC+2 (CEST)

Šipovljani (Serbian Cyrillic: Шиповљани) is a village in the Municipality of Drvar in Canton 10 of the Federation of Bosnia and Herzegovina, an entity of Bosnia and Herzegovina.

== Demographics ==
According to the 2013 census, its population was 478.

Ethnicity in 2013
Ethnicity	Number	Percentage
Serbs	474	99.2%
Croats	1	0.2%
other/undeclared	3	0.6%
Total	478	100%

== Bibliography ==
- Ethnicity/National Affiliation, Religion and Mother Tongue (PDF). Sarajevo: Agency for Statistics of Bosnia and Herzegovina. 2019.
