= Trninić Brijeg =

Trninić Brijeg Трнинић Бријег
- Village
- Location within Bosnia and Herzegovina
- Coordinates: 44°21′09″N 16°22′17″E
- Country: Bosnia and Herzegovina
- Entity: Federation of Bosnia and Herzegovina
- Canton: Canton 10
- Municipality: Drvar

Area
  - Total: 5.84 km^{2} (2.25 sq mi)

Population (2013)
  - Total: 232
  - Density: 39.7/km^{2} (103/sq mi)
- Time zone: UTC+1 (CET)
  - Summer (DST): UTC+2 (CEST)

Trninić Brijeg (Serbian Cyrillic: Трнинић Бријег) is a village in the Municipality of Drvar in Canton 10 of the Federation of Bosnia and Herzegovina, an entity of Bosnia and Herzegovina.

== Demographics ==
According to the 2013 census, its population was 232.

Ethnicity in 2013
Ethnicity	Number	Percentage
Serbs	230	99.1%
Croats	1	0.4%
other/undeclared	1	0.4%
Total	232	100%

== Bibliography ==
- Ethnicity/National Affiliation, Religion and Mother Tongue (PDF). Sarajevo: Agency for Statistics of Bosnia and Herzegovina. 2019.
