= Mokronoge, Drvar =

Mokronoge Мокроноге
- Village
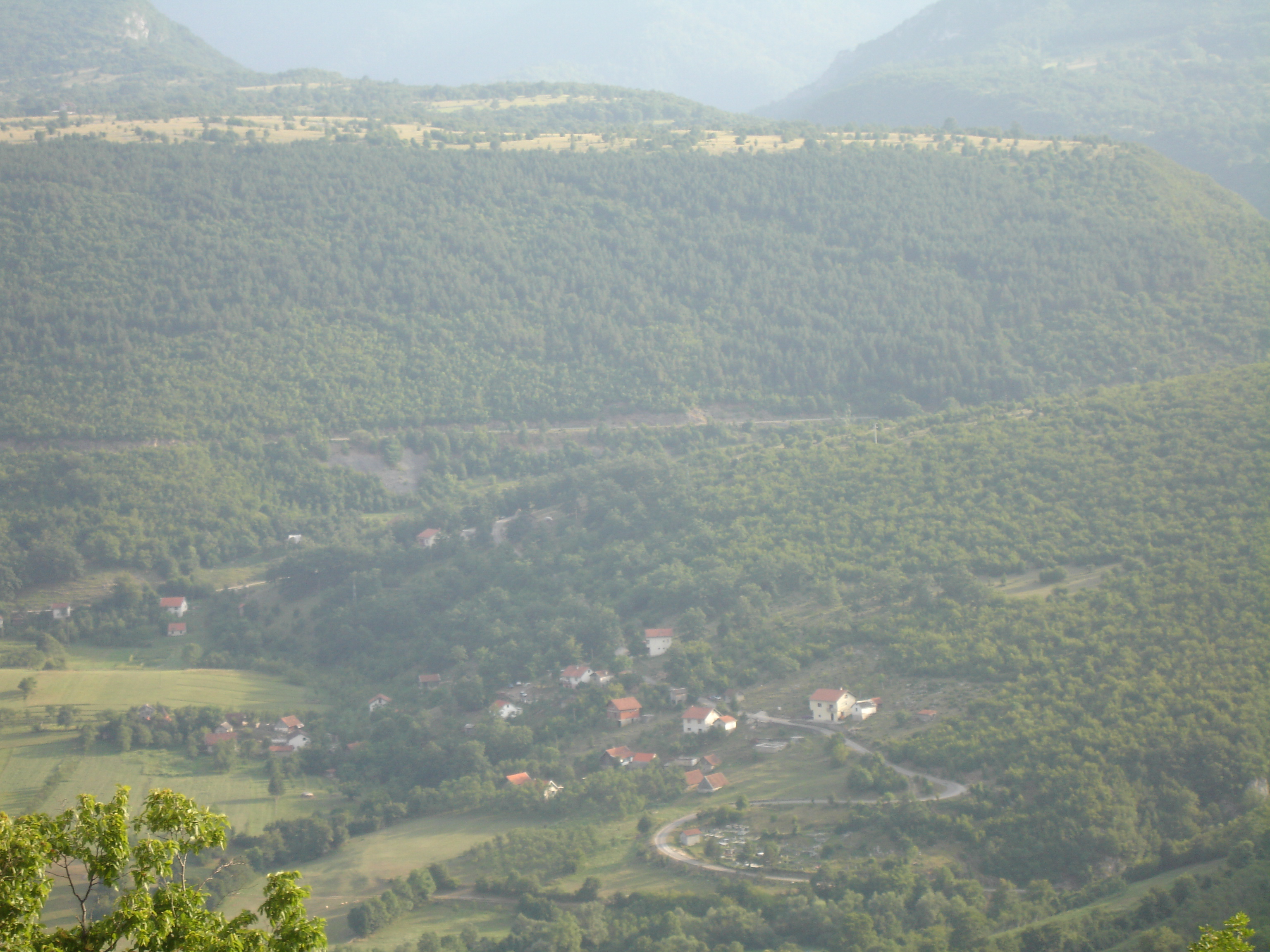

- Location within Bosnia and Herzegovina
- Coordinates: 44°20′38″N 16°27′30″E
- Country: Bosnia and Herzegovina
- Entity: Federation of Bosnia and Herzegovina
- Canton: Canton 10
- Municipality: Drvar

Area
  - Total: 23.50 km^{2} (9.07 sq mi)

Population (2013)
  - Total: 298
  - Density: 12.7/km^{2} (32.8/sq mi)
- Time zone: UTC+1 (CET)
  - Summer (DST): UTC+2 (CEST)

Mokronoge (Serbian Cyrillic: Мокроноге) is a village in the Municipality of Drvar in Canton 10 of the Federation of Bosnia and Herzegovina, an entity of Bosnia and Herzegovina.

== Demographics ==
According to the 2013 census, its population was 298.

Ethnicity in 2013
Ethnicity	Number	Percentage
Serbs	296	99.3%
Croats	1	0.3%
other/undeclared	1	0.3%
Total	298	100%

== Bibliography ==
- Ethnicity/National Affiliation, Religion and Mother Tongue (PDF). Sarajevo: Agency for Statistics of Bosnia and Herzegovina. 2019.
