= Municipality of Drvar =

Municipality of Drvar Општина Дрвар (Serbian) Općina Drvar (Croatian)
- Municipality
- Location of the Municipality of Drvar within Bosnia and Herzegovina
- Country: Bosnia and Herzegovina
- Entity: Federation of Bosnia and Herzegovina
- Canton: Canton 10
- Seat: Drvar

Government
  - Municipal president: Dušica Runić (SNSD)

Area
  - Total: 589.30 km^{2} (227.53 sq mi)

Population (2013)
  - Total: 7,036
  - Density: 11.94/km^{2} (30.92/sq mi)
- Demonym: Drvarian
- Website: www.opstinadrvar.net

Municipality of Drvar (Serbian: Општина Дрвар; Croatian: Općina Drvar) is a municipality in Canton 10 of the Federation of Bosnia and Herzegovina, an entity of Bosnia and Herzegovina. Its seat is in Drvar. According to the 2013 census, the population was 7,036.

== Demographics ==
Nationalities
1. Serbs (82.8%)
2. Croats (16.1%)
3. Others (1.14%)

According to the 2013 census, the population of the municipality was 2,449.

Nationality	Population 2013	%
Serbs	6,420	91.25
Croats	552	7.85
Others	64	0.90
Total	7,036	

== Bibliography ==
- Ethnicity/National Affiliation, Religion and Mother Tongue (PDF). Sarajevo: Agency for Statistics of Bosnia and Herzegovina. 2019.
