= Ključ, Una-Sana Canton =

Ključ Кључ
- Town and municipality
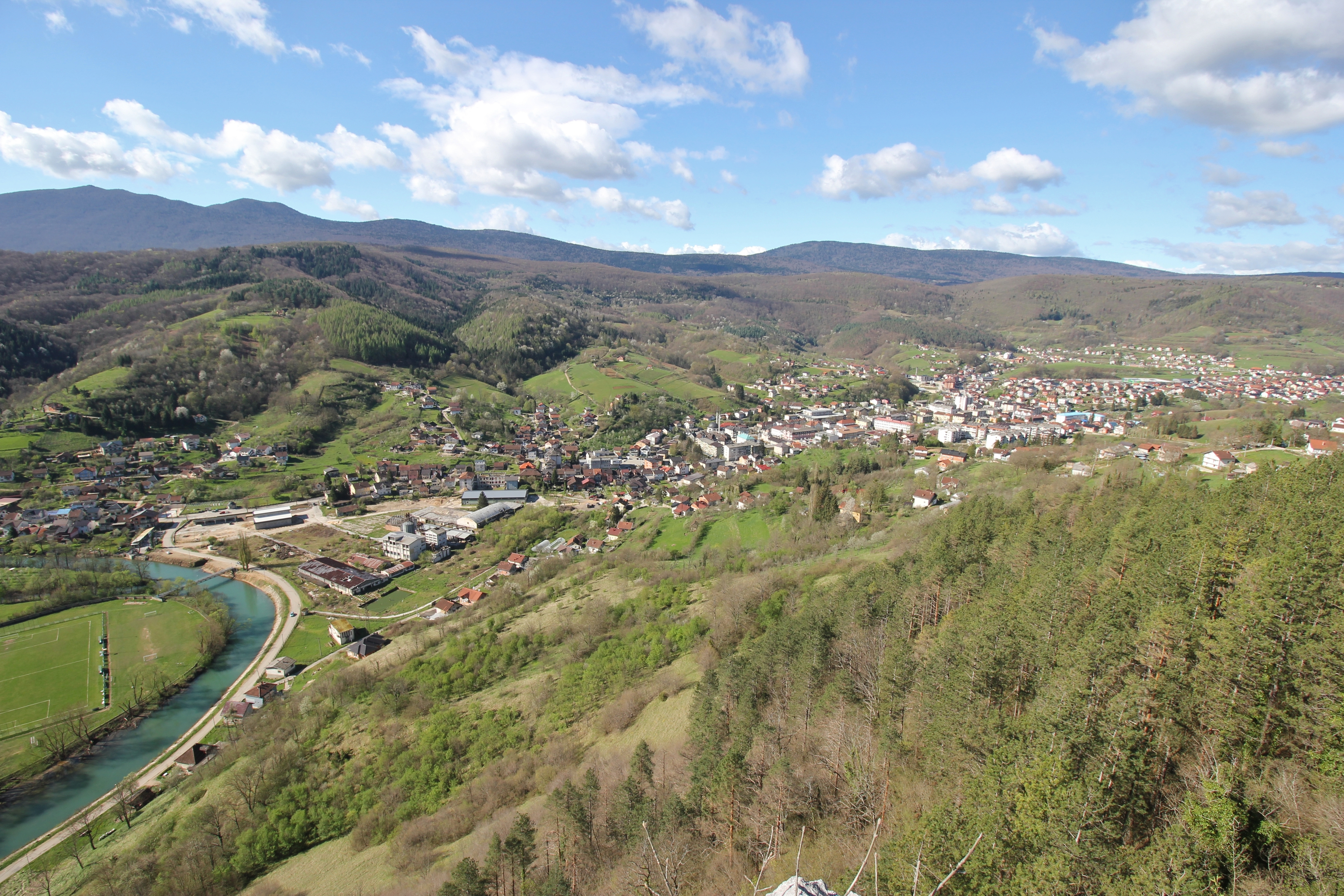
- Panoramic view

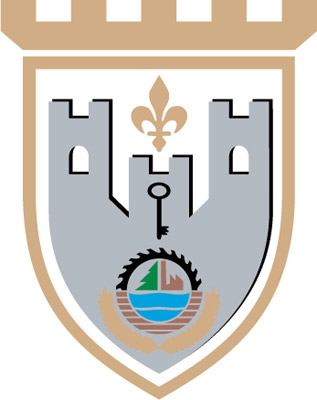
- Flag Seal
- Etymology: Ključ is the Bosnian word for "key"
- Location of Ključ within Bosnia and Herzegovina.

- Location within Bosnia and Herzegovina
- Coordinates: 44°32′N 16°46′E
- Country: Bosnia and Herzegovina
- Entity: Federation of Bosnia and Herzegovina
- Canton: Una-Sana
- Geographical region: Bosanska Krajina

Government
  - Municipality president: Jasmin Musić (SDA)

Area
  - Total: 358 km^{2} (138 sq mi)

Population (2013 census)
  - Total: 18,714
  - Density: 52/km^{2} (130/sq mi)
- Time zone: UTC+1 (CET)
  - Summer (DST): UTC+2 (CEST)
- Area code: +3873766XXXX
- Website: www.opcina-kljuc.ba

Ključ (pronounced [kʎûːtʃ]) is a town and municipality located in the Una-Sana Canton of the Federation of Bosnia and Herzegovina, an entity of Bosnia and Herzegovina. The name of the town and the municipality translates to "Key" in English.

== Geography ==
It is located a short distance south from Sanski Most. The Sana River runs through the municipality. The terrain is heavily forested.

== History ==
Human settlements have existed in the area long before the Roman Era. The town itself is first mentioned in 1322 in the documents of ban Stjepan II Kotromanić. It was conquered by the Ottoman Empire in 1463 as the last Royal Bosnian fortress.

Ključ fortress was first mentioned in 1322. In 1463, during the Ottoman invasion of Bosnia, the last Bosnian king Stjepan Tomašević, took refuge in the city. His surrender and execution marked the downfall of the medieval Bosnian state.

The Charter from 1323 states that Vukoslav is the son of duke Hrvatin, and from this we conclude that the main stronghold of the lords of the Donji Kraji was in the town of Ključ, the center of the parish Banica. In one of his writings, the Ottoman traveler Evliya Çelebi mentions Ključ as being located in Donji Kraji and on the Sana river.

From 1929 to 1941, Ključ was part of the Vrbas Banovina of the Kingdom of Yugoslavia.

As an area with a slight Serb majority, at the start of the war in Bosnia (1992–1995), the Ključ area was held by Bosnian Serb forces. In the summer of 1995, the Bosnian governmental forces took control over it. Most of the pre-war Serb population fled after the Dayton Peace Agreement, the town belongs to the Federation of Bosnia and Herzegovina. Today, it is estimated that about 97% of the population of Ključ are Bosniaks.

== Settlements ==
In 1991, the municipality of Ključ contained 61 settlements:

- Biljani Donji
- Biljani Gornji
- Budelj Gornji
- Busije
- Crkveno
- Crljeni
- Čađavica
- Donja Previja
- Donja Slatina
- Donje Ratkovo
- Donje Sokolovo
- Donji Ramići
- Donji Ribnik
- Donji Vojići
- Donji Vrbljani
- Dragoraj
- Dubočani
- Gornja Previja
- Gornja Slatina
- Gornje Ratkovo
- Gornje Sokolovo
- Gornji Ramići
- Gornji Ribnik
- Gornji Vojići
- Gornji Vrbljani
- Hadžići
- Hasići
- Hripavci
- Humići
- Jarice
- Kamičak
- Ključ
- Kopjenica
- Korjenovo
- Krasulje
- Lanište
- Ljubine
- Međeđe Brdo
- Mijačica
- Peći
- Pištanica
- Plamenice
- Prhovo
- Prisjeka Donja
- Prisjeka Gornja
- Rastoka
- Rudenice
- Sanica
- Sanica Donja
- Sanica Gornja
- Sitnica
- Sredice
- Stražice
- Treskavac
- Velagići
- Velečevo
- Velijašnica
- Velije
- Zableće
- Zavolje
- Zgon

As a result of the war, the villages of Busije, Crkveno, Čađavica, Donja Previja, Donja Slatina, Donji Ribnik, Donji Vrbljani, Dragoraj, Gornja Previja, Gornja Slatina, Gornje Sokolovo, Gornji Ribnik, Gornji Vrbljani, Rastoka, Sitnica, Sredice, Stražice, Treskavac, Velijašnica, Velije et Zableće, as well as parts of Donje Ratkovo, Donje Sokolovo, Dubočani, Gornje Ratkovo, Jarice, Ljubine et Velečevo became a part of Ribnik municipality, Republika Srpska.

Today the municipality of Ključ has 40 settlements:

- Biljani Donji
- Biljani Gornji
- Budelj Gornji
- Crljeni
- Donje Ratkovo (part)
- Donje Sokolovo (part)
- Donji Ramići
- Donji Vojići
- Dubočani (part)
- Gornje Ratkovo (part)
- Gornji Ramići
- Gornji Vojići
- Hadžići
- Hasići
- Hripavci
- Humići
- Jarice (part)
- Kamičak
- Ključ
- Kopjenica
- Korjenovo
- Krasulje
- Lanište
- Ljubine (part)
- Međeđe Brdo
- Mijačica
- Peći
- Pištanica
- Plamenice
- Prhovo
- Prisjeka Donja
- Prisjeka Gornja
- Pudin Han
- Rudenice
- Sanica
- Sanica Donja
- Sanica Gornja
- Velagići
- Velečevo (part)
- Zavolje
- Zgon

== Demographics ==
=== Population ===
Population of settlements – Ključ municipality
	Settlement	1971.	1981.	1991.	2013.
	Total	39,966	40,008	37,391	16,744
1	Biljani Donji			1,552	1,171
2	Crljeni			553	307
3	Donji Vojići			314	233
4	Dubočani			306	226
5	Gornji Ramići			647	382
6	Hadžići			1,553	1,129
7	Hasići			431	234
8	Hripavci			712	531
9	Humići			1,005	742
10	Kamičak			1,005	902
11	Ključ	3,426	4,948	7,869	5,409
12	Krasulje			1,821	1,731
13	Sanica			2,241	1,337
14	Sanica Donja			716	627
15	Velagići			676	465
16	Velečevo			525	409
17	Zgon			690	635

=== Ethnic composition ===
Ethnic composition – Ključ town
	2013.	1991.	1981.	1971.
Total	5,409 (100,0%)	7,869 (100,0%)	4,948 (100,0%)	3,426 (100,0%)
Serbs		4,107 (52,19%)	2,097 (42,38%)	1,387 (40,48%)
Bosniaks		3,036 (38,58%)	1,629 (32,92%)	1,709 (49,88%)
Yugoslavs		419 (5,325%)	980 (19,81%)	69 (2,014%)
Croats		181 (2,300%)	169 (3,416%)	214 (6,246%)
Others		126 (1,601%)	15 (0,303%)	21 (0,613%)
Montenegrins			30 (0,606%)	14 (0,409%)
Albanians			22 (0,445%)	7 (0,204%)
Slovenes			3 (0,061%)	4 (0,117%)
Hungarians			2 (0,040%)	
Macedonians			1 (0,020%)	1 (0,029%)

Ethnic composition – Ključ municipality
	2013.	1991.	1981.	1971.
Total	16,744 (100,0%)	37,391 (100,0%)	40,008 (100,0%)	39,966 (100,0%)
Bosniaks	16,130 (96,33%)	17,696 (47,33%)	16,596 (41,48%)	15,226 (38,10%)
Others	311 (1,857%)	280 (0,749%)	167 (0,417%)	123 (0,308%)
Serbs	273 (1,630%)	18,506 (49,49%)	20,771 (51,92%)	23,892 (59,78%)
Croats	30 (0,179%)	330 (0,883%)	380 (0,950%)	534 (1,336%)
Yugoslavs		579 (1,549%)	2,016 (5,039%)	131 (0,328%)
Montenegrins			40 (0,100%)	29 (0,073%)
Albanians			26 (0,065%)	18 (0,045%)
Slovenes			6 (0,015%)	5 (0,013%)
Macedonians			4 (0,010%)	6 (0,015%)
Hungarians			2 (0,005%)	2 (0,005%)

== Economy ==
The area is connected to other parts of Bosnia by the M-5 highway. Forestry, light industry and tourism are major components of the economy.
