= Slatina =

Slatina may refer to:

== Antarctica ==
- Slatina Peak

== Bosnia and Herzegovina ==
- Slatina, Donji Vakuf, a village in Donji Vakuf Municipality
- Slatina, Foča, a village in Foča Municipality
- Slatina, Jablanica, a village in Jablanica Municipality
- Slatina, Laktaši, a spa resort in Laktaši Municipality
- Srednja Slatina, a village in Šamac Municipality

== Bulgaria ==
- Byala Slatina, a town in Vratsa Province
- Slatina, Sofia, a district of Sofia
- Slatina, Lovech Province, a village in Lovech Municipality
- Slatina, Montana Province, a village in Berkovitsa Municipality
- Slatina, Plovdiv Province, a village in Karlovo Municipality
- Slatina, a village in Sitovo Municipality

== Croatia ==
- Slatina, Croatia, a town in the Virovitica-Podravina County
- Kutinska Slatina, a village in the Sisak-Moslavina County
- Petrova Slatina, a village in the Osijek-Baranja County
- Slatina Pokupska, a village in the Sisak-Moslavina County
- Slatina Svedruška, a village in the Krapina-Zagorje County
- Slatina, Zagreb County, a village near Preseka

== Czech Republic ==
- Slatina (Kladno District), a municipality and village in the Central Bohemian Region
- Slatina (Klatovy District), a municipality and village in the Plzeň Region
- Slatina (Litoměřice District), a municipality and village in the Ústí nad Labem Region
- Slatina (Nový Jičín District), a municipality and village in the Moravian-Silesian Region
- Slatina (Plzeň-North District), a municipality and village in the Plzeň Region
- Slatina (Svitavy District), a municipality and village in the Pardubice Region
- Slatina (Ústí nad Orlicí District), a municipality and village in the Pardubice Region
- Slatina (Znojmo District), a municipality and village in the South Moravian Region
- Slatina nad Úpou, a municipality and village in the Hradec Králové Region
- Slatina nad Zdobnicí, a municipality and village in the Hradec Králové Region
- Horní Slatina, a municipality and village in the South Bohemian Region
- Brno-Slatina, a district of Brno
- Slatina, a village and part of Chudenice
- Slatina, a village and part of Františkovy Lázně
- Slatina, a village and part of Horní Vltavice
- Slatina, a village and part of Hostouň
- Slatina, a part of Hradec Králové

== Montenegro ==
- Slatina, Andrijevica, a village in Andrijevica Municipality
- Slatina, Pljevlja, a village in Pljevlja Municipality
- Slatina, a village in Danilovgrad Municipality
- Slatina, a village in Šavnik Municipality

== Romania ==
- Slatina, Romania, the capital city of Olt County
  - FC Olt Slatina, a defunct association football club
  - CSM Slatina (football), an association football club
  - CSM Slatina (women's handball), a club
- Slatina, Suceava, a commune in Suceava County
- Slatina, a village in Nucșoara Commune, Argeș County
- Slatina-Nera, a village in Sasca Montană Commune, Caraș-Severin County
- Slatina-Timiș, a commune in Caraș-Severin County
- Slatina de Criș, a village in Dezna Commune, Arad County
- Slatina de Mureș, a village in Bârzava, Arad

=== Watercourses ===
- Slatina, a tributary of the river Sebeș in Caraș-Severin County
- Slatina, a tributary of the river Bresnic in Caraș-Severin County
- Slatina, a tributary of the river Putna in Vrancea County
- Slatina, a tributary of the river Trebeș in Bacău County
- Slatina, a tributary of the river Iza in Maramureș County
- Slatina, a tributary of the river Arieșul Mic in Alba County
- Slatina, a tributary of the river Râul Doamnei in Argeș County
- Slatina (Timiș), a tributary of the river Timiș in Caraș-Severin County
- Slatina, a smaller tributary of the river Timiș in Timiș County
- Slatina (Apa Mare), a tributary of the river Apa Mare in Arad and Timiș Counties

== Serbia ==
- Slatina (Čačak), a village in Moravica District
- Slatina (Knjaževac), a village in Zaječar District
- Slatina (Loznica), a village in Mačva District
- Slatina (Negotin), a village in Bor District
- Slatina (Šabac), a village in Mačva District

== Slovakia ==
- Slatina, Levice District, a municipality and village in the Nitra Region
- Slatina nad Bebravou, a municipality and village in the Trenčín Region
- Slatina (Slovakia), a tributary of the river Hron
- Slatina, a village and administrative part of Dohňany
- Slatina, a village and administrative part of Lúky

== Slovenia ==
- Municipality of Rogaška Slatina, a municipality in the Styria Region
  - Rogaška Slatina, a town in the municipality
- Slatina pri Ponikvi, a settlement in the Municipality of Šentjur

== Ukraine ==
- Solotvyno, known in Romanian as Slatina

== See also ==
- Donja Slatina (disambiguation)
- Gornja Slatina (disambiguation)
- Slatine
- Slatino
