= Hasići =

Hasići may refer to:

- Hasići, Glamoč, a village in Bosnia and Herzegovina
- Hasići (Ključ), a village in Bosnia and Herzegovina
