= Sanica =

Sanica may refer to:

- Sanica, Ključ, a village in Bosnia and Herzegovina
- Sanica (river), a tributary to the Sana in Bosnia
- Sanica Gornja, a village in Bosnia and Herzegovina
- Sanica Donja, a village in Bosnia and Herzegovina
