= Dubočani =

Dubočani may refer to the following places in Bosnia and Herzegovina:

- Dubočani, Ključ
- Dubočani, Konjic
- Dubočani, Trebinje
