= Gornja Slatina =

Gornja Slatina may refer to:

In Bosnia and Herzegovina:

- Gornja Slatina (Ribnik) a village in Ribnik municipality
- Gornja Slatina (Šamac) a village in Šamac municipality

In Serbia:

- Gornja Slatina (Leskovac), a village in Leskovac municipality
