= Ljubine =

- Village
- Location within Bosnia and Herzegovina
- Coordinates: 44°33′N 16°50′E
- Country: Bosnia and Herzegovina
- Entity: Federation of Bosnia and Herzegovina; Republika Srpska
- Canton Region: Una-Sana; Banja Luka
- Municipality: Ključ; Ribnik

Area
  - Total: 4.75 sq mi (12.30 km^{2})

Population (2013)
  - Total: 26
  - Density: 5.5/sq mi (2.1/km^{2})
- Time zone: UTC+1 (CET)
  - Summer (DST): UTC+2 (CEST)

Ljubine is a village in the municipalities of Ribnik, Republika Srpska and Ključ, Bosnia and Herzegovina.

== Demographics ==
According to the 2013 census, its population was 26, all Serbs living in the Ribnik part, with no one living in the Ključ part.
