= Gornje Ratkovo =

Gornje Ratkovo Горње Ратково
- Village
- Location within Bosnia and Herzegovina
- Coordinates: 44°35′08″N 16°55′55″E
- Country: Bosnia and Herzegovina
- Entity: Federation of Bosnia and Herzegovina; Republika Srpska
- Canton Region: Una-Sana; Banja Luka
- Municipality: Ključ; Ribnik

Area
  - Total: 40.31 km^{2} (15.56 sq mi)

Population (2013)
  - Total: 235
  - Density: 5.83/km^{2} (15.1/sq mi)
- Time zone: UTC+1 (CET)
  - Summer (DST): UTC+2 (CEST)

Gornje Ratkovo (Cyrillic: Горње Ратково) is a village in the municipalities of Ribnik, Republika Srpska and Ključ.

== Demographics ==
According to the 2013 census, its population was 235, all living in Ribnik and none in the Ključ part.

Ethnicity in 2013
Ethnicity	Number	Percentage
Serbs	234	99.6%
other/undeclared	1	0.4%
Total	235	100%
