= Treskavac, Ribnik =

Coordinates: 44.4444°N 16.8753°E

Treskavac Трескавац
- Village
- Interactive map of Treskavac
- Country: Bosnia and Herzegovina
- Entity: Republika Srpska
- Municipality: Ribnik
- Time zone: UTC+1 (CET)
  - Summer (DST): UTC+2 (CEST)

Treskavac (Serbian Cyrillic: Трескавац) is a village in the municipality of Ribnik, Bosnia and Herzegovina.
