= Zgon =

Zgon or Zgoń may refer to:

- Zgon, Warmian-Masurian Voivodeship, village in northern Poland
- Zgoń, village in southern Poland
- Zgon (Ključ), municipality in Bosnia and Herzegovina
