= Dubočani, Ključ =

Dubočani Дубочани
- Village
- Location within Bosnia and Herzegovina
- Coordinates: 44°30′23″N 16°48′45″E
- Country: Bosnia and Herzegovina
- Entity: Federation of Bosnia and Herzegovina
- Canton: Una-Sana Canton
- Municipality: Ključ

Area
  - Total: 7.11 km^{2} (2.75 sq mi)

Population (2013)
  - Total: 226
  - Density: 31.8/km^{2} (82.3/sq mi)
- Time zone: UTC+1 (CET)
  - Summer (DST): UTC+2 (CEST)

Dubočani (Дубочани) is a village in the municipality of Ključ, Bosnia and Herzegovina. Following the Bosnian War and the signing of the Dayton Agreement in 1995, the pre-war village boundary was split, with a portion of the settlement being allocated to the Ribnik municipality in Republika Srpska.

== History and Geography ==
Prior to the war, Dubočani existed as a single, undivided rural settlement within the Ključ municipality. Following the establishment of the Inter-Entity Boundary Line (IEBL), the larger, populated western section remained a part of the Ključ municipality within the Federation of Bosnia and Herzegovina, while the eastern, unpopulated territorial fragments were administratively assigned to the Ribnik municipality.

== Geography and Infrastructure ==
The village is situated along the right bank of the Sana River. Dubočani is home to the local karst spring known as Okašnica. This natural spring serves as a vital hydrological resource for the region, supplying drinking water to the local network.

In July 2023, the Municipality of Ključ, alongside the Ministry of Agriculture, Water Management and Forestry of the Una-Sana Canton, signed a capital infrastructure co-financing agreement valued at 105,300 KM to construct and expand the "Okašnica" water supply system. Following ongoing grid stability challenges, the Ključ Municipal Council held a targeted session in December 2025 to prioritize infrastructure modernizations for the network. This included formal directives to Elektroprivreda Bosne i Hercegovine to relocate and upgrade the power grid supply directly feeding the Okašnica pumping station to ensure consistent regional water distribution.

== Demographics ==
According to the 2013 official population census, the entirety of the village's active population resided within the Ključ municipality portion, while the Ribnik section recorded zero inhabitants.

=== Ethnic Composition ===
| Ethnicity | 1991 Population | % (1991) | 2013 Population | % (2013) |
|---|---|---|---|---|
| Bosniaks | 73 | 23.7% | 225 | 99.6% |
| Serbs | 234 | 76.0% | 0 | 0.0% |
| Other/Undeclared | 1 | 0.3% | 1 | 0.4% |
| Total | 308 | 100% | 226 | 100% |
