= Donja Slatina =

Donja Slatina refers to:

In Bosnia and Herzegovina:

- Donja Slatina (Ribnik) a village in Ribnik municipality
- Donja Slatina (Šamac) a village in Šamac municipality

In Serbia:

- Donja Slatina (Leskovac), a village in Leskovac municipality
