= Donje Sokolovo =

- Village
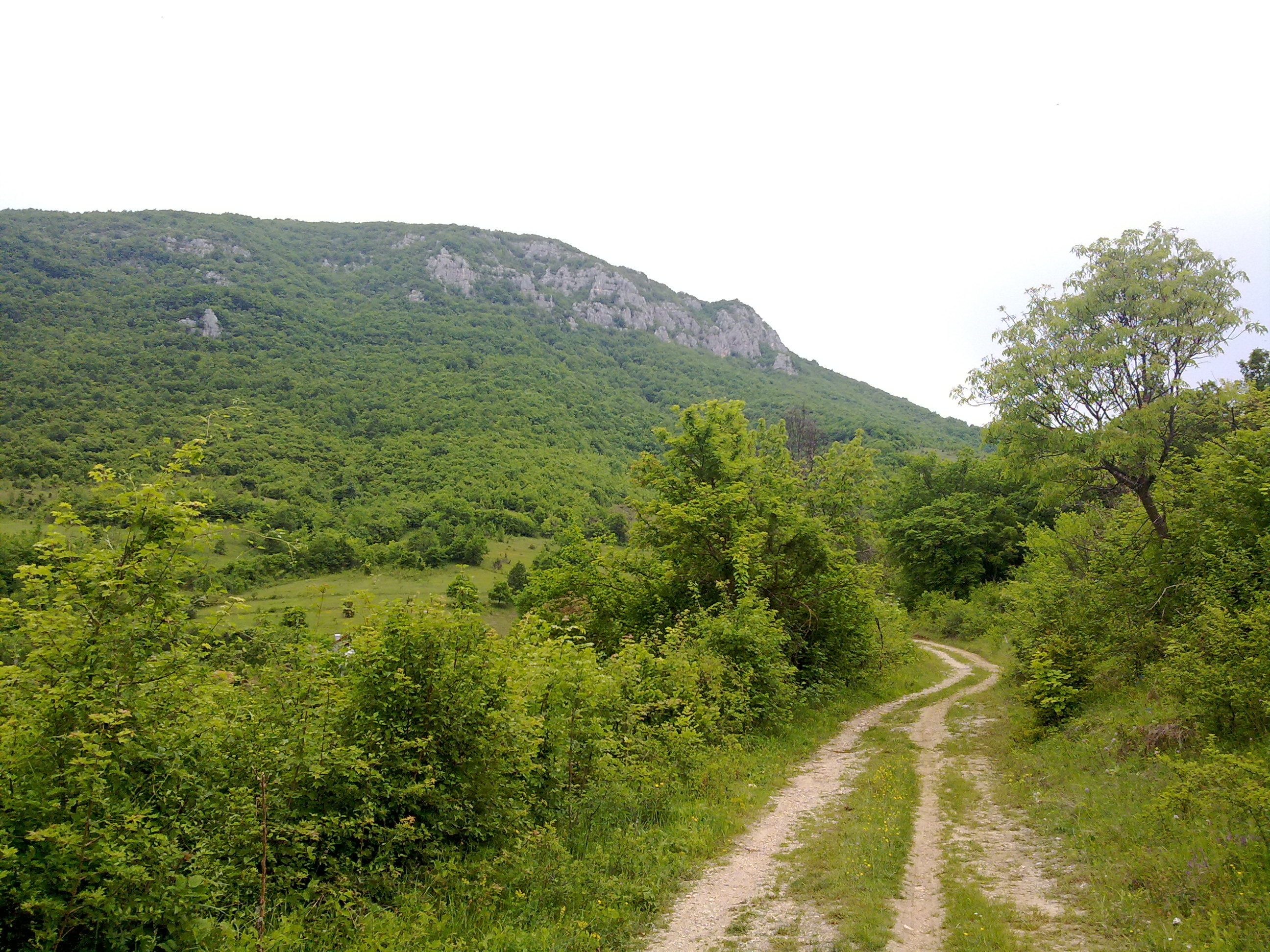
- Landscape near Donje Sokolovo

- Location within Bosnia and Herzegovina
- Coordinates: 44°36′28″N 16°50′23″E
- Country: Bosnia and Herzegovina
- Entity: Federation of Bosnia and Herzegovina; Republika Srpska
- Canton Region: Una-Sana; Banja Luka
- Municipality: Ključ; Ribnik

Area
  - Total: 10.56 sq mi (27.35 km^{2})

Population (2013)
  - Total: 2
  - Density: 0.19/sq mi (0.073/km^{2})
- Time zone: UTC+1 (CET)
  - Summer (DST): UTC+2 (CEST)

Donje Sokolovo is a village in Bosnia and Herzegovina. It is located in the municipalities of Ribnik (RS), and Ključ (FBiH).

== Demographics ==
According to the 2013 census, its population was two, both Serbs, living in the Ključ part, thus none in the Republika Srpska part.
