= Jarice =

- Village
- Location within Bosnia and Herzegovina
- Coordinates: 44°31′N 16°47′E
- Country: Bosnia and Herzegovina
- Entity: Federation of Bosnia and Herzegovina; Republika Srpska
- Canton Region: Una-Sana; Banja Luka
- Municipality: Ključ; Ribnik

Area
  - Total: 9.11 sq mi (23.60 km^{2})

Population (2013)
  - Total: 0
  - Density: 0.0/sq mi (0.0/km^{2})
- Time zone: UTC+1 (CET)
  - Summer (DST): UTC+2 (CEST)

Jarice is a village in the municipalities of Ribnik, Republika Srpska and Ključ, Bosnia and Herzegovina.

== Demographics ==
According to the 2013 census, its population was nil, so none in Ključ and none in the Ribnik part.
