= Donje Ratkovo =

- Village
- Location within Bosnia and Herzegovina
- Coordinates: 44°31′51″N 16°52′31″E
- Country: Bosnia and Herzegovina
- Entity: Federation of Bosnia and Herzegovina; Republika Srpska
- Canton Region: Una-Sana; Banja Luka
- Municipality: Ključ; Ribnik

Area
  - Total: 10.66 sq mi (27.61 km^{2})

Population (2013)
  - Total: 162
  - Density: 15.2/sq mi (5.87/km^{2})
- Time zone: UTC+1 (CET)
  - Summer (DST): UTC+2 (CEST)

Donje Ratkovo is a village in the municipalities of Ribnik, Bosnia and Herzegovina, Republika Srpska and Ključ, Bosnia and Herzegovina .

== Demographics ==
According to the 2013 census, its population was 162, all Serbs with 112 living in the Republika Srpska part and 50 living in the Ključ part.
