= Crkveno =

Crkveno Црквено
- Village
- Location within Bosnia and Herzegovina
- Coordinates: 44°27′06″N 16°44′31″E
- Country: Bosnia and Herzegovina
- Entity: Republika Srpska
- Municipality: Ribnik
- Time zone: UTC+1 (CET)
  - Summer (DST): UTC+2 (CEST)

Crkveno (Serbian Cyrillic: Црквено) is a village in the municipality of Ribnik, Bosnia and Herzegovina.
