= Zavolje =

- Village
- Location within Bosnia and Herzegovina
- Coordinates: 44°37′03″N 16°36′04″E
- Country: Bosnia and Herzegovina
- Entity: Federation of Bosnia and Herzegovina
- Canton: Una-Sana
- Municipality: Ključ

Area
  - Total: 12.40 sq mi (32.12 km^{2})

Population (2013)
  - Total: 2
  - Density: 0.16/sq mi (0.062/km^{2})
- Time zone: UTC+1 (CET)
  - Summer (DST): UTC+2 (CEST)

Zavolje is a village in the municipality of Ključ, Bosnia and Herzegovina.

== Demographics ==
According to the 2013 census, its population was two, both Serbs.
