= Budelj Gornji =

- Village
- Location within Bosnia and Herzegovina
- Coordinates: 44°35′38″N 16°38′18″E
- Country: Bosnia and Herzegovina
- Entity: Federation of Bosnia and Herzegovina
- Canton: Una-Sana
- Municipality: Ključ

Area
  - Total: 8.56 sq mi (22.18 km^{2})

Population (2013)
  - Total: 44
  - Density: 5.1/sq mi (2.0/km^{2})
- Time zone: UTC+1 (CET)
  - Summer (DST): UTC+2 (CEST)

Budelj Gornji is a village in the municipality of Ključ, Bosnia and Herzegovina.

== Demographics ==
According to the 2013 census, its population was 44.

Ethnicity in 2013
Ethnicity	Number	Percentage
Bosniaks	37	84.1%
Croats	0	0.0%
Serbs	7	15.9%
other/undeclared	0	0.0%
Total	44	100%
