= Gornja Previja =

Gornja Previja Горња Превија
- Village
- Location within Bosnia and Herzegovina
- Coordinates: 44°28′52″N 16°51′44″E
- Country: Bosnia and Herzegovina
- Entity: Republika Srpska
- Municipality: Ribnik
- Time zone: UTC+1 (CET)
  - Summer (DST): UTC+2 (CEST)

Gornja Previja (Serbian Cyrillic: Горња Превија) is a village in the municipality of Ribnik, Republika Srpska, Bosnia and Herzegovina.
