= Donji Vojići =

- Village
- Location within Bosnia and Herzegovina
- Coordinates: 44°33′N 16°43′E
- Country: Bosnia and Herzegovina
- Entity: Federation of Bosnia and Herzegovina
- Canton: Una-Sana
- Municipality: Ključ

Area
  - Total: 0.64 sq mi (1.67 km^{2})

Population (2013)
  - Total: 233
  - Density: 361/sq mi (140/km^{2})
- Time zone: UTC+1 (CET)
  - Summer (DST): UTC+2 (CEST)

Donji Vojići is a village in the municipality of Ključ, Bosnia and Herzegovina.

== Demographics ==
According to the 2013 census, its population was 233.

Ethnicity in 2013
Ethnicity	Number	Percentage
Bosniaks	223	95.7%
Serbs	9	3.9%
other/undeclared	1	0.4%
Total	233	100%
