= Crljeni =

- Village
- Location within Bosnia and Herzegovina
- Coordinates: 44°34′34″N 16°51′18″E
- Country: Bosnia and Herzegovina
- Entity: Federation of Bosnia and Herzegovina
- Canton: Una-Sana
- Municipality: Ključ

Area
  - Total: 2.04 sq mi (5.29 km^{2})

Population (2013)
  - Total: 307
  - Density: 150/sq mi (58.0/km^{2})
- Time zone: UTC+1 (CET)
  - Summer (DST): UTC+2 (CEST)

Crljeni is a village in the municipality of Ključ, Bosnia and Herzegovina.

== Demographics ==
According to the 2013 census, its population was 307, all Bosniaks.
