= Biljani Gornji =

Biljani Gornji Биљани Горњи
- Village
- Location within Bosnia and Herzegovina
- Coordinates: 44°36′32″N 16°41′53″E
- Country: Bosnia and Herzegovina
- Entity: Federation of Bosnia and Herzegovina
- Canton: Una-Sana
- Municipality: Ključ

Area
  - Total: 1.78 sq mi (4.60 km^{2})

Population (2013)
  - Total: 136
  - Density: 76.6/sq mi (29.6/km^{2})
- Time zone: UTC+1 (CET)
  - Summer (DST): UTC+2 (CEST)

Biljani Gornji (Serbian Cyrillic: Биљани Горњи) is a village in the municipality of Ključ, Bosnia and Herzegovina.

== Demographics ==
According to the 2013 census, its population was 136.

Ethnicity in 2013
Ethnicity	Number	Percentage
Bosniaks	135	99.3%
other/undeclared	1	0.7%
Total	136	100%
