= Slatino =

Slatino may refer to:

== Bulgaria ==
- Slatino, Kyustendil Province
- Slatino, Pernik Province, a village in Pernik Province

== North Macedonia ==
- Slatino, Debarca
- Slatino, Tearce

== Ukraine ==
- Slatyne, in Kharkiv Oblast

== See also ==
- Slatina (disambiguation)
