= Hasići (Ključ) =

- Village
- Location within Bosnia and Herzegovina
- Coordinates: 44°32′17″N 16°43′45″E
- Country: Bosnia and Herzegovina
- Entity: Federation of Bosnia and Herzegovina; Republika Srpska
- Canton Region: Una-Sana; Banja Luka
- Municipality: Ključ; Ribnik

Area
  - Total: 8.80 sq mi (22.79 km^{2})

Population (2013)
  - Total: 234
  - Density: 26.6/sq mi (10.3/km^{2})
- Time zone: UTC+1 (CET)
  - Summer (DST): UTC+2 (CEST)

Hasići is a village in the municipalities of Ribnik, Republika Srpska and Ključ, Bosnia and Herzegovina .

== Demographics ==
According to the 2013 census, its population was 234, all Bosniaks living in Ključ and none in the Ribnik part.
