= Pištanica =

- Village
- Location within Bosnia and Herzegovina
- Coordinates: 44°37′17″N 16°42′52″E
- Country: Bosnia and Herzegovina
- Entity: Federation of Bosnia and Herzegovina
- Canton: Una-Sana
- Municipality: Ključ

Area
  - Total: 2.02 sq mi (5.22 km^{2})

Population (2013)
  - Total: 26
  - Density: 13/sq mi (5.0/km^{2})
- Time zone: UTC+1 (CET)
  - Summer (DST): UTC+2 (CEST)

Pištanica is a village in the municipality of Ključ, Bosnia and Herzegovina.

== Demographics ==
According to the 2013 census, its population was 26, all Bosniaks.
