= Rastoka, Bosnia and Herzegovina =

Rastoka Растока
- Village
- Location within Bosnia and Herzegovina
- Coordinates: 44°27′30″N 16°50′36″E
- Country: Bosnia and Herzegovina
- Entity: Republika Srpska
- Municipality: Ribnik
- Time zone: UTC+1 (CET)
  - Summer (DST): UTC+2 (CEST)

Rastoka (Serbian Cyrillic: Растока) is a village in the municipality of Ribnik, Bosnia and Herzegovina.
