= Donja Previja =

Donja Previja Доња Превија
- Village
- Location within Bosnia and Herzegovina
- Coordinates: 44°28′13″N 16°50′39″E
- Country: Bosnia and Herzegovina
- Entity: Republika Srpska
- Municipality: Ribnik
- Time zone: UTC+1 (CET)
  - Summer (DST): UTC+2 (CEST)

Donja Previja (Cyrillic: Доња Превија) is a village in the municipality of Ribnik, Bosnia and Herzegovina.
