= Dragoraj =

Dragoraj Драгорај
- Village
- Location within Bosnia and Herzegovina
- Coordinates: 44°28′59″N 16°52′29″E
- Country: Bosnia and Herzegovina
- Entity: Republika Srpska
- Municipality: Ribnik
- Time zone: UTC+1 (CET)
  - Summer (DST): UTC+2 (CEST)

Dragoraj (Serbian Cyrillic: Драгорај) is a village in the municipality of Ribnik, Republika Srpska, Bosnia and Herzegovina.
