= Plamenice =

- Village
- Location within Bosnia and Herzegovina
- Coordinates: 44°34′41″N 16°48′54″E
- Country: Bosnia and Herzegovina
- Entity: Federation of Bosnia and Herzegovina
- Canton: Una-Sana
- Municipality: Ključ

Area
  - Total: 3.58 sq mi (9.28 km^{2})

Population (2013)
  - Total: 95
  - Density: 27/sq mi (10/km^{2})
- Time zone: UTC+1 (CET)
  - Summer (DST): UTC+2 (CEST)

Plamenice is a village in the municipality of Ključ, Bosnia and Herzegovina.

== Demographics ==
According to the 2013 census, its population was 26, all Bosniaks.
