= Biljani Donji =

Biljani Donji Биљани Доњи
- Village
- Location within Bosnia and Herzegovina
- Coordinates: 44°36′37″N 16°39′57″E
- Country: Bosnia and Herzegovina
- Entity: Federation of Bosnia and Herzegovina
- Canton: Una-Sana
- Municipality: Ključ

Area
  - Total: 2.42 sq mi (6.26 km^{2})

Population (2013)
  - Total: 1,171
  - Density: 484/sq mi (187/km^{2})
- Time zone: UTC+1 (CET)
  - Summer (DST): UTC+2 (CEST)

Biljani Donji (Serbian Cyrillic: Биљани Доњи) is a village in the municipality of Ključ, Bosnia and Herzegovina.

== Demographics ==
According to the 2013 census, its population was 1,171.

Ethnicity in 2013
Ethnicity	Number	Percentage
Bosniaks	1,170	99.9%
other/undeclared	1	0.1%
Total	1,171	100%
