= Prhovo (Ključ) =

- Village
- Location within Bosnia and Herzegovina
- Coordinates: 44.5955°N 16.8001°E
- Country: Bosnia and Herzegovina
- Entity: Federation of Bosnia and Herzegovina
- Canton: Una-Sana
- Municipality: Ključ

Area
  - Total: 2.86 sq mi (7.41 km^{2})

Population (2013)
  - Total: 25
  - Density: 8.7/sq mi (3.4/km^{2})
- Time zone: UTC+1 (CET)
  - Summer (DST): UTC+2 (CEST)

Prhovo is a village in the municipality of Ključ, Bosnia and Herzegovina.

== Demographics ==
According to the 2013 census, its population was 25, all Bosniaks.
