= Gornji Vojići =

- Village
- Location within Bosnia and Herzegovina
- Coordinates: 44°33′N 16°43′E
- Country: Bosnia and Herzegovina
- Entity: Federation of Bosnia and Herzegovina
- Canton: Una-Sana
- Municipality: Ključ

Area
  - Total: 4.36 sq mi (11.28 km^{2})

Population (2013)
  - Total: 183
  - Density: 42.0/sq mi (16.2/km^{2})
- Time zone: UTC+1 (CET)
  - Summer (DST): UTC+2 (CEST)

Gornji Vojići is a village in the municipality of Ključ, Bosnia and Herzegovina.

== Demographics ==
According to the 2013 census, its population was 183, all Bosniaks.
