= Krasulje =

- Village
- Location within Bosnia and Herzegovina
- Coordinates: 44.5989°N 16.7519°E
- Country: Bosnia and Herzegovina
- Entity: Federation of Bosnia and Herzegovina
- Canton: Una-Sana
- Municipality: Ključ

Area
  - Total: 7.12 sq mi (18.44 km^{2})

Population (2013)
  - Total: 1,731
  - Density: 243.1/sq mi (93.87/km^{2})
- Time zone: UTC+1 (CET)
  - Summer (DST): UTC+2 (CEST)

Krasulje is a village in the municipality of Ključ, Bosnia and Herzegovina.

== Demographics ==
According to the 2013 census, its population was 1,731.

Ethnicity in 2013
Ethnicity	Number	Percentage
Bosniaks	1,729	99.9%
other/undeclared	2	0.1%
Total	1,731	100%
