= Hadžići (Ključ) =

- Village
- Location within Bosnia and Herzegovina
- Coordinates: 44.5497°N 16.7503°E
- Country: Bosnia and Herzegovina
- Entity: Federation of Bosnia and Herzegovina
- Canton: Una-Sana
- Municipality: Ključ

Area
  - Total: 2.08 sq mi (5.39 km^{2})

Population (2013)
  - Total: 1,129
  - Density: 543/sq mi (209/km^{2})
- Time zone: UTC+1 (CET)
  - Summer (DST): UTC+2 (CEST)

Hadžići (Ključ) is a village in the municipality of Ključ, Bosnia and Herzegovina.

== Demographics ==
According to the 2013 census, its population was 1,129.

Ethnicity in 2013
Ethnicity	Number	Percentage
Bosniaks	1,030	91.2%
Croats	2	0.2%
other/undeclared	97	8.6%
Total	1,129	100%
