= Gornji Ramići =

- Village
- Location within Bosnia and Herzegovina
- Coordinates: 44°35′N 16°43′E
- Country: Bosnia and Herzegovina
- Entity: Federation of Bosnia and Herzegovina
- Canton: Una-Sana
- Municipality: Ključ

Area
  - Total: 1.88 sq mi (4.86 km^{2})

Population (2013)
  - Total: 382
  - Density: 204/sq mi (78.6/km^{2})
- Time zone: UTC+1 (CET)
  - Summer (DST): UTC+2 (CEST)

Gornji Ramići is a village in the municipality of Ključ, Bosnia and Herzegovina.

== Demographics ==
According to the 2013 census, its population was 382.

Ethnicity in 2013
Ethnicity	Number	Percentage
Bosniaks	381	99.7%
other/undeclared	1	0.3%
Total	382	100%
