= Kopjenica =

- Village
- Location within Bosnia and Herzegovina
- Coordinates: 44°33′38″N 16°41′38″E
- Country: Bosnia and Herzegovina
- Entity: Federation of Bosnia and Herzegovina
- Canton: Una-Sana
- Municipality: Ključ

Area
  - Total: 4.16 sq mi (10.78 km^{2})

Population (2013)
  - Total: 37
  - Density: 8.9/sq mi (3.4/km^{2})
- Time zone: UTC+1 (CET)
  - Summer (DST): UTC+2 (CEST)

Kopjenica is a village in the municipality of Ključ, Bosnia and Herzegovina.

== Demographics ==
According to the 2013 census, its population was 37.

Ethnicity in 2013
Ethnicity	Number	Percentage
Serbs	33	89.2%
Bosniaks	3	8.1%
other/undeclared	1	2.7%
Total	37	100%
