= Korjenovo =

- Village
- Location within Bosnia and Herzegovina
- Coordinates: 44°38′04″N 16°40′24″E
- Country: Bosnia and Herzegovina
- Entity: Federation of Bosnia and Herzegovina
- Canton: Una-Sana
- Municipality: Ključ

Area
  - Total: 2.24 sq mi (5.80 km^{2})

Population (2013)
  - Total: 2
  - Density: 0.89/sq mi (0.34/km^{2})
- Time zone: UTC+1 (CET)
  - Summer (DST): UTC+2 (CEST)

Korjenovo is a village in the municipality of Ključ, Bosnia and Herzegovina.

== Demographics ==
According to the 2013 census, its population was two, both Bosniaks.
