= Peći (Ključ) =

Peći Пећи
- Village
- Location within Bosnia and Herzegovina
- Coordinates: 44°37′38″N 16°47′10″E
- Country: Bosnia and Herzegovina
- Entity: Federation of Bosnia and Herzegovina
- Canton: Una-Sana
- Municipality: Ključ

Area
  - Total: 4.52 sq mi (11.70 km^{2})

Population (2013)
  - Total: 0
  - Density: 0.0/sq mi (0.0/km^{2})
- Time zone: UTC+1 (CET)
  - Summer (DST): UTC+2 (CEST)

Peći is a village in the municipality of Ključ, Bosnia and Herzegovina.

== Demographics ==
According to the 2013 census, its population was nil, down from 292 in 1991.
