= Velijašnica =

Velijašnica Велијашница
- Village
- Location within Bosnia and Herzegovina
- Coordinates: 44°24′55″N 16°50′06″E
- Country: Bosnia and Herzegovina
- Entity: Republika Srpska
- Municipality: Ribnik
- Time zone: UTC+1 (CET)
  - Summer (DST): UTC+2 (CEST)

Velijašnica (Serbian Cyrillic: Велијашница) is a village in the municipality of Ribnik, Republika Srpska, Bosnia and Herzegovina.
