= Hripavci =

- Village
- Location within Bosnia and Herzegovina
- Coordinates: 44°35′33″N 16°46′01″E
- Country: Bosnia and Herzegovina
- Entity: Federation of Bosnia and Herzegovina
- Canton: Una-Sana
- Municipality: Ključ

Area
  - Total: 3.49 sq mi (9.03 km^{2})

Population (2013)
  - Total: 531
  - Density: 152/sq mi (58.8/km^{2})
- Time zone: UTC+1 (CET)
  - Summer (DST): UTC+2 (CEST)

Hripavci is a village in the municipality of Ključ, Bosnia and Herzegovina.

== Demographics ==
According to the 2013 census, its population was 531.

Ethnicity in 2013
Ethnicity	Number	Percentage
Bosniaks	529	99.6%
Croats	1	0.2%
other/undeclared	1	0.2%
Total	531	100%
