= Rudenice (Ključ) =

Rudenice Руденице
- Village
- Location within Bosnia and Herzegovina
- Coordinates: 44.5216°N 16.8014°E
- Country: Bosnia and Herzegovina
- Entity: Federation of Bosnia and Herzegovina
- Canton: Una-Sana
- Municipality: Ključ

Area
  - Total: 1.72 sq mi (4.46 km^{2})

Population (2013)
  - Total: 98
  - Density: 57/sq mi (22/km^{2})
- Time zone: UTC+1 (CET)
  - Summer (DST): UTC+2 (CEST)

Rudenice is a village in the municipality of Ključ, Bosnia and Herzegovina.

== Demographics ==
According to the 2013 census, its population was 98.

Ethnicity in 2013
Ethnicity	Number	Percentage
Bosniaks	52	53.1%
Serbs	28	28.6%
other/undeclared	18	18.4%
Total	98	100%
