= Gornje Sokolovo =

Gornje Sokolovo Горње Соколово
- Village
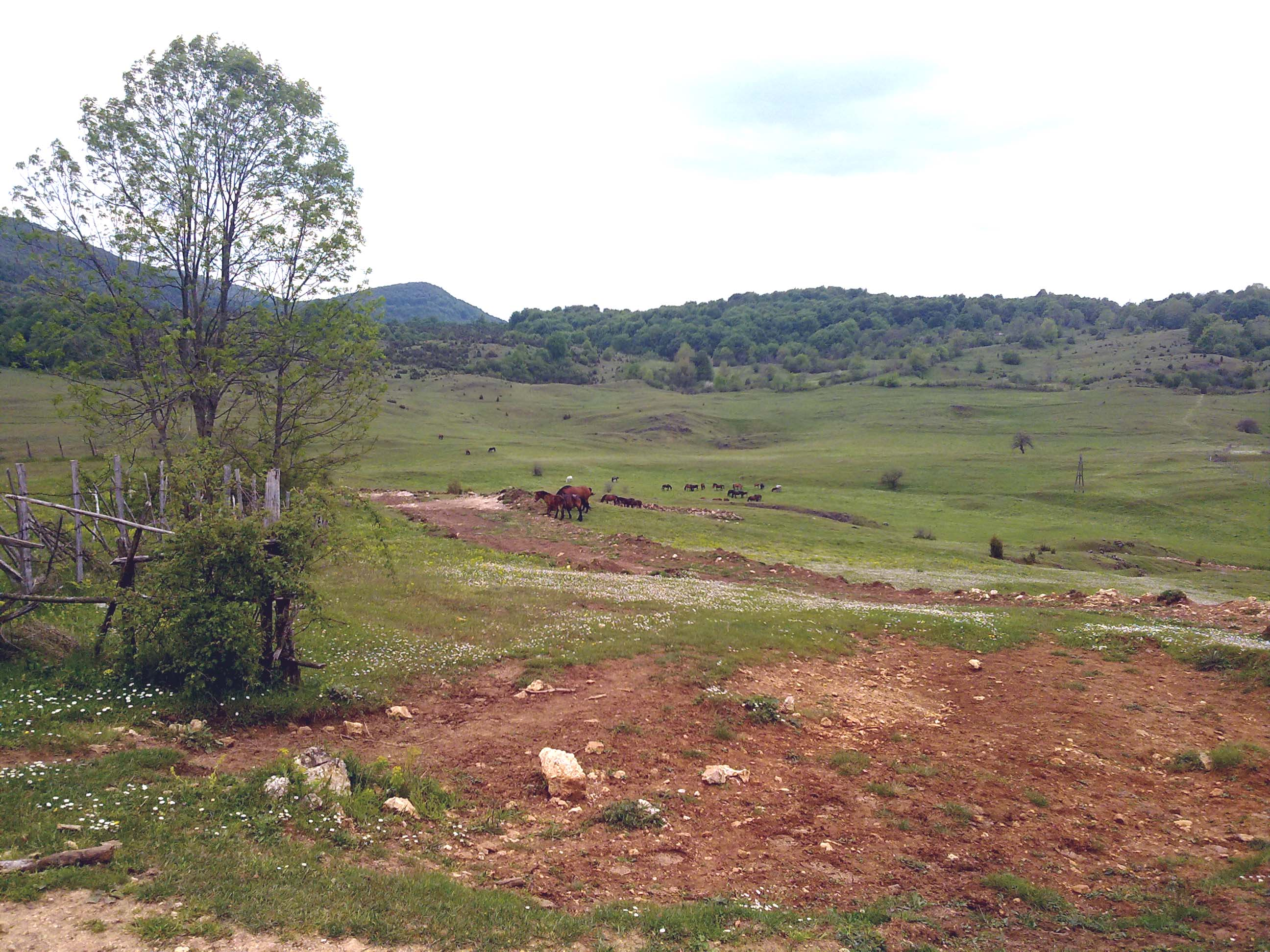
- Landscape near Gornje Sokolovo

- Location within Bosnia and Herzegovina
- Coordinates: 44°36′02″N 16°54′16″E
- Country: Bosnia and Herzegovina
- Entity: Republika Srpska
- Municipality: Ribnik
- Time zone: UTC+1 (CET)
  - Summer (DST): UTC+2 (CEST)

Gornje Sokolovo (Serbian Cyrillic: Горње Соколово) is a village in the municipality of Ribnik, Republika Srpska, Bosnia and Herzegovina.
