= Donji Ramići =

- Village
- Location within Bosnia and Herzegovina
- Coordinates: 44°35′N 16°44′E
- Country: Bosnia and Herzegovina
- Entity: Federation of Bosnia and Herzegovina
- Canton: Una-Sana
- Municipality: Ključ

Area
  - Total: 1.39 sq mi (3.59 km^{2})

Population (2013)
  - Total: 23
  - Density: 17/sq mi (6.4/km^{2})
- Time zone: UTC+1 (CET)
  - Summer (DST): UTC+2 (CEST)

Donji Ramići is a village in the municipality of Ključ, Bosnia and Herzegovina.

== Demographics ==
According to the 2013 census, its population was 23, all Bosniaks.
