= Stražice =

Stražice Стражице
- Village
- Location within Bosnia and Herzegovina
- Coordinates: 44°31′N 16°59′E
- Country: Bosnia and Herzegovina
- Entity: Republika Srpska
- Municipality: Ribnik
- Time zone: UTC+1 (CET)
  - Summer (DST): UTC+2 (CEST)

Stražice (Serbian Cyrillic: Стражице) is a village in the municipality of Ribnik, Bosnia and Herzegovina.
