= Humići =

- Village
- Location within Bosnia and Herzegovina
- Coordinates: 44°34′N 16°47′E
- Country: Bosnia and Herzegovina
- Entity: Federation of Bosnia and Herzegovina
- Canton: Una-Sana
- Municipality: Ključ

Area
  - Total: 4.52 sq mi (11.70 km^{2})

Population (2013)
  - Total: 742
  - Density: 164/sq mi (63.4/km^{2})
- Time zone: UTC+1 (CET)
  - Summer (DST): UTC+2 (CEST)

Humići is a village in the municipality of Ključ, Bosnia and Herzegovina.

== Demographics ==
According to the 2013 census, its population was 742.

Ethnicity in 2013
Ethnicity	Number	Percentage
Bosniaks	740	99.7%
other/undeclared	2	0.3%
Total	742	100%
