= Sanica Gornja =

- Village
- Location within Bosnia and Herzegovina
- Coordinates: 44°37′N 16°37′E
- Country: Bosnia and Herzegovina
- Entity: Federation of Bosnia and Herzegovina
- Canton: Una-Sana
- Municipality: Ključ

Area
  - Total: 5.37 sq mi (13.92 km^{2})

Population (2013)
  - Total: 62
  - Density: 12/sq mi (4.5/km^{2})
- Time zone: UTC+1 (CET)
  - Summer (DST): UTC+2 (CEST)

Sanica Gornja is a village in the municipality of Ključ, Bosnia and Herzegovina.

== Demographics ==
According to the 2013 census, its population was 62.

Ethnicity in 2013
Ethnicity	Number	Percentage
Serbs	34	54.8%
Bosniaks	28	45.2%
Total	62	100%
