= Sanica Donja =

- Village
- Location within Bosnia and Herzegovina
- Coordinates: 44°38′N 16°42′E
- Country: Bosnia and Herzegovina
- Entity: Federation of Bosnia and Herzegovina
- Canton: Una-Sana
- Municipality: Ključ

Area
  - Total: 1.90 sq mi (4.93 km^{2})

Population (2013)
  - Total: 627
  - Density: 329/sq mi (127/km^{2})
- Time zone: UTC+1 (CET)
  - Summer (DST): UTC+2 (CEST)

Sanica Donja is a village in the municipality of Ključ, Bosnia and Herzegovina.

== Demographics ==
According to the 2013 census, its population was 627.

Ethnicity in 2013
| Ethnicity | Number | Percentage |
|---|---|---|
| Bosniaks | 624 | 99.5% |
| Croats | 1 | 0.2% |
| other/undeclared | 2 | 0.3% |
| Total | 627 | 100% |
