= Gornja Slatina, Ribnik =

Gornja Slatina Горња Слатина
- Village
- Location within Bosnia and Herzegovina
- Coordinates: 44°23′02″N 16°53′00″E
- Country: Bosnia and Herzegovina
- Entity: Republika Srpska
- Municipality: Ribnik
- Time zone: UTC+1 (CET)
  - Summer (DST): UTC+2 (CEST)

Gornja Slatina (Serbian Cyrillic: Горња Слатина) is a village in the municipality of Ribnik, Republika Srpska, Bosnia and Herzegovina.

== Geography ==
The village is located on the right bank of the Sana River, under the mountain Dimitor and borders on the villages of Medna and Graci in the municipality of Mrkonjić Grad and the village of Donja Slatina in the municipality of Ribnik. Ribnik Municipality is only 9 km away and is connected by an asphalt road.

In accordance with the 2002 census, 210 people live in the village.
