= Gornja Slatina (Leskovac) =

Gornja Slatina Горња Слатина
- Village
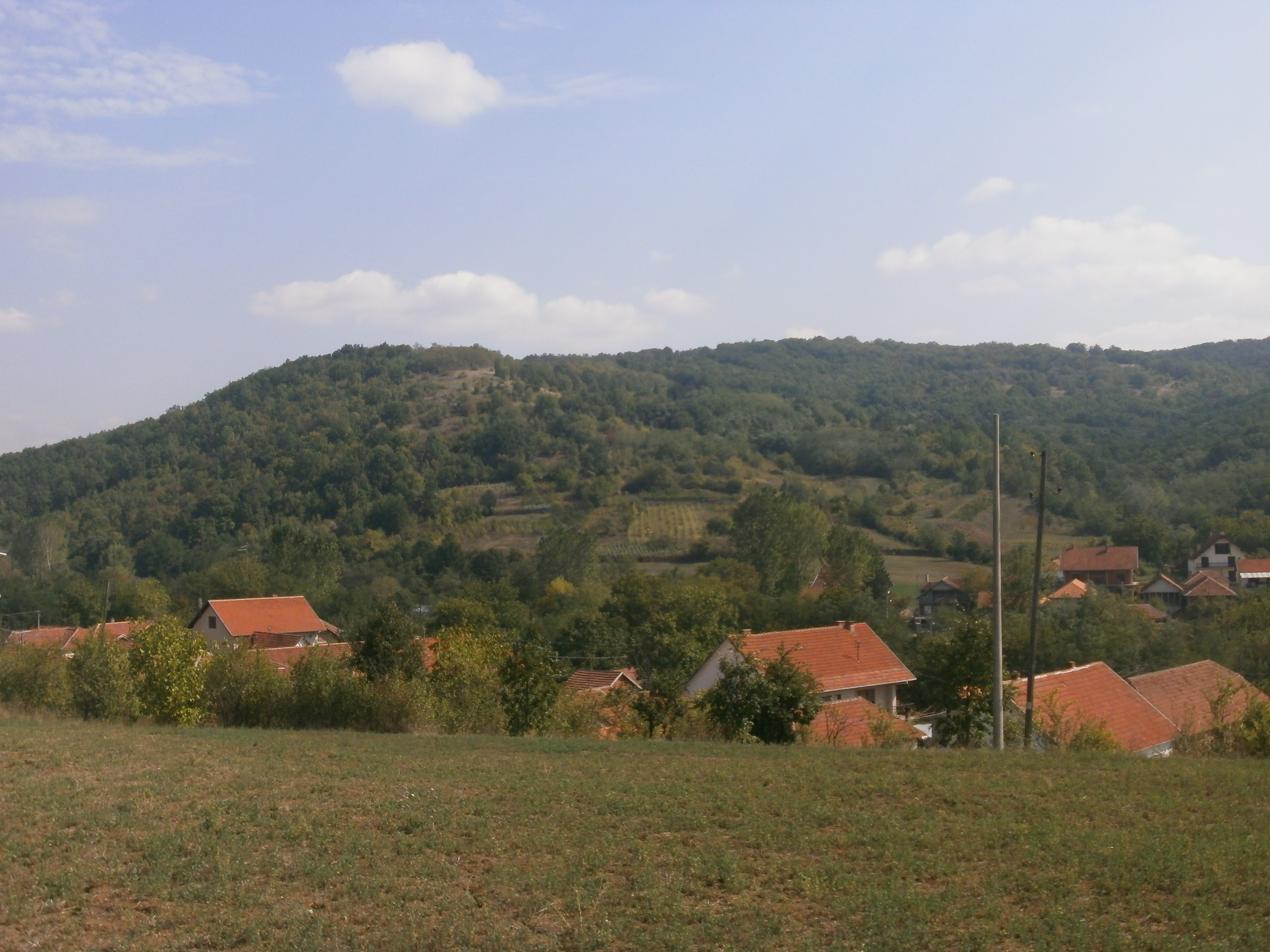

- Location within Serbia
- Coordinates: 43°01′N 22°02′E
- Country: Serbia
- District: Jablanica District
- Municipality: Leskovac
- Elevation: 971 ft (296 m)

Population (2002)
  - Total: 210
- Time zone: UTC+1 (CET)
  - Summer (DST): UTC+2 (CEST)

Gornja Slatina is a village in the municipality of Leskovac, Serbia. According to the 2002 census, the village has a population of 210 people.
