= Zgon (Ključ) =

- Village
- Location within Bosnia and Herzegovina
- Country: Bosnia and Herzegovina
- Entity: Federation of Bosnia and Herzegovina
- Canton: Una-Sana
- Municipality: Ključ

Area
  - Total: 2.20 sq mi (5.70 km^{2})

Population (2013)
  - Total: 635
  - Density: 289/sq mi (111/km^{2})
- Time zone: UTC+1 (CET)
  - Summer (DST): UTC+2 (CEST)

Zgon is a village in the municipality of Ključ, Bosnia and Herzegovina.

== Demographics ==
According to the 2013 census, its population was 635.

Ethnicity in 2013
Ethnicity	Number	Percentage
Bosniaks	631	99.4%
other/undeclared	4	0.6%
Total	635	100%
