= Slatina, Levice District =

Slatina, Levice District Szalatnya
- Municipality
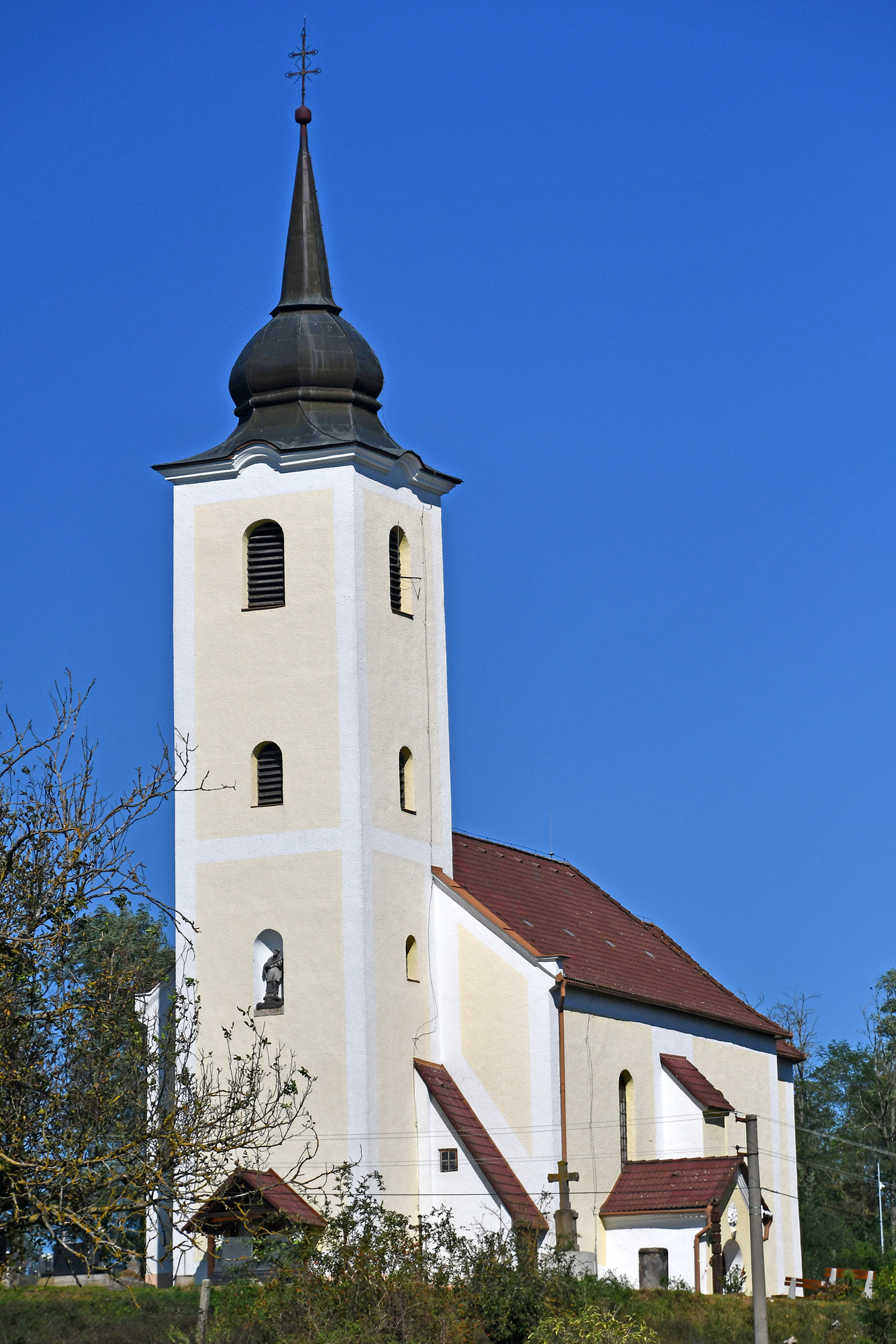
- Roman Catholic church in Slatina

- Flag

- Location of Slatina, Levice District in the Nitra Region Location of Slatina, Levice District in Slovakia
- Coordinates: 48.15°N 18.90°E
- Country: Slovakia
- Region: Nitra Region
- District: Levice District
- First mentioned: 1245

Government
  - Mayor: Arpád Bazsó (Hlas)

Area
  - Total: 9.51 km^{2} (3.67 sq mi)
- Elevation: 145 m (476 ft)

Population (2025)
  - Total: 330
- Time zone: UTC+1 (CET)
  - Summer (DST): UTC+2 (CEST)
- Postal code: 935 83
- Area code: +421 36
- Vehicle registration plate (until 2022): LV
- Website: www.obecslatina.sk

Slatina (Hungarian: Szalatnya) is a village in Slovakia near Levice. The village is known for the Slatina, mineral water extracted here.

First written reference to the village dates from 1245. A spa has existed here since the 18th century.

== Population ==
Population statistic (10 years)
Year	1995	2005	2015	2025
Count	338	360	328	330
Difference		+6.50%	−8.88%	+0.60%

Population statistic
Year	2024	2025
Count	329	330
Difference		+0.30%

It has a population of 330 people (31 December 2025).

=== Ethnicity ===
Census 2021 (1+ %)
Ethnicity	Number	Fraction
Slovak	189	60.57%
Hungarian	118	37.82%
Not found out	26	8.33%
Total	312	

In year 2021 was 312 people by ethnicity 189 as Slovak, 118 as Hungarian, 26 as Not found out, 2 as Romani, 2 as Other and 1 as Czech.

Note on population: The difference values of population numbers in the table "Population statistic" and in the sections "Ethnicity" & "Religion" is caused by the use of various statistical methods.

=== Religion ===
Census 2021 (1+ %)
Religion	Number	Fraction
Roman Catholic Church	246	78.85%
None	33	10.58%
Not found out	24	7.69%
Evangelical Church	4	1.28%
Total	312	

In year 2021 was 312 people by religion 246 from Roman Catholic Church, 33 from None, 24 from Not found out, 4 from Evangelical Church, 2 from Islam, 1 from Calvinist Church, 1 from Jehovah's Witnesses and 1 from Greek Catholic Church.
