= Hasići, Glamoč =

Hasići
- Village
- Location within Bosnia and Herzegovina
- Coordinates: 44.0517°N 16.8433°E
- Country: Bosnia and Herzegovina
- Entity: Federation of Bosnia and Herzegovina
- Canton: Canton 10
- Municipality: Glamoč

Area
  - Total: 2.58 km^{2} (1.00 sq mi)

Population (2013)
  - Total: 241
  - Density: 93.4/km^{2} (242/sq mi)
- Time zone: UTC+1 (CET)
  - Summer (DST): UTC+2 (CEST)

Hasići is a village in the Municipality of Glamoč in Canton 10 of the Federation of Bosnia and Herzegovina, an entity of Bosnia and Herzegovina.

== Demographics ==
According to the 2013 census, its population was 241.

Ethnicity in 2013
Ethnicity	Number	Percentage
Serbs	136	56.4%
Bosniaks	53	22.0%
Croats	52	21.6%
Total	241	100%

== Bibliography ==
- Ethnicity/National Affiliation, Religion and Mother Tongue (PDF). Sarajevo: Agency for Statistics of Bosnia and Herzegovina. 2019.
