= Donja Slatina, Ribnik =

Donja Slatina Доња Слатина
- Village
- Location within Bosnia and Herzegovina
- Coordinates: 44°24′02″N 16°51′16″E
- Country: Bosnia and Herzegovina
- Entity: Republika Srpska
- Municipality: Ribnik
- Time zone: UTC+1 (CET)
  - Summer (DST): UTC+2 (CEST)

Donja Slatina (Serbian Cyrillic: Доња Слатина) is a village in the municipality of Ribnik, Republika Srpska, Bosnia and Herzegovina.
