= Dubočani, Konjic =

Dubočani
- Village
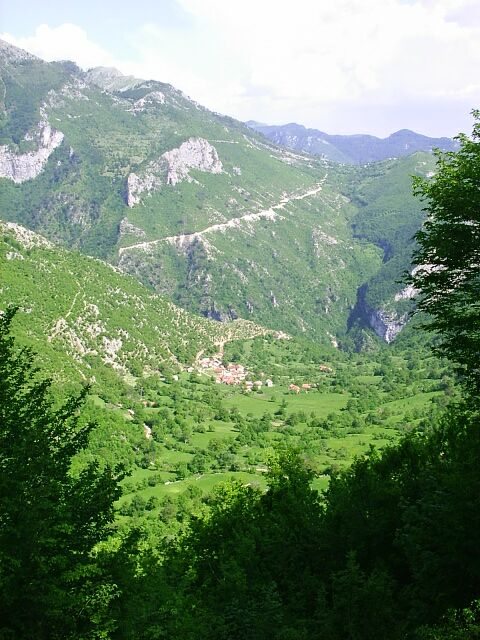

- Location within Bosnia and Herzegovina
- Coordinates: 43°35′06″N 18°04′28″E
- Country: Bosnia and Herzegovina
- Entity: Federation of Bosnia and Herzegovina
- Canton: Herzegovina-Neretva
- Municipality: Konjic

Area
  - Total: 5.40 sq mi (13.99 km^{2})

Population (2013)
  - Total: 54
  - Density: 10/sq mi (3.9/km^{2})
- Time zone: UTC+1 (CET)
  - Summer (DST): UTC+2 (CEST)

Dubočani is a village in the municipality of Konjic, Bosnia and Herzegovina.

== Demographics ==
According to the 2013 census, its population was 54, all Bosniaks.
