= Slatina nad Zdobnicí =

- Municipality
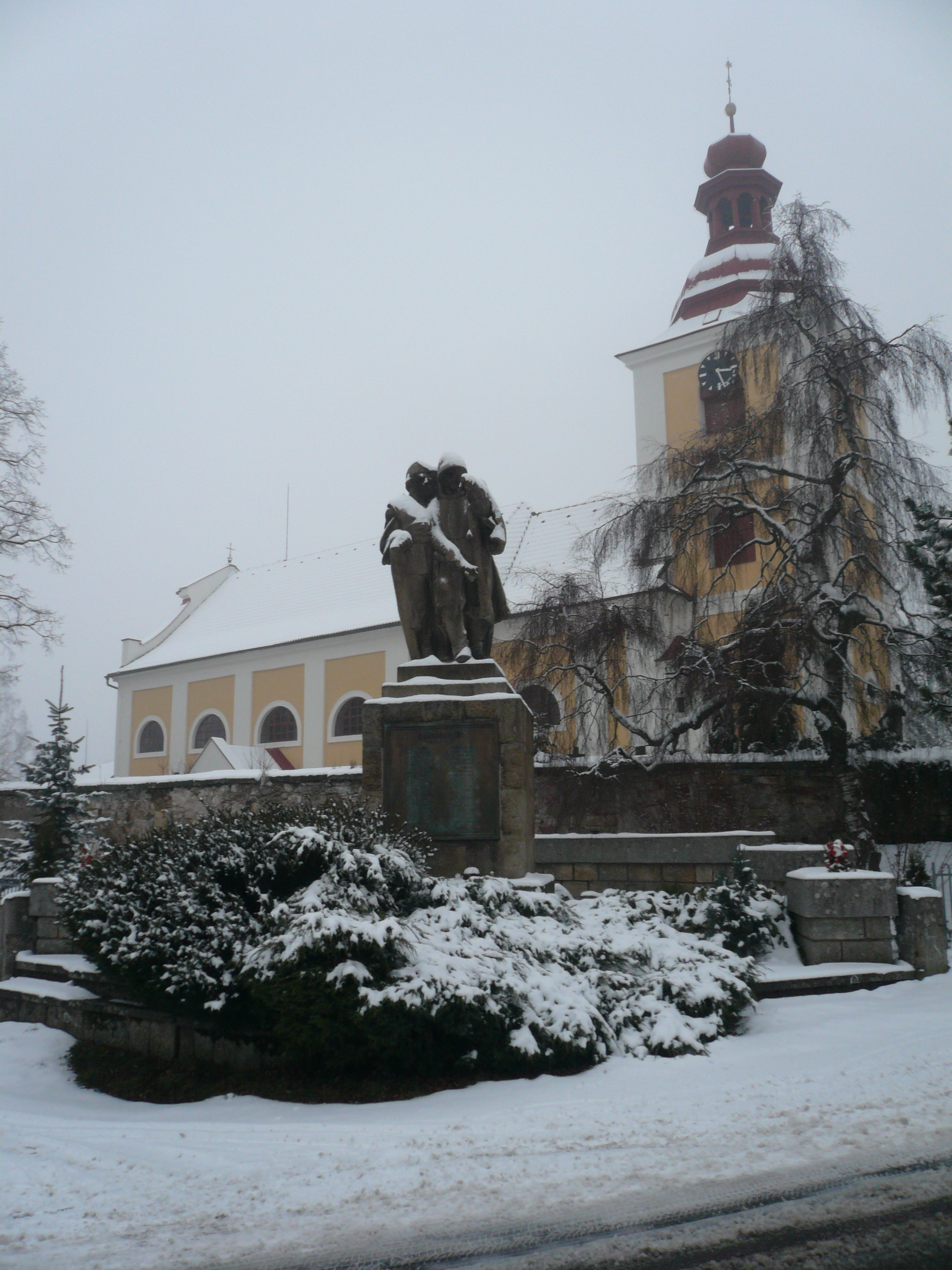
- Church of the Transfiguration of Jesus

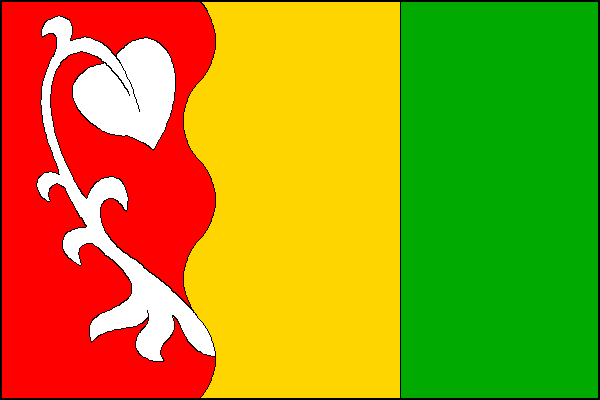
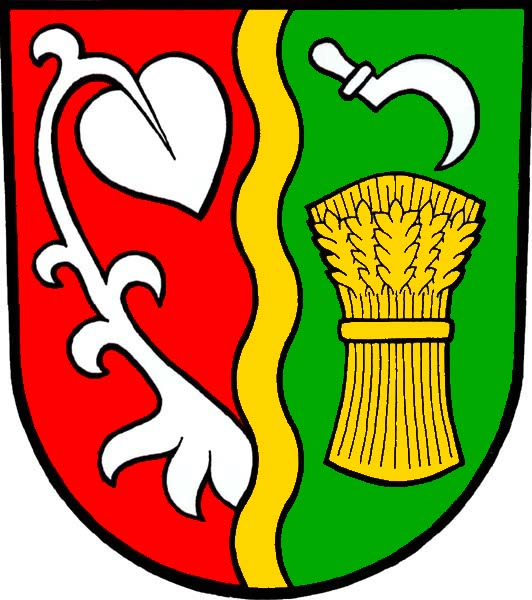
- Flag Coat of arms

- Location in the Czech Republic
- Coordinates: 50°8′2″N 16°23′53″E
- Country: Czech Republic
- Region: Hradec Králové
- District: Rychnov nad Kněžnou
- First mentioned: 1359

Area
  - Total: 16.31 km^{2} (6.30 sq mi)
- Elevation: 420 m (1,380 ft)

Population (2026-01-01)
  - Total: 871
  - Density: 53.4/km^{2} (138/sq mi)
- Time zone: UTC+1 (CET)
  - Summer (DST): UTC+2 (CEST)
- Postal code: 517 56
- Website: www.slatinanz.cz

Slatina nad Zdobnicí is a municipality and village in Rychnov nad Kněžnou District in the Hradec Králové Region of the Czech Republic. It has about 900 inhabitants.

== Demographics ==
Historical population
Year	Pop.	±%
1869	1,248	—
1880	1,249	+0.1%
1890	1,246	−0.2%
1900	1,186	−4.8%
1910	1,147	−3.3%
1921	1,109	−3.3%
1930	1,034	−6.8%
1950	844	−18.4%
1961	846	+0.2%
1970	790	−6.6%
1980	780	−1.3%
1991	823	+5.5%
2001	797	−3.2%
2011	836	+4.9%
2021	846	+1.2%
Source: Censuses
