= Horní Slatina =

- Municipality
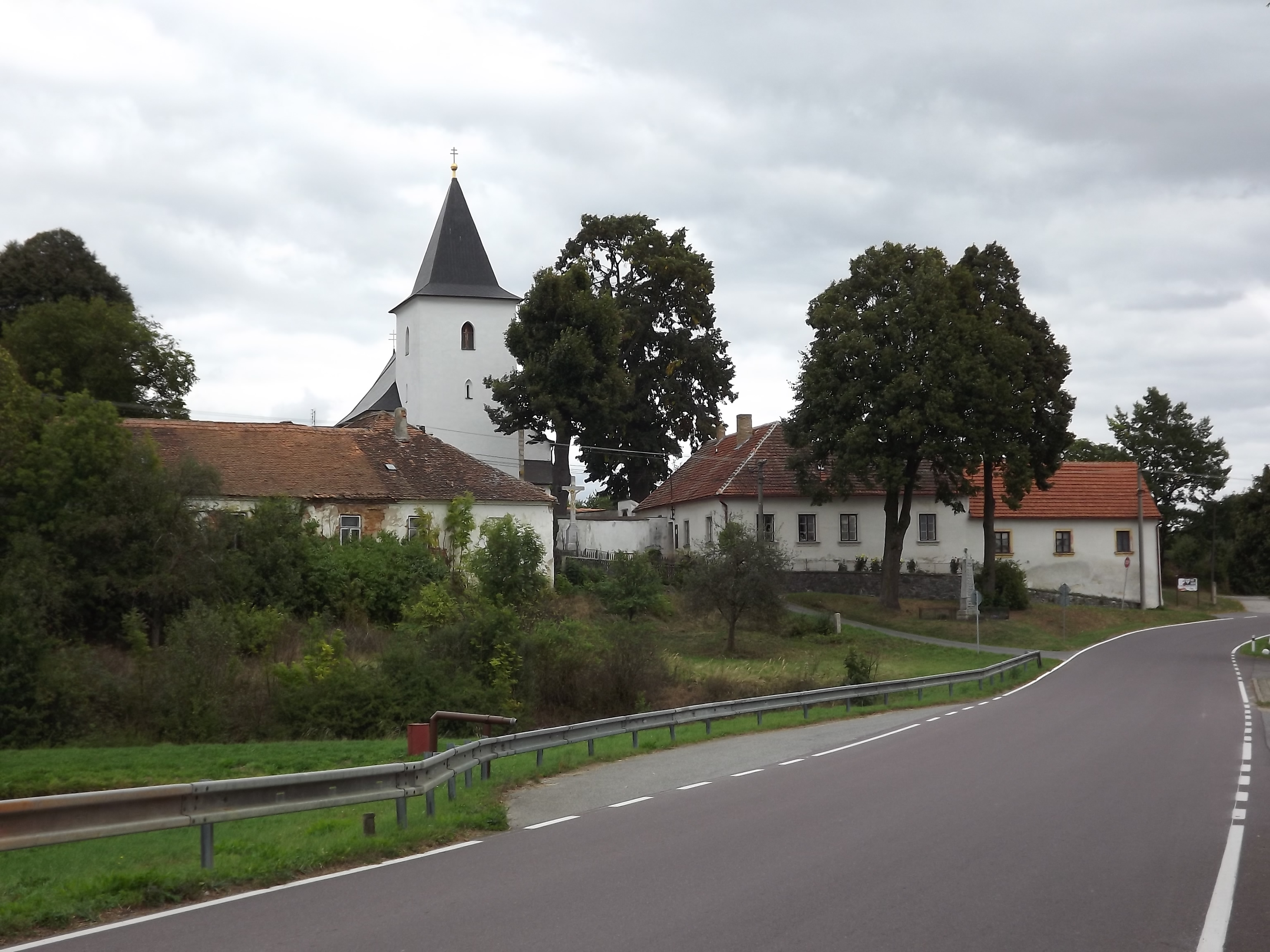
- Church of Saint Giles

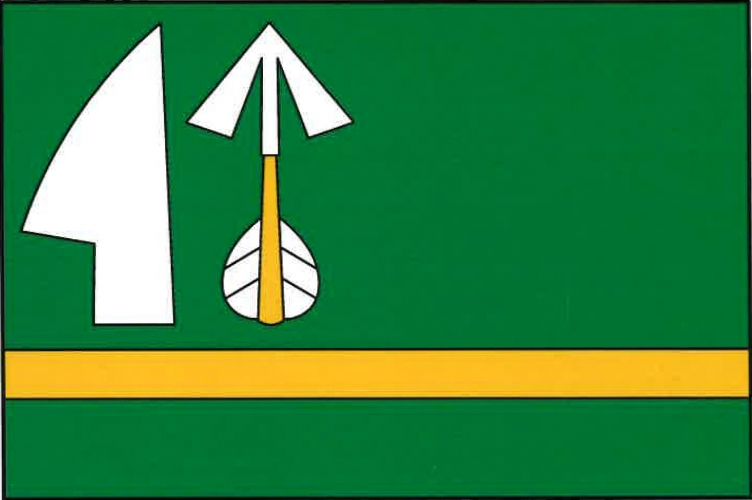
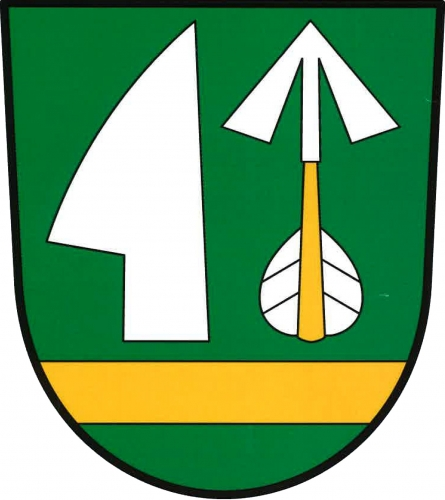
- Flag Coat of arms

- Location in the Czech Republic
- Coordinates: 49°5′48″N 15°33′34″E
- Country: Czech Republic
- Region: South Bohemian
- District: Jindřichův Hradec
- First mentioned: 1278

Area
  - Total: 5.84 km^{2} (2.25 sq mi)
- Elevation: 507 m (1,663 ft)

Population (2026-01-01)
  - Total: 132
  - Density: 22.6/km^{2} (58.5/sq mi)
- Time zone: UTC+1 (CET)
  - Summer (DST): UTC+2 (CEST)
- Postal code: 380 01
- Website: www.hornislatina.cz

Horní Slatina is a municipality and village in Jindřichův Hradec District in the South Bohemian Region of the Czech Republic. It has about 100 inhabitants.

Horní Slatina lies approximately 42 kilometres (26 mi) east of Jindřichův Hradec, 81 km (50 mi) east of České Budějovice, and 138 km (86 mi) south-east of Prague.

== Demographics ==
Historical population
Year	Pop.	±%
1869	305	—
1880	316	+3.6%
1890	291	−7.9%
1900	301	+3.4%
1910	306	+1.7%
1921	289	−5.6%
1930	294	+1.7%
1950	244	−17.0%
1961	225	−7.8%
1970	200	−11.1%
1980	187	−6.5%
1991	178	−4.8%
2001	144	−19.1%
2011	152	+5.6%
2021	134	−11.8%
Source: Censuses
