= Ribnik, Bosnia and Herzegovina =

Municipality in Bosnia and Herzegovina

Ribnik Рибник
- Municipality
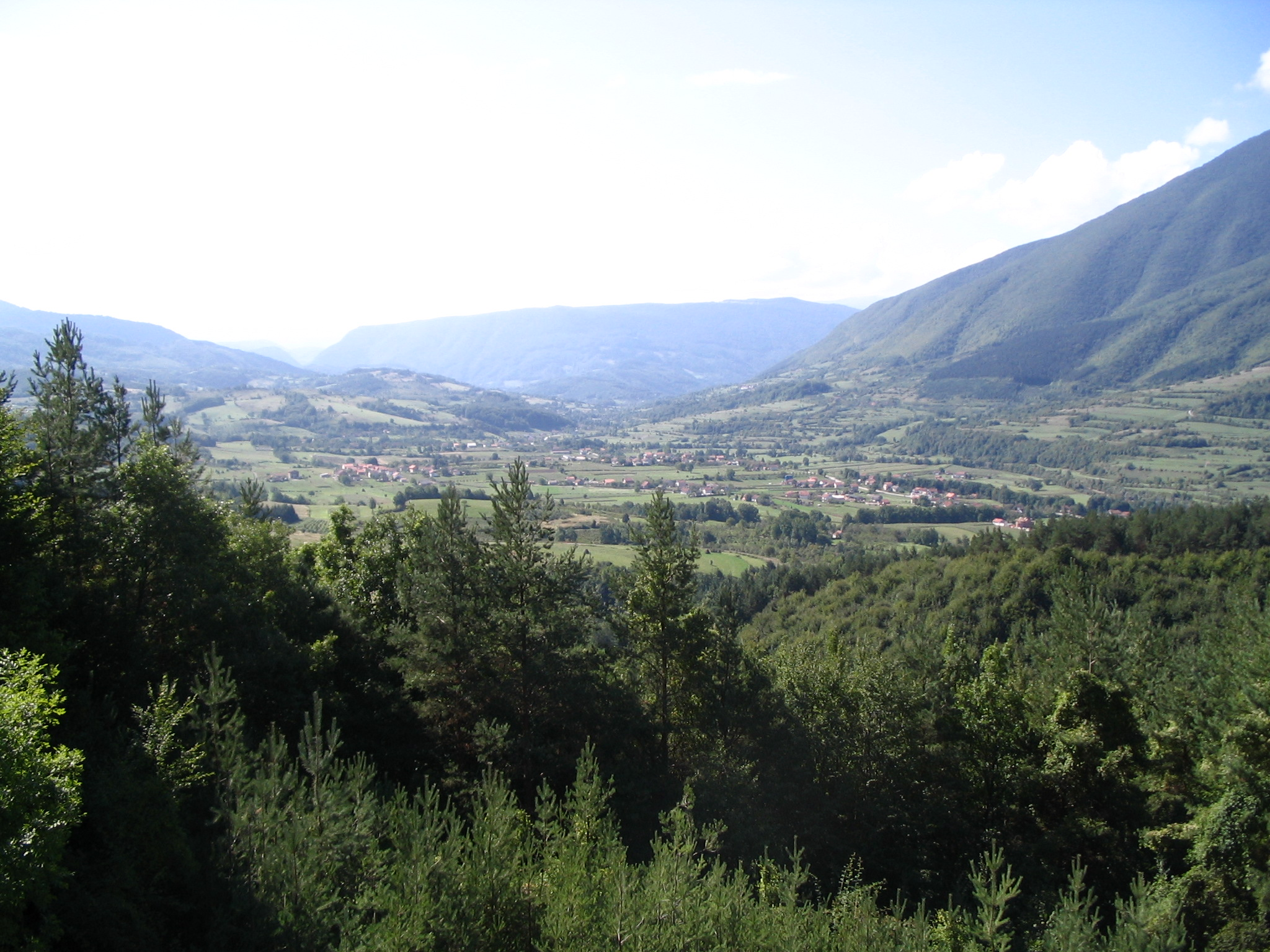
- Ribnik

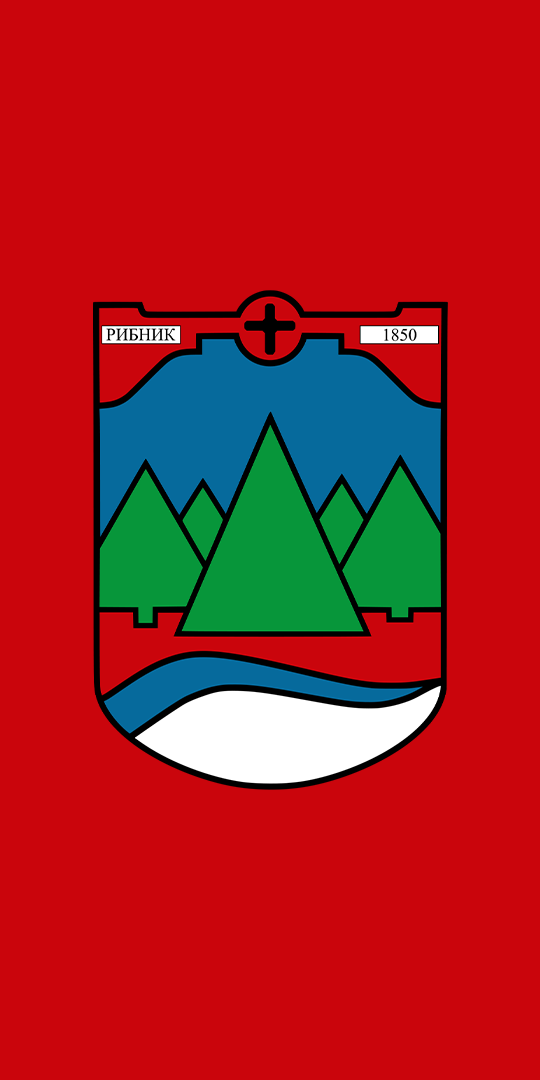
- Flag Coat of arms

- Location of Ribnik, Republika Srpska within Bosnia and Herzegovina

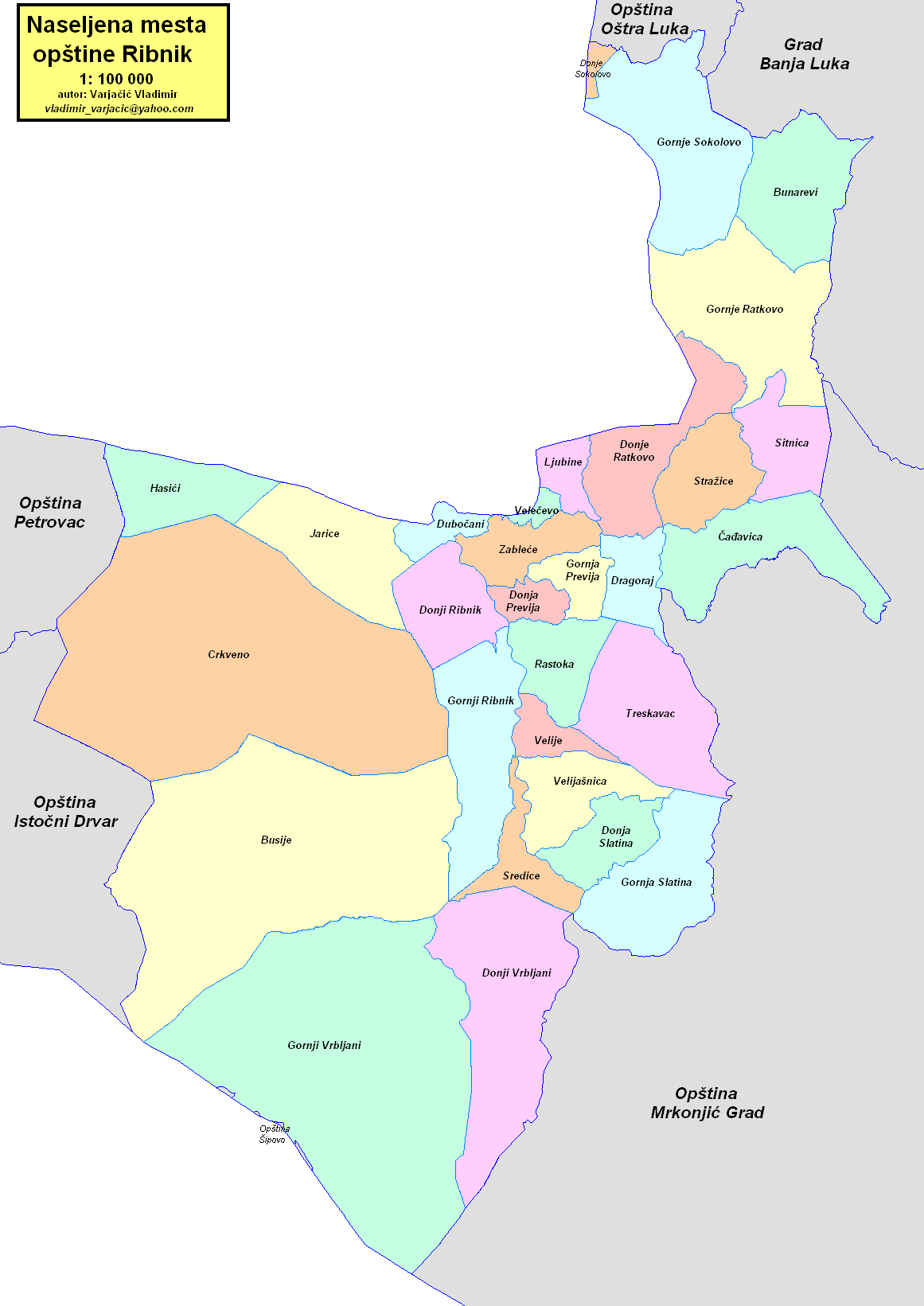
- Coordinates: 44°27′N 16°49′E
- Country: Bosnia and Herzegovina
- Entity: Republika Srpska
- Geographical region: Bosanska Krajina

Government
  - Municipal mayor: Duško Dakić (SNSD)

Area
  - Total: 511.1 km^{2} (197.3 sq mi)

Population (2013 census)
  - Total: 6,048
  - Density: 11.83/km^{2} (30.65/sq mi)
- Time zone: UTC+1 (CET)
  - Summer (DST): UTC+2 (CEST)
- Area code: 50
- Website: opstinaribnik.org

Ribnik (Serbian Cyrillic: Рибник) is a municipality in Republika Srpska, Bosnia and Herzegovina. It is situated in the southern part of the Bosanska Krajina region. As of 2013, it has a population of 6,048 inhabitants. Seat of the municipality is the village of Gornji Ribnik.

Ribnik, briefly known as Srpski Ključ (Српски Кључ), was created from part of the pre-war municipality of Ključ (the other part of the pre-war municipality is now in the Federation of Bosnia and Herzegovina).

== Geography ==
It is located between municipalities of Oštra Luka in the north, Banja Luka and Mrkonjić Grad in the east, Glamoč in the south, and Istočni Drvar, Bosanski Petrovac, and Ključ in the west.

== Demographics ==
According to the 2013 census results, the municipality of Ribnik has 6,048 inhabitants. The majority of its population are ethnic Serbs.

=== Population ===
Population of settlements – Ribnik municipality
	Settlement	1991.	2013.
	Total		6,048
1	Čađavica	561	401
2	Donja Previja	386	404
3	Donji Ribnik	465	395
4	Donji Vrbljani	896	385
5	Gornje Ratkovo		220
6	Gornji Ribnik	696	674
7	Gornji Vrbljani	755	436
8	Rastoka	778	700
9	Velijašnica	288	210
10	Zableće	481	567

=== Ethnic composition ===
Ethnic composition – Ribnik municipality
	2013.
Total	6,048 (100,0%)
Serbs	6,018 (99,50%)
Others	19 (0,314%)
Croats	11 (0,182%)

== Education ==
There are three elementary and one high school in the municipality.

== Gallery ==
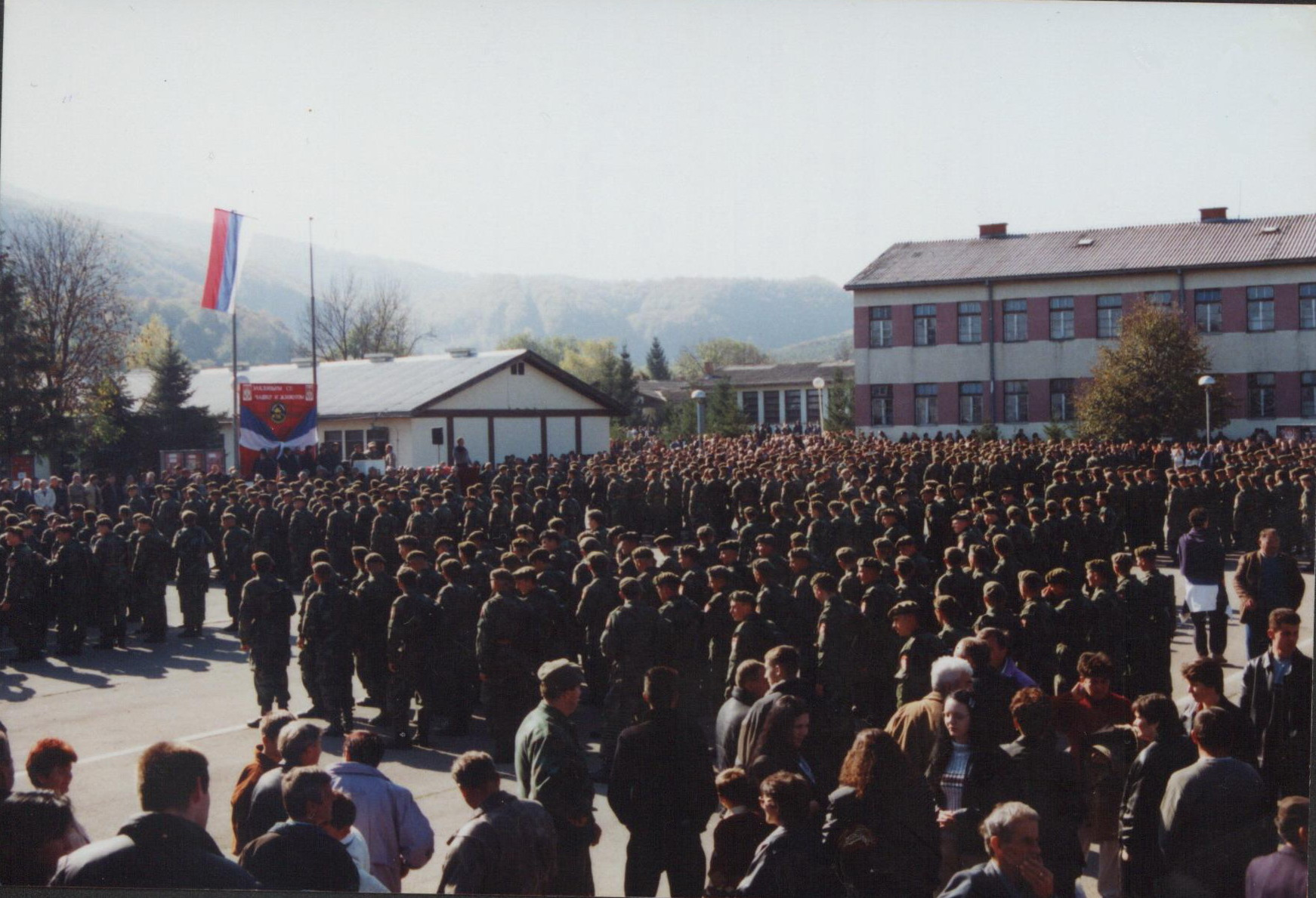
Oath-taking Ceremony in 2001 at the Manjača Military Range

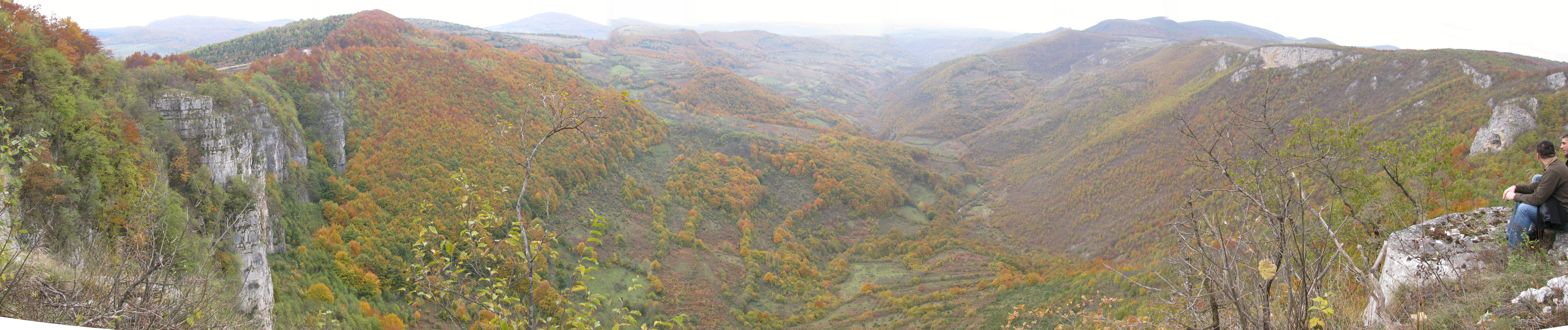
Banjica

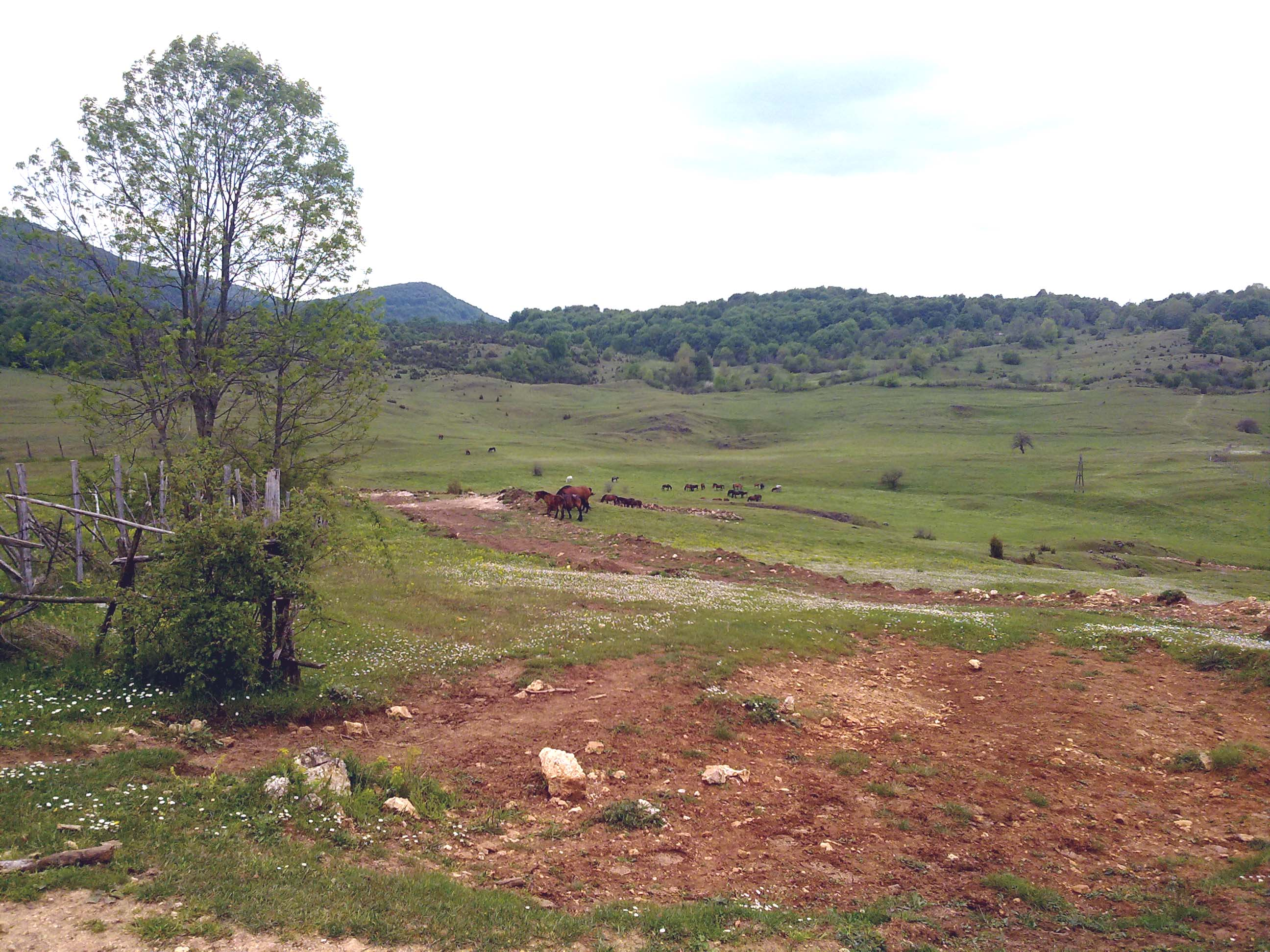
Sokolovo

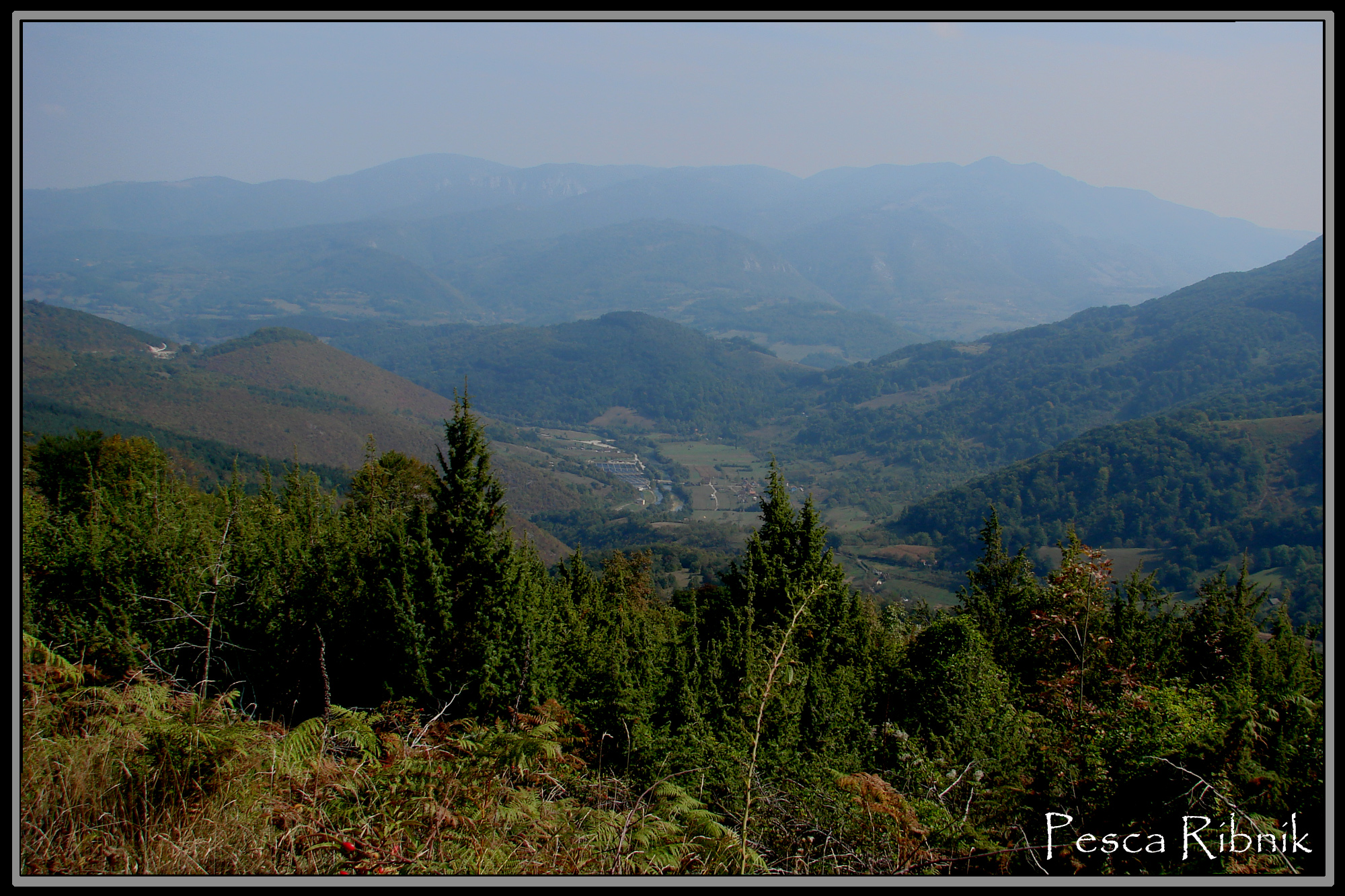
Busije

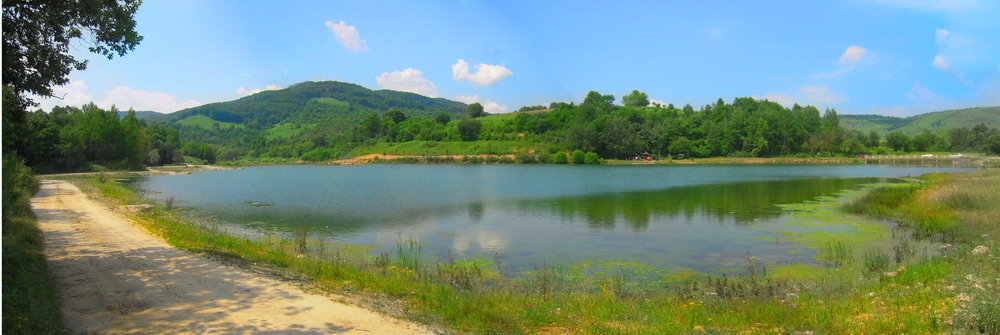
Manjača lake

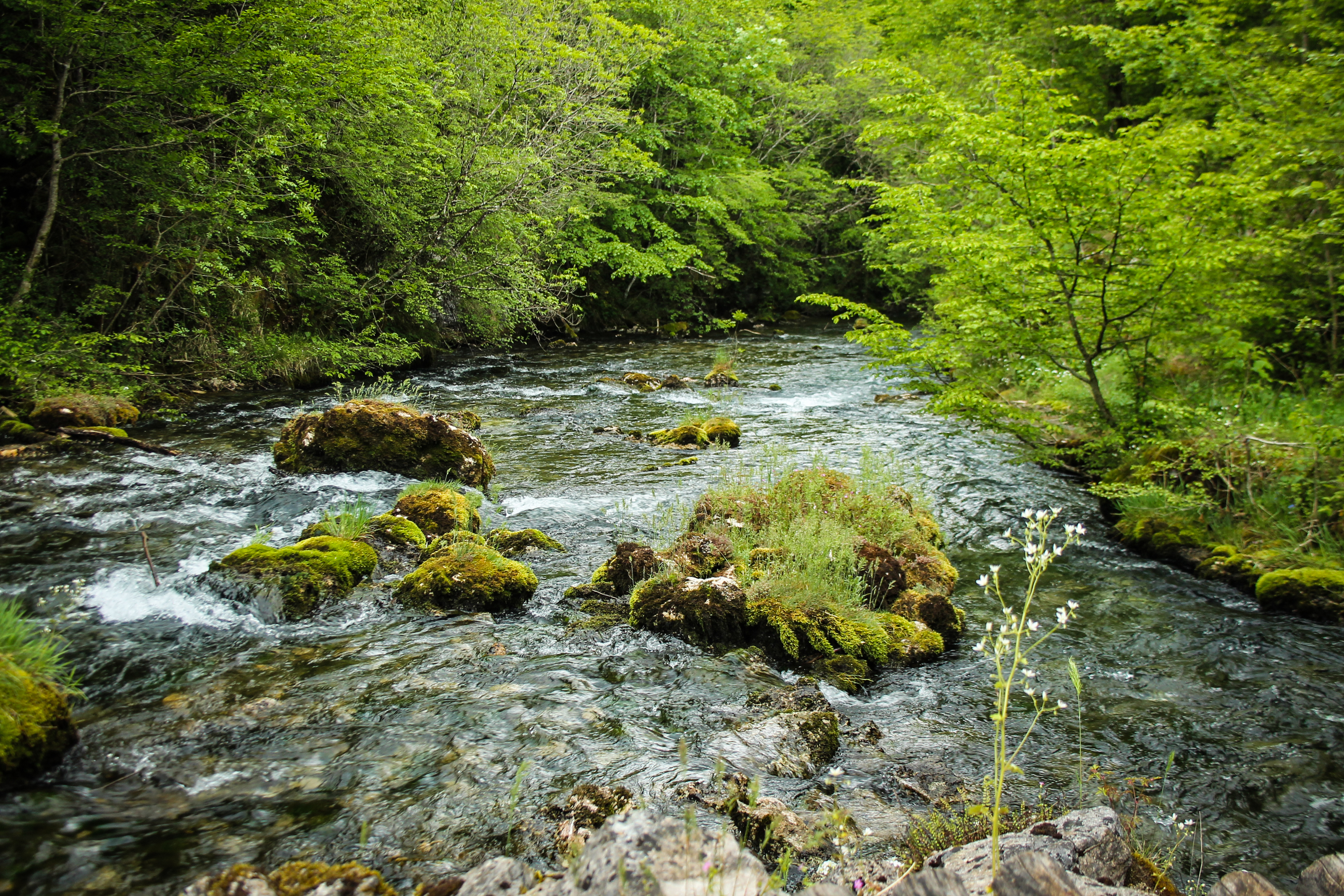
Sana river

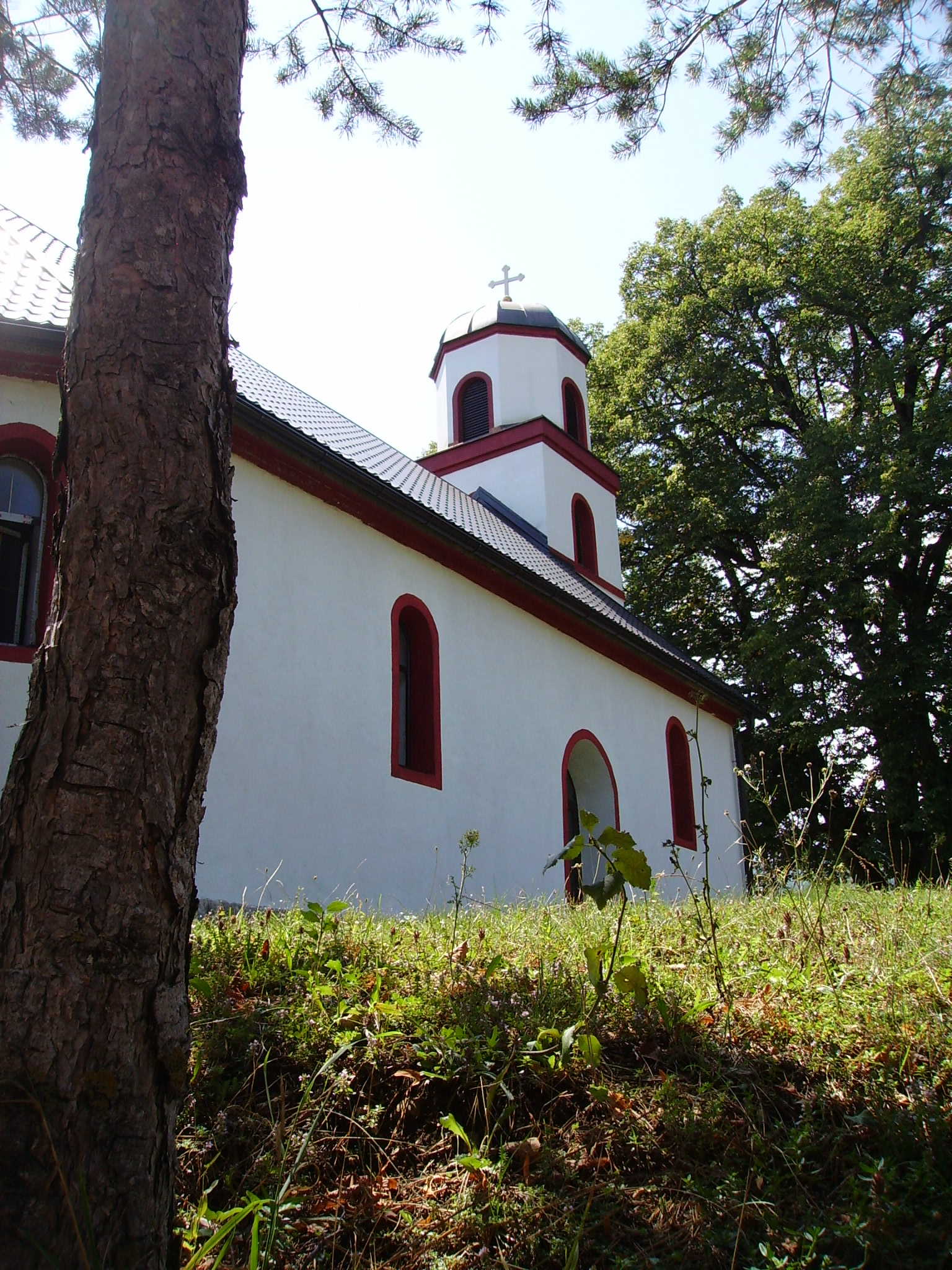
Serbian Orthodox church in Donji Vrbljani

== See also ==
- Municipalities of Republika Srpska
