= Ribnik (river) =

River in Bosnia and Herzegovina

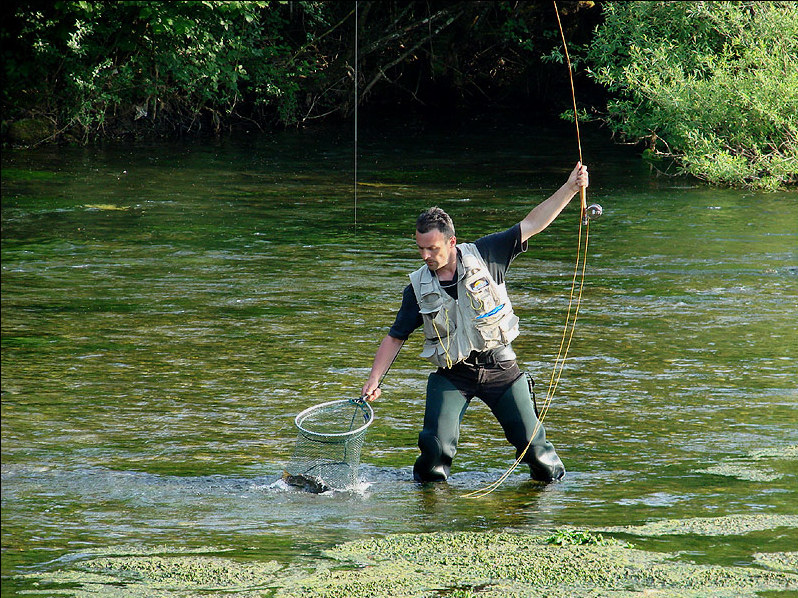
- Fly fishing on the Ribnik river.

- Location of the Ribnik's confluence with the Sana

Location
- Country: Bosnia and Herzegovina
- Municipality: Ribnik (Western Bosnia and Herzegovina)

Physical characteristics
- Source
  - location: Solići hamlet, Gornji Ribnik village
  - coordinates: 44.4023133°N 16.8004856°E
  - elevation: 300 m (980 ft)
- 2nd source
  - location: Solići hamlet, Gornji Ribnik village
  - coordinates: 44.4037255°N 16.7977658°E
- 3rd source
  - location: Solići hamlet, Gornji Ribnik village
  - coordinates: 44.4032963°N 16.7981467°E
- Mouth: Sana river
  - location: Velije hamlet, Gornji Ribnik village
  - coordinates: 44.434454°N 16.8257868°E
- Length: 5.5 km (3.4 mi)
- Basin size: 447 km^{2} (173 sq mi)
- Width
  - average: 30 m (98 ft)
- Depth
  - average: 0.5 m (1.6 ft)
- Discharge
  - location: at the springs
  - average: 15,5 m3/s
  - minimum: 1,25 m3/s
  - maximum: ≥100 m3/s

Basin features
- Progression: Sana→ Una→ Sava→ Danube→ Black Sea
- River system: Una

The Ribnik (Cyrillic: Рибник, pronounced [Rib-nik]) is a river in western Bosnia and Herzegovina. It is a headwater tributary of the Sana, which it meets at Strane and Velije hamlets of the Gornji Ribnik village, 17 km below the Sana's own source springs, bringing in a large amounts of water to the still young Sana. It is among shortest of the Sana tributaries but at the same time among largest by the volume it discharges into the receiving Sana. The Ribnik is well known as a prime fly fishing fishery and is popular among anglers throughout the world.

== Name ==
The name of the river derives from the Slavic word for fish, riba, from which derives ribnjak or ribnik, a fish pond, a river, or a pool, or a body of water stocked with fish.

== Geography and hydrology ==
The Ribnik river, just like the Sana in its upper course, is classified mountain river with upland freshwater ecology, with its very clear and cold waters, classified as the Class I (or A) purity. Gushing out of the karst plateau with Ovčara as its most prominent summit (1576 m), between the Klekovačan and Vitorog mountains. The springs of both the river Sana and the Ribnik are located in the municipality of Ribnik, in Bosnia and Herzegovina, in the wider area of the villages of Gornji and Donji Vrbljani. The Ribnik basin comprises about 447 square kilometres.

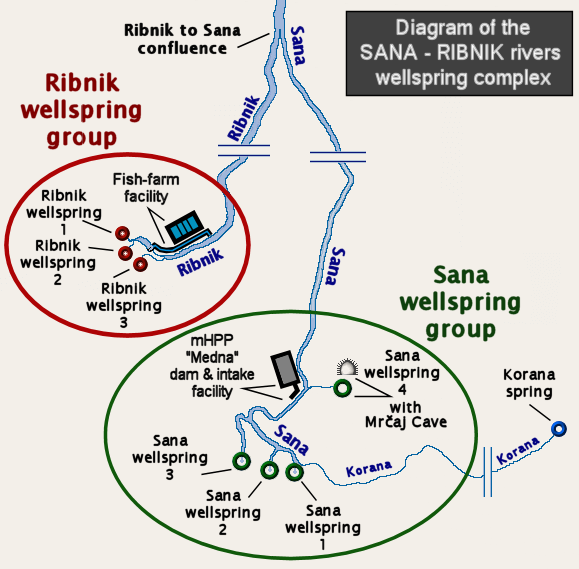
The Ribnik and Sana rivers wellspring-groups complex, with the whole 5.5 km of Ribnik river course and the Sana headwaters (first 17 km).

=== Springs ===
The Ribnik emerges near the small hamlet Solići. The spring group consists of three very strong karstic well-springs from which river-sized flow is immediately formed. The upper group consisting of two springs set the small stream and after about a 500 meters merge with a third and strongest well-spring coming from the right, forming the Ribnik main course.

The sources of the Ribnik River are about 4 km from the village of Ribnik. The Ribnik River is approximately 8 km long and its journey ends at the village of Velije where it flows into the River Sanaa.

The Ribnik springs out below the mountain Srnetica, 4 km above the central hamlet of Gornji Ribnik settlement group. The spring group consists of three springs, two of which are permanent and strong, and one more occasional spring. They appearing at the contact of the Cretaceous limestone and the Lower Triassic clastites. Depending on the season, spring group yield oscillations significantly, with an average discharge Qmid measured at 15,5 m3/s (Qmin = 1,25 m3/s; and Qmax above 100 m3/s). It is broken type and ascending outflow mechanism.

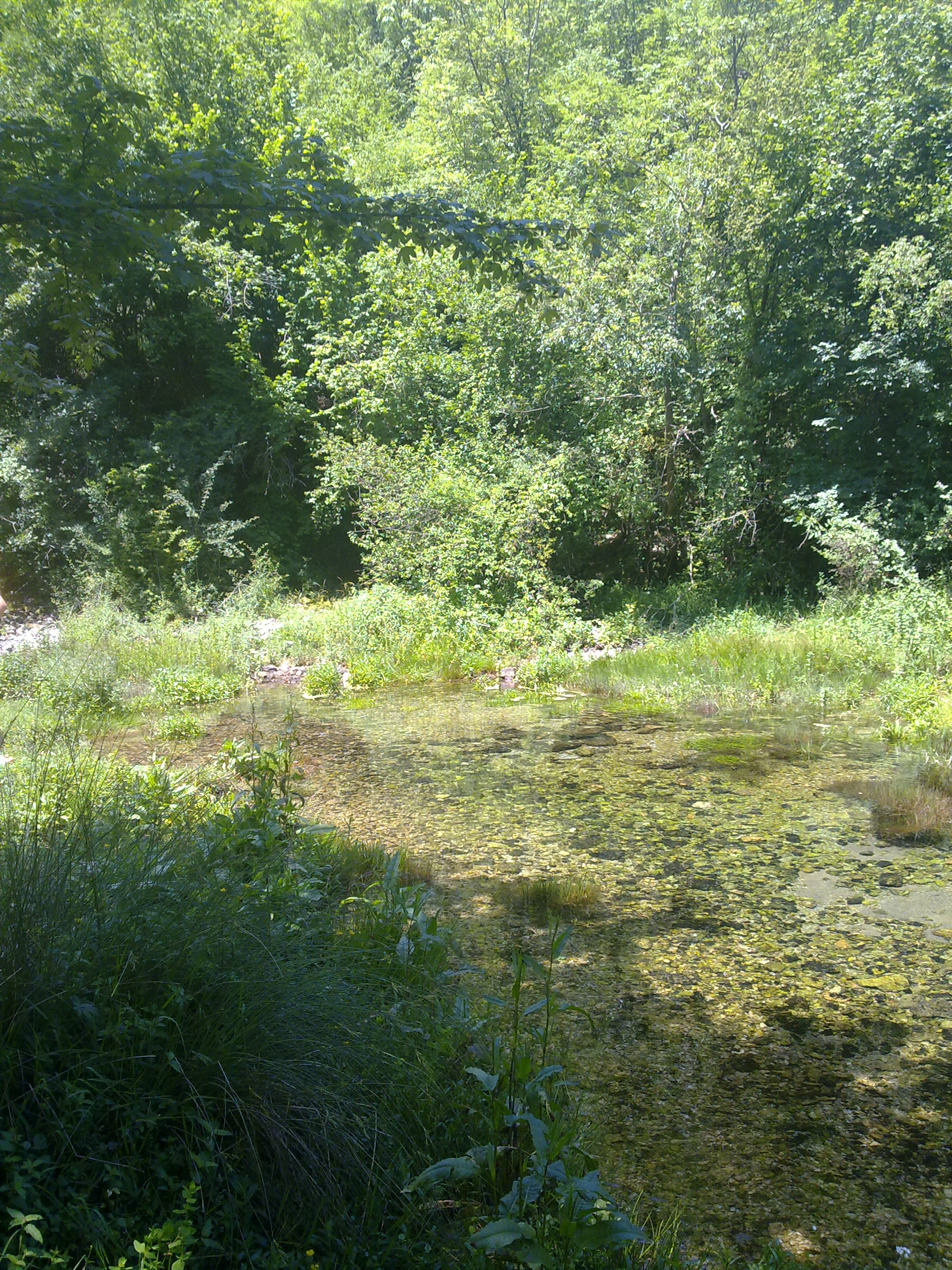
The Ribnik wellspring - one of two in the upper group.

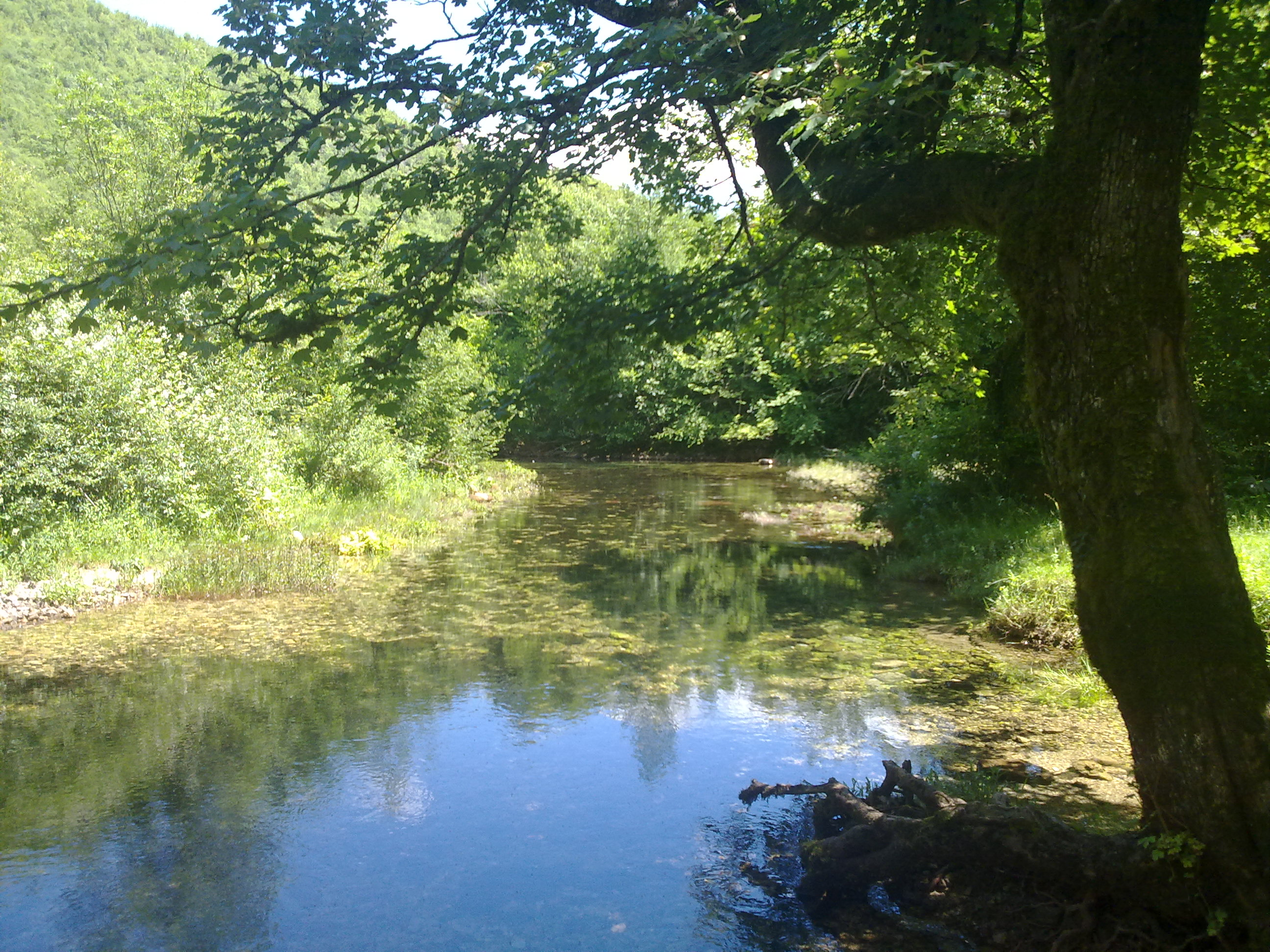
The Ribnik wellsprings - confluence of first two in the upper group.

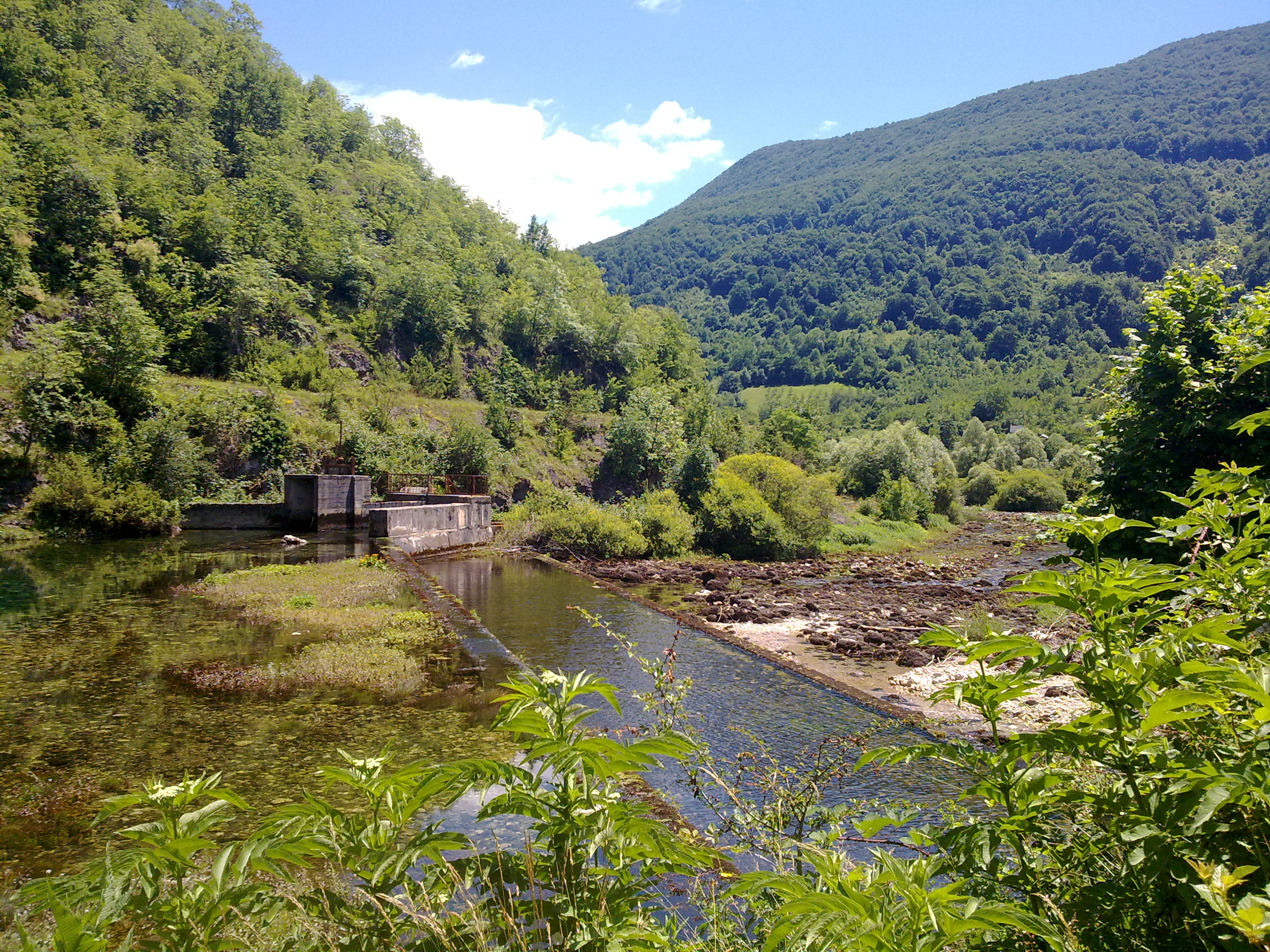
The Ribnik wellspring - the lower, separate one.

=== Course ===
It is a short chalk river, with a course only 5.5 kilometres long. The Ribnik falls into a category of a streams, with a clear and cold waters, however its course has relatively small gradient which contributes to a placid flow with mild rapids.

It is a headwaters tributary of the Sana, which it meets at Donji Ribnik, 17 km below Sana's own spring, bringing large amounts of water to River Sana.

== Tourism and outdoor recreation ==
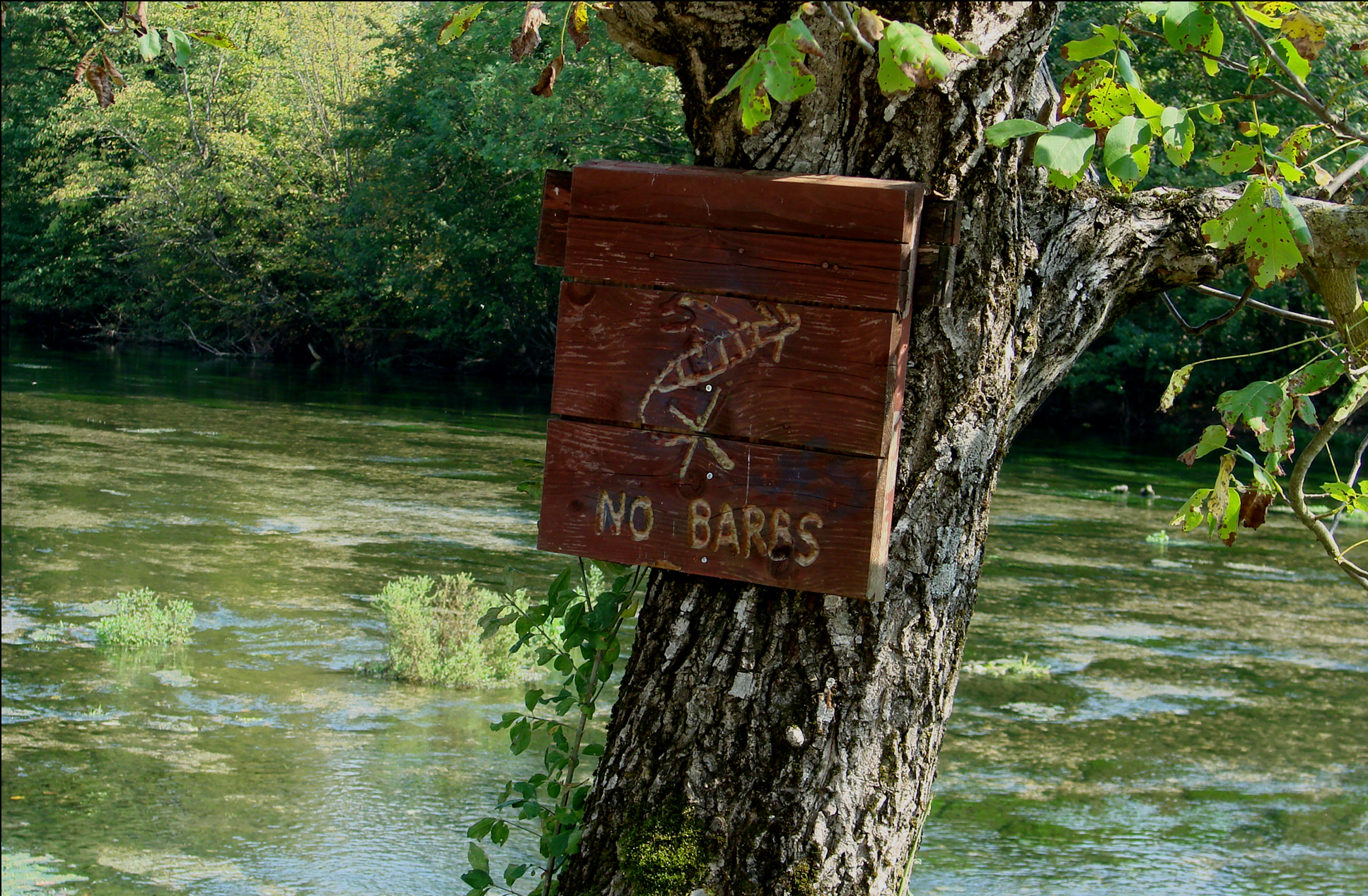
"No Barbs" sign on the Ribnik river.

The river Ribnik, together with the Sana, represents a very important tourist potential. Its waters are rich in salmonoid fish, greyling and brown trout, which is also evidence of river's water quality. The area around the rivers is hilly to mountainous, covered with a lush forests, rich in forest fruits, mushrooms and herbs, with many mountain peaks and lookouts, karstic springs and waterfalls. The preserved natural environment, with unpolluted water and air, offering the opportunity for all kinds of outdoor recreation, walking, hiking, caving, hunting and fly fishing.

=== Fly fishing ===
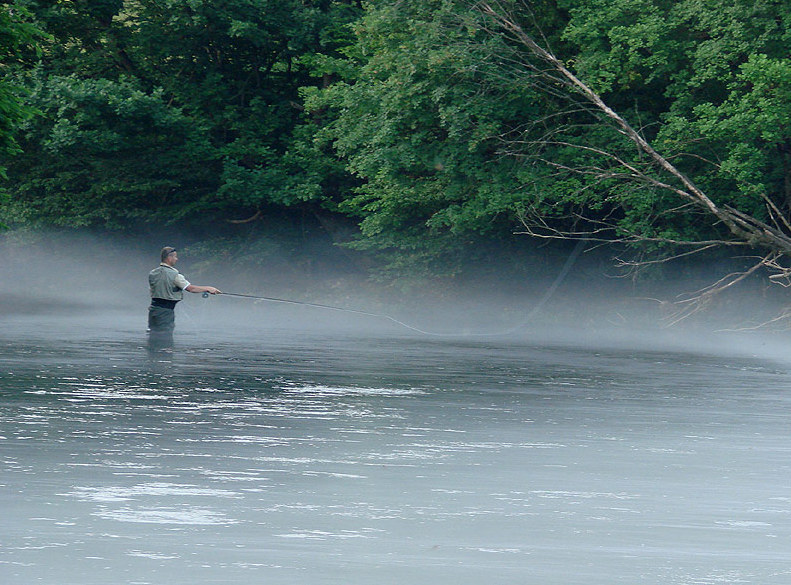
Fly fisherman on the Ribnik river

The Ribnik municipality is known for hunting and fishing, and the fly fishing competitions are held on the river seasonally. The Ribnik is a popular fly fishing destination in Bosnia due to its abundant brown trout stock and trophy-size greyling population.

=== Hunting ===
Hills and mountains in the wider area of the Ribnik are well maintained hunting grounds, with a game feeding grounds. Hunting trails with open and closed type checks, as well as hunting lodges are available. These hunting areas represent a nature reserve used for breeding of wide variety of game, such as bears, wild boars, wolves, foxes, lynx, as well as very rare species of deer and grouse.

=== Hiking and caving ===
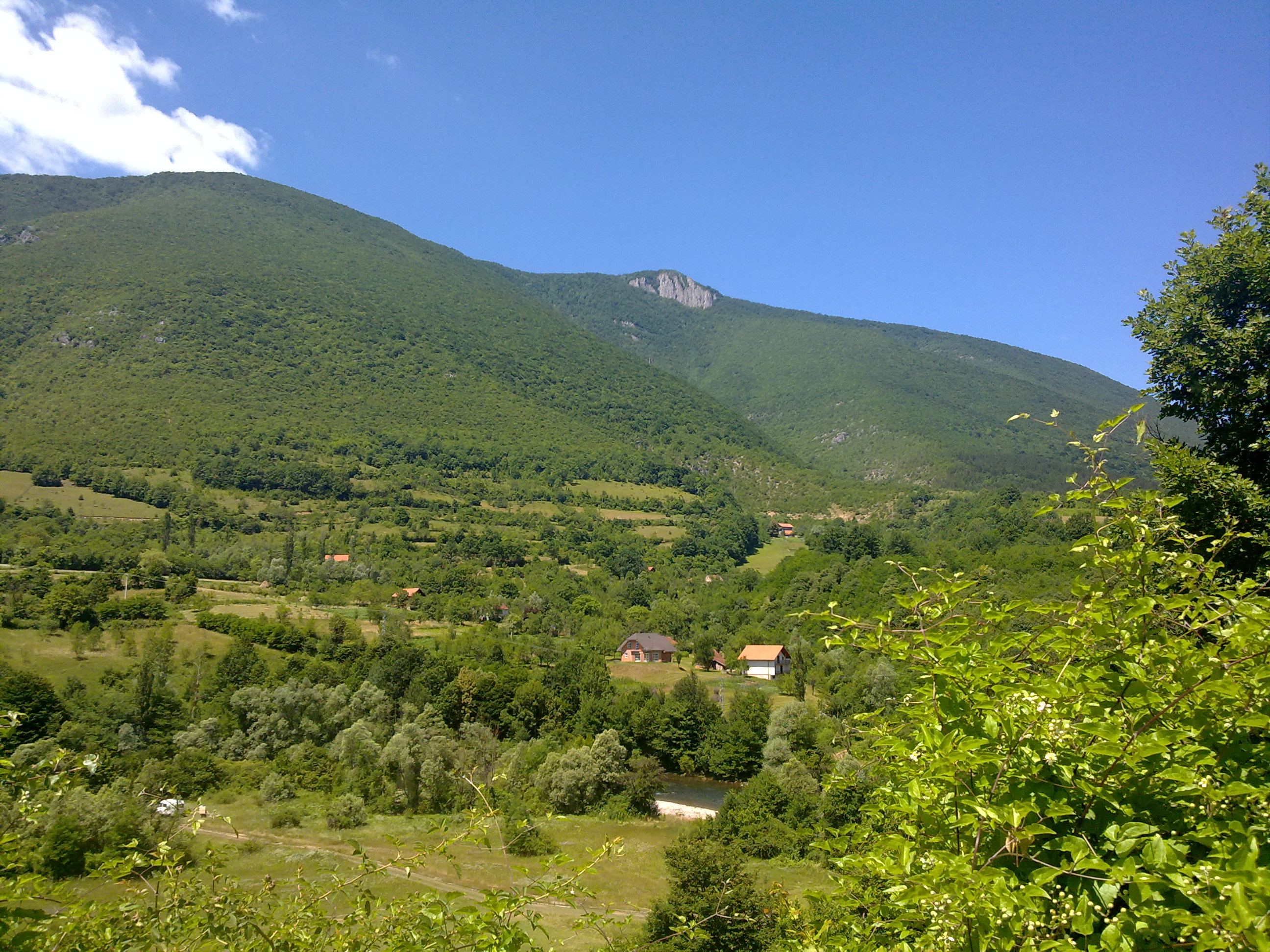
Šiški Kamen rock and a cave, in a pristine nature high above the Ribnik.

Šiša is one of the mountains in this region, adorned with a dense coniferous and deciduous forests, as well as numerous glades with lush meadows. Šiški Kamen (also known as Sokolovača) is a tall limestone cliff, located at the very top of this mountain. At the bottom of the cliff is a small cave. It is one of mountain's prime attractions.

The Ledena pećina (transl. Ice Cave) is located near the village of Vučija Poljana (lit.transl. Wolf's Glade), at an altitude of over 1200 m a.s.l., and is surrounded by lush coniferous forests. The cave has not yet been sufficiently explored. Nevertheless, it represents an interesting speleological phenomenon, with the large amounts of precipitation in the area is being collected in the cave and during the winter months turned into huge blocks of ice due to extreme low temperatures. This phenomenon is the reason behind the cave's name. The amounts of ice and snow collected in the interior of the cave is easily maintained during the summer months by cave's low inner temperature and location high altitude.

=== Ambiance and leisure ===
Nearby arranged picnic areas are open access, as well as the proximity to larger settlement Gornji Ribnik, where the newly built accommodation facilities is on offer, along with other natural and cultural values. Around the source of the Ribnik, 4.5 km of trails are arranged for walking and outdoor recreation.

== See also ==
- Neretva
