= Sana (river) =

River in Bosnia and Herzegovina

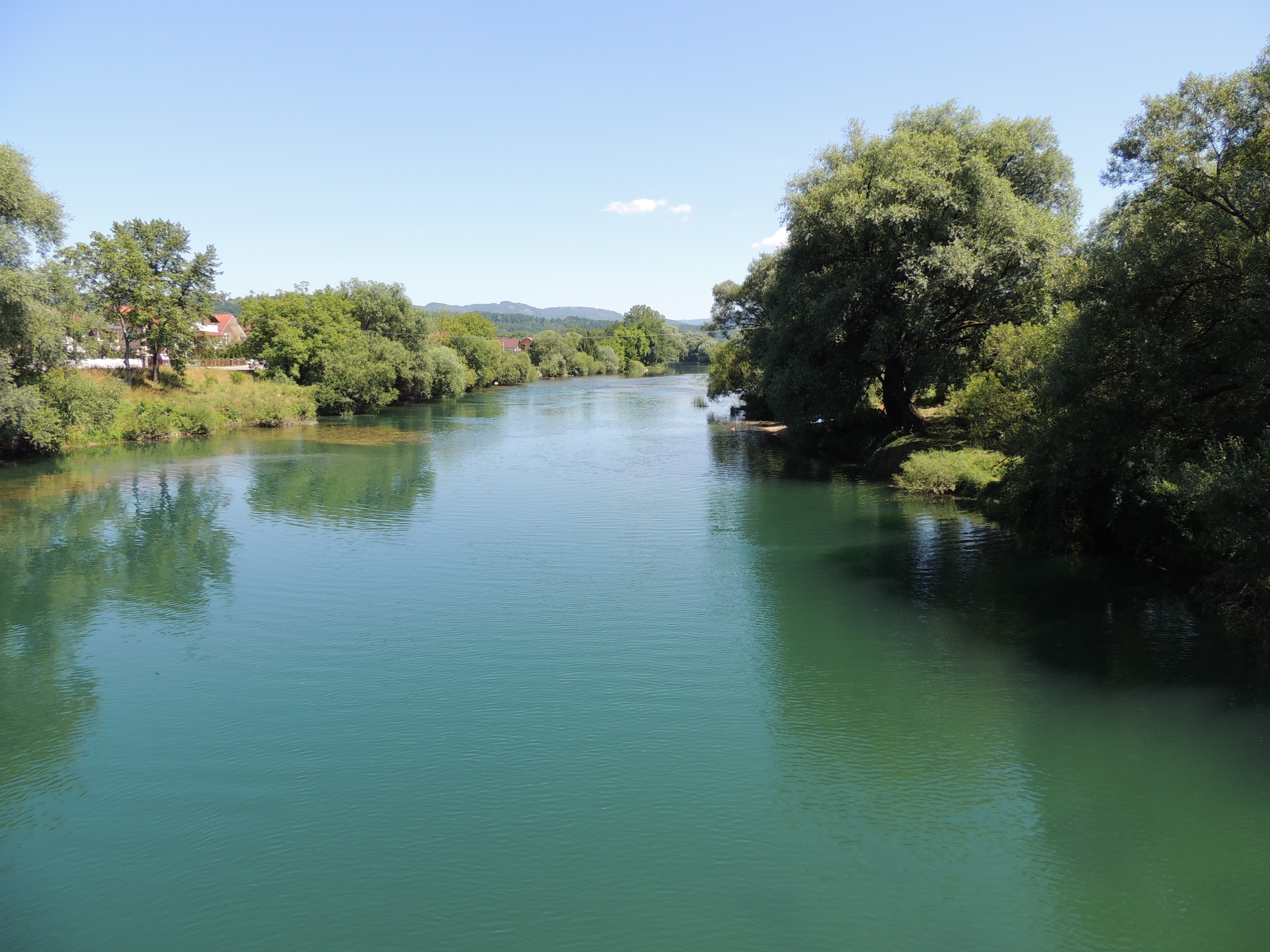
- The Sana river between the municipalities of Oštra Luka and Prijedor.

- Location of the Sana's confluence with the Una

Location
- Country: Bosnia and Herzegovina

Physical characteristics
- Source
  - location: Ribnik, Western Bosnia and Herzegovina
  - coordinates: 44.3173773°N 16.8365586°E
- Mouth
  - location: Una, in Novi Grad, Bosnia and Herzegovina
  - coordinates: 45.051°N 16.383°E
- Length: 141.9 km (88.2 mi)
- Basin size: 4,258 km^{2} (1,644 sq mi)

Basin features
- Progression: Una→ Sava→ Danube→ Black Sea

The Sana (pronounced [sǎːna]) is a river in the north-western part of Bosnia and Herzegovina. It is a tributary of the Una, which it flows into at Novi Grad. It is the longest of the nine rivers that flow through Sanski Most, and is 142 km long. It is not a navigable waterway.

== Name ==
The name of the river derives from the Latin adjective sānus, feminine sāna hence sana, which roughly translates "healthy" (Aqua Sanus translates as healthy water / river).

== Course and sections ==
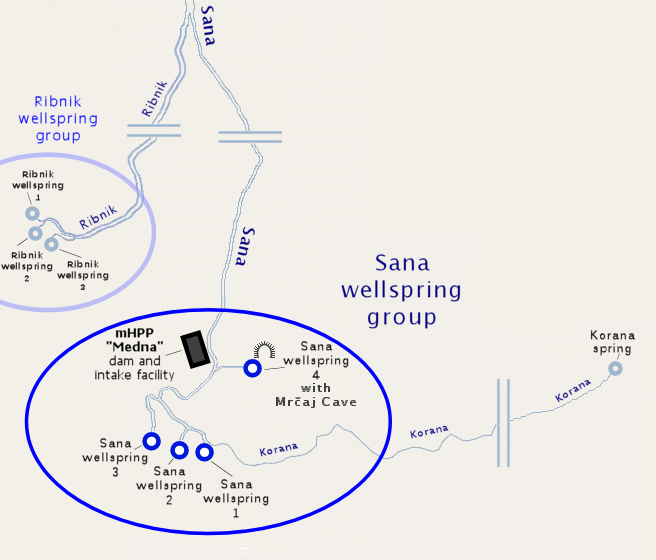
The Sana and Ribnik rivers wellspring groups

=== Springs and Upper Sana ===
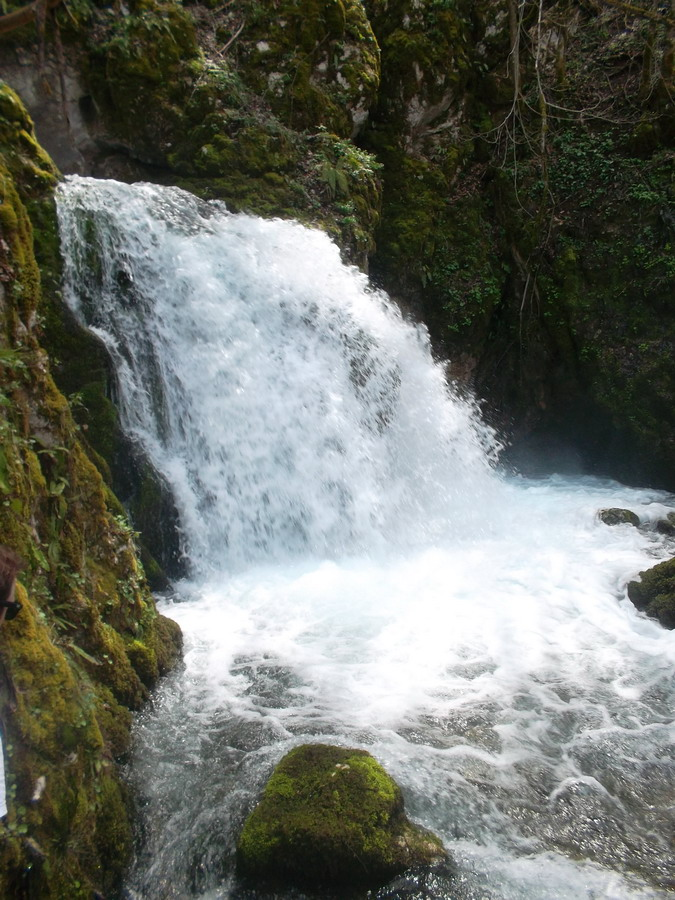
One of three major wellsprings of the Sana

The Sana in its upper course is fast mountain river with upland freshwater ecology, and its waters being very clear and cold. Gushing out of the karst plateau with Ovčara as most prominent summit (1576 m), between Klekovača and Vitorog mountains, and flows toward alluvial plains of the Bosanska Krajina with lowland freshwater ecology. Well-spring areal is located in the vicinity of Marići village, between surrounding villages of Gornja Pečka and Donja Pečka, Gornji Vrbljani and Donji Vrbljani, and Medna, on the territories of Ribnik and Mrkonjić Grad municipality not far from the town of Šipovo. The source itself consists of four major and water abundant karstic well-springs, with relatively high average discharge, and after about hundred meters first three individual wellsprings merge with a main course, which is set by the small stream of Korana coming from the right form direction of Gornja Pečka village, receiving the Sana springs one-by-one, with first three supplementing it from the left and, after just a little more than one kilometre downstream, with the fourth from the right. This fourth well-spring is also known for the Mračaj karstic cave from which it emerges. From this point the Sana is formed river, with steady average discharge.

The river at this point is still with low average discharge, and receiving the waters of several other smaller streams, but after just about 17 km the Sana meet with its first major tributary, the short but water abundant river, the Ribnik. The area surrounding confluence of the two rivers is called Ribnik, and is divided between two settlements, Gornji and Donji Ribnik. From Ribnik, the Sana runs through a valley in a south-to-north-northwestern direction as it reach the historic town of Ključ.

=== Middle course ===
At this point, passing through Ključ, the upper course ends and river enters its midsection narrow gorge, with steep but relatively low slopes, while turning its course to more clear south-to-north direction. The river here combines with the waters of several typical karstic streams, abundant in water but short in length. Its main tributary is water abundant the Sanica river, which flows east-to-west from the direction of Grmeč mountain, and in this section reaches the Sana from the left at Vrhpolje. Soon after, the Sana receives the Kijevska rijeka from the right and the Dabar from the left.

After 72 km and the altitude difference of 262.52 m, the Sana then passes through Sanski Most and combines with two significant tributary rivers, the Zdena and the Bliha river, both from the left, as well as the smaller Majdanuša from the left. From here it runs toward the town of Prijedor, where its middle section ends, and where it receives the waters of Gomjenica river from the right.

=== Lower Sana ===
The Sana then turns sharply under an angle of almost 90 degrees and heads west. Near Blagaj Japra and Blagaj Rijeka, it receives the Japra from the left. In its final destination in Novi Grad, the Sana empties into the Una river as its most important and largest tributary. From Sanski Most, through Prijedor, to its confluence with the Una in Bosanski Novi, the average drop is 41.21 m. Between Prijedor and Novi Grad, the river also serves as a natural border between the two subregions, Potkozarje and Podgrmeč. In this section the Sana is characteristically lowland river.

Before the war in Bosnia and Herzegovina, a paper mill "Celpak" in Prijedor was draining wastewater into the Sana, just downstream from the town, so that the further flow of the river was considered polluted. From the outset of the war, and after the war to this day, the factory has been shut down and the discharge of wastewater is reduced to significantly smaller scale. At the center of Novi Grad the Sana reaches the Una river.

== Environmental concerns ==
Plans to harness hydropower on the Sana have been proposed; a concession was granted to begin a project in 2008 or 2009. The hydroelectric power plant MHE Medna opened in 2018 and was developed by the company Kelag in the upper reaches of the river, just a few kilometres from the Sana's source outlets. The project was protested by local and national NGOs for years, but without success. Opponents raised concerns that the dam would damage the river's flow (river morphology), ambient value, and beauty; and inflict habitat destruction of native fish such as the endangered Huchen (Danube salmon).

== Tourism and recreation ==
Rafting is one of the most popular forms of outdoor recreation in Bosnia and Herzegovina, and the river Sana is popular destination.

The Sana is known for an abundant ichthyofauna, rich in species, and recreational and fly fishing are very popular on entire course of the river. Most important is critically endangered endemic huchen, whose population is maintained healthy in the Sana and its tributary the river Sanica, while the Bliha, Dabar, Zdena, Gomjenica, Kozica, and especially the small river Banjica near Ključ are all important spawning grounds for both, huchen and its prey, common nase (Chondrostoma nasus) and grayling (Thymallus thymallus).

In the Sana's headwaters fly fishing is particularly popular, with the tributary Ribnik being famous throughout the world as a popular fly fishing destination, with a trophy sized greyling being abundant.

== Gallery ==
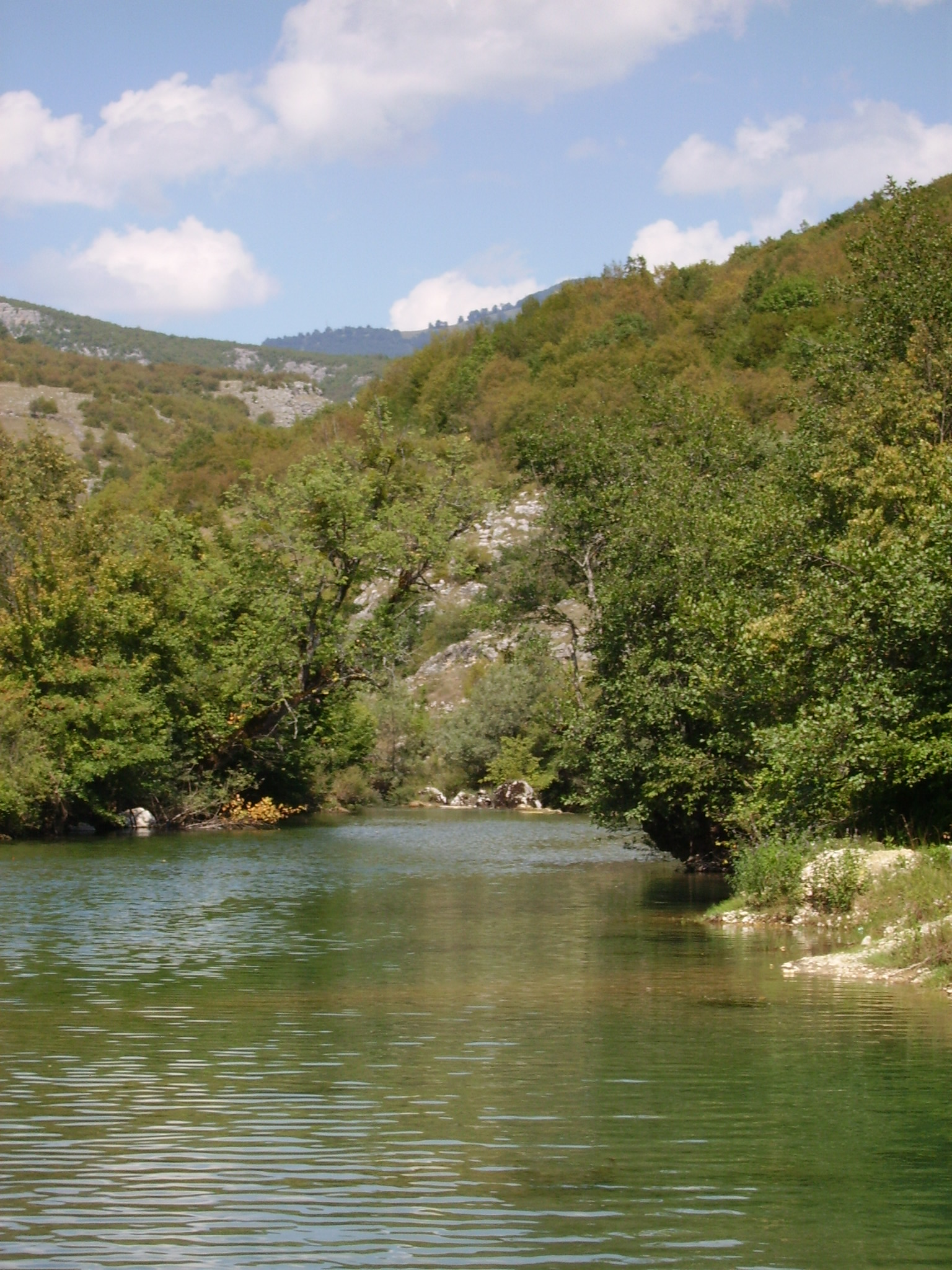
The Sana river near Donji Vrbljani, Bosnia.

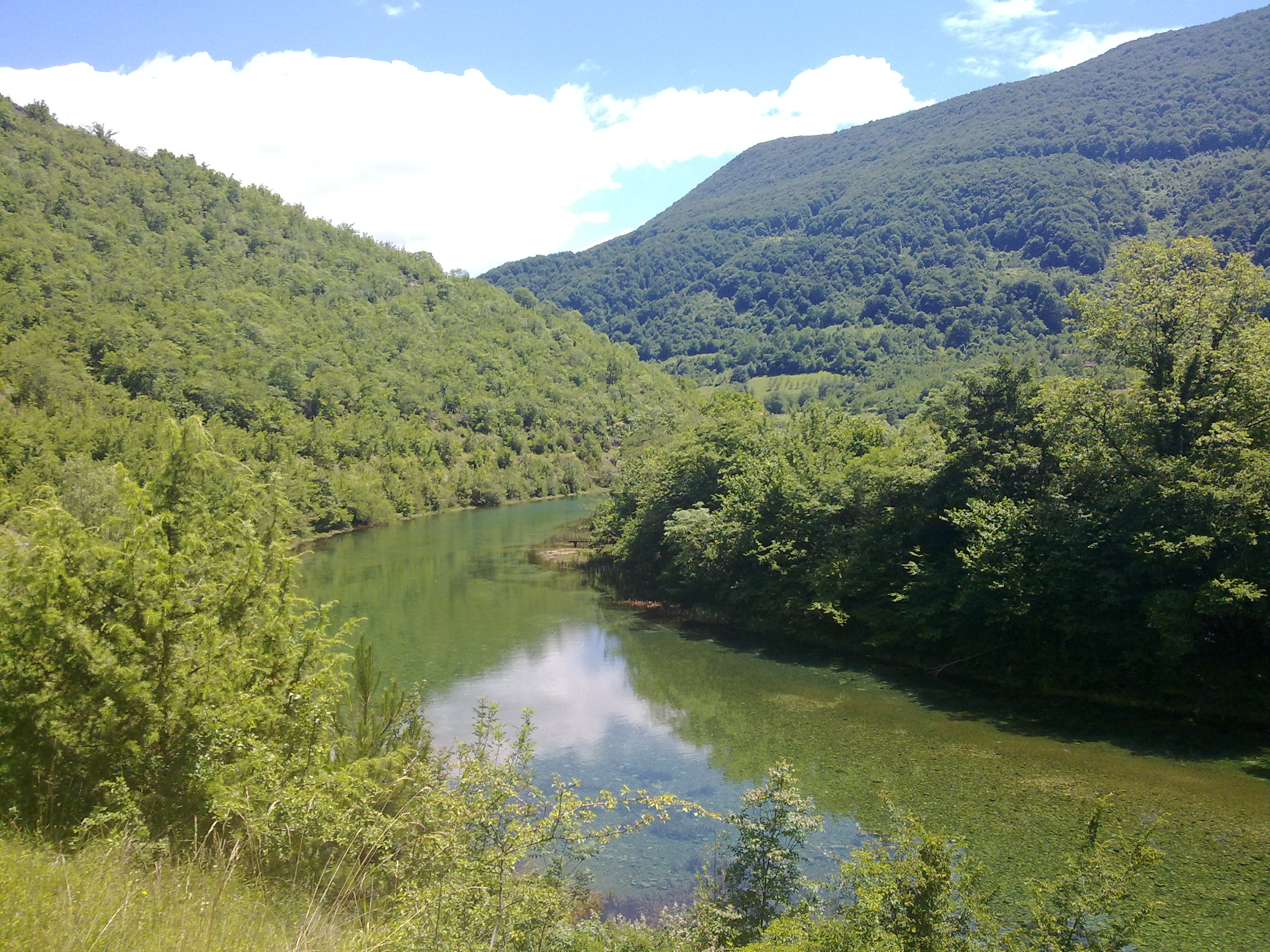
The Ribnik river is a short but significant tributary of the Sana

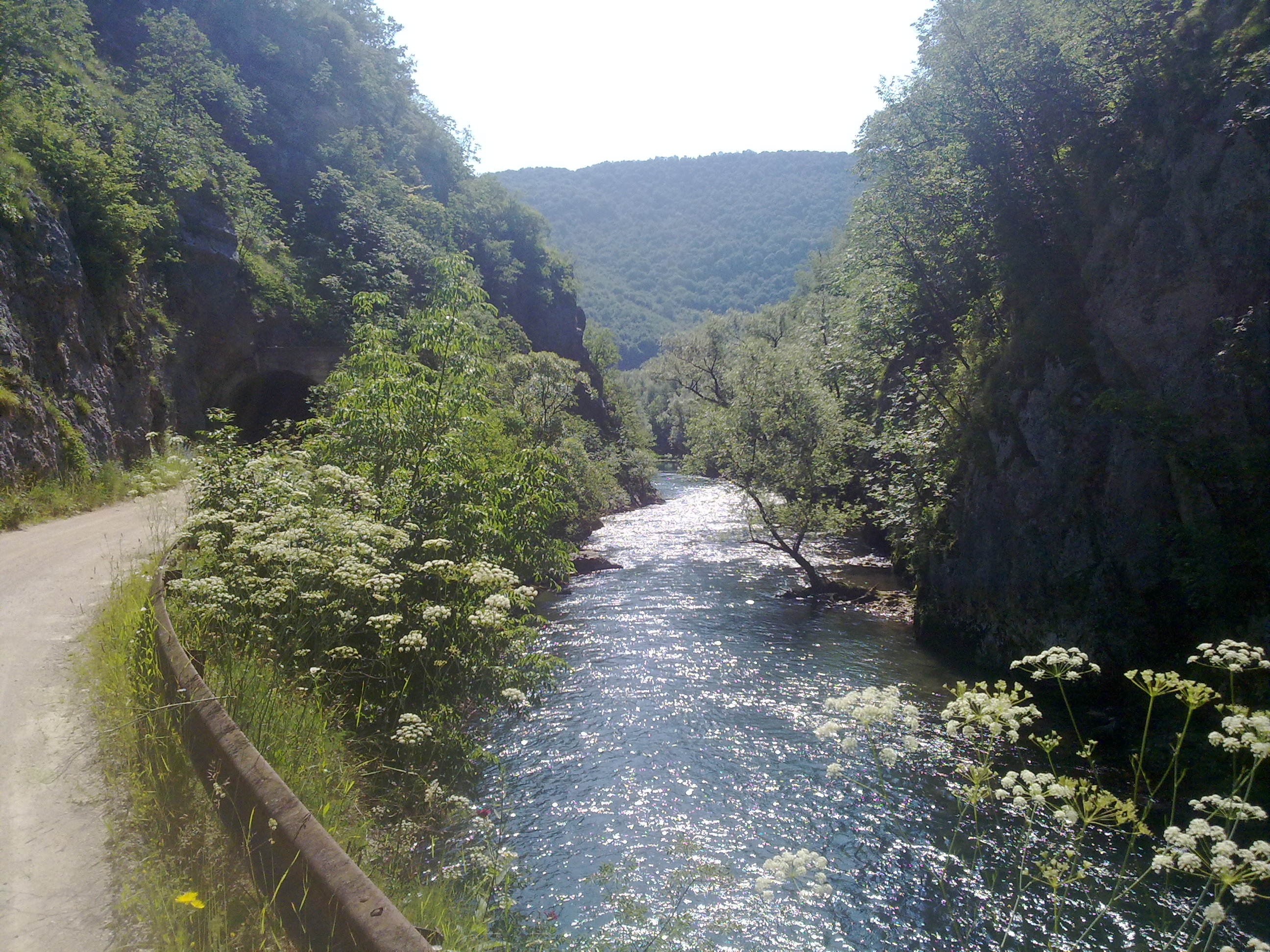
The Sanica river, lower section, just a few kilometres before it meets the Sana

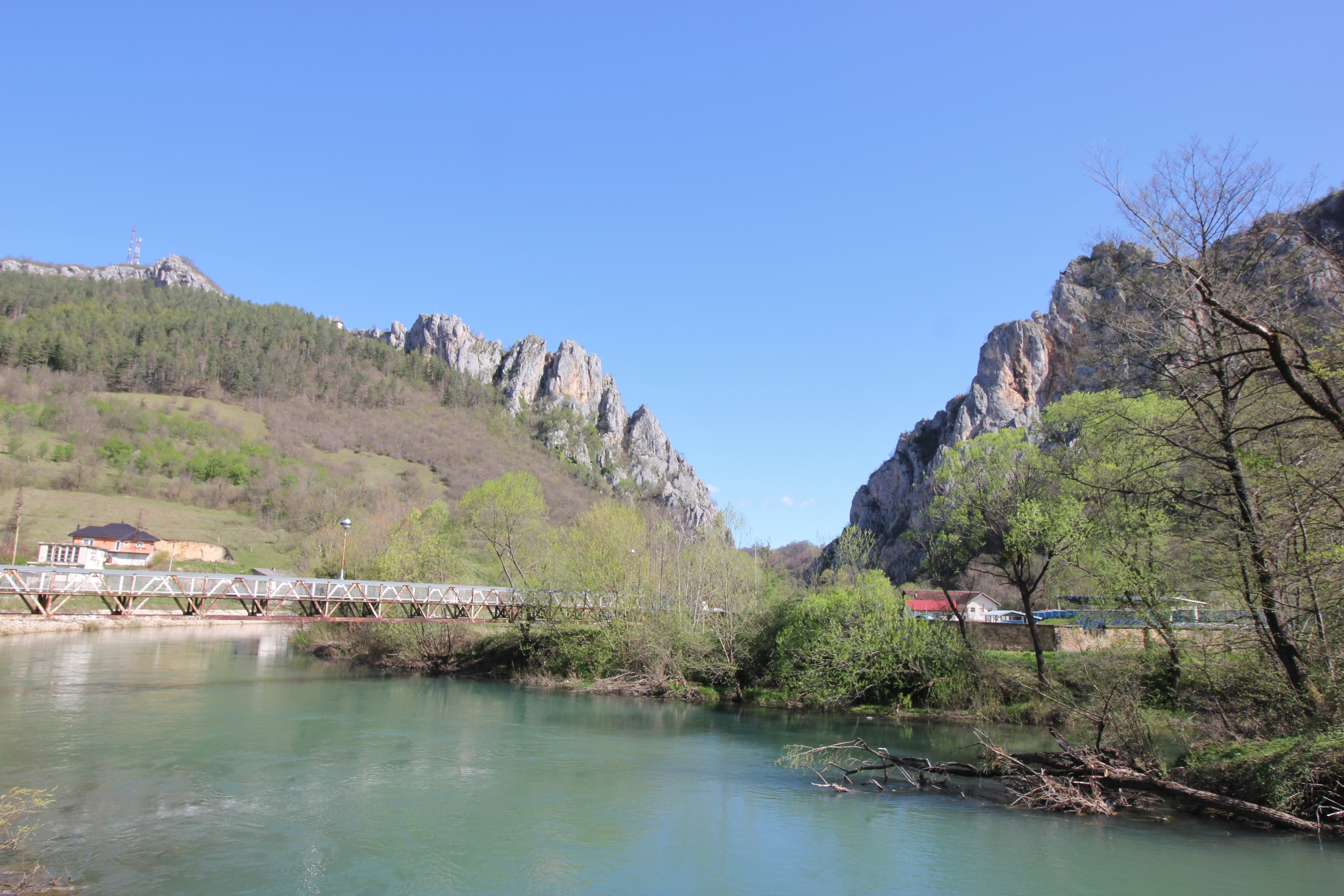
Sana River in Ključ

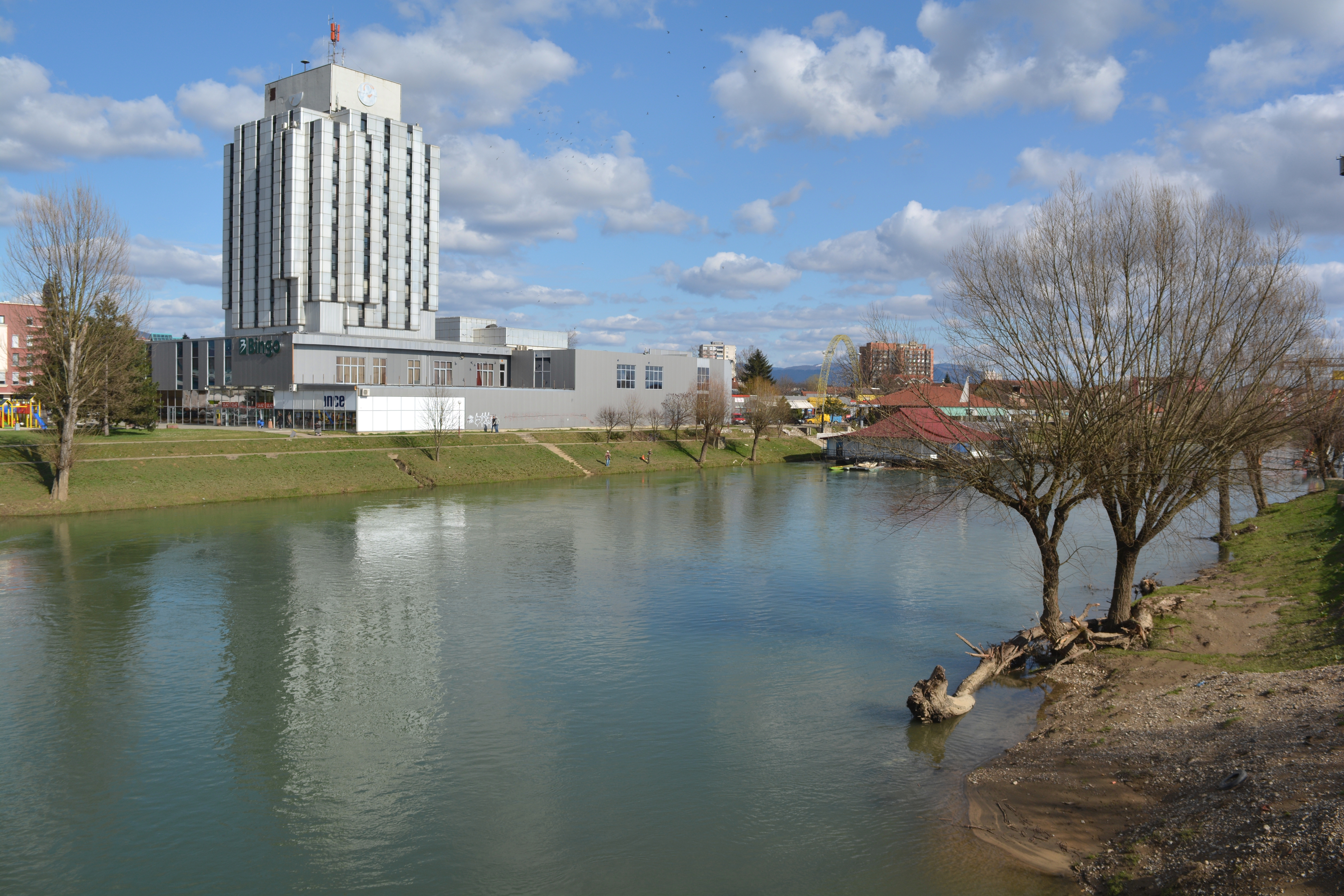
The Sana river in Prijedor

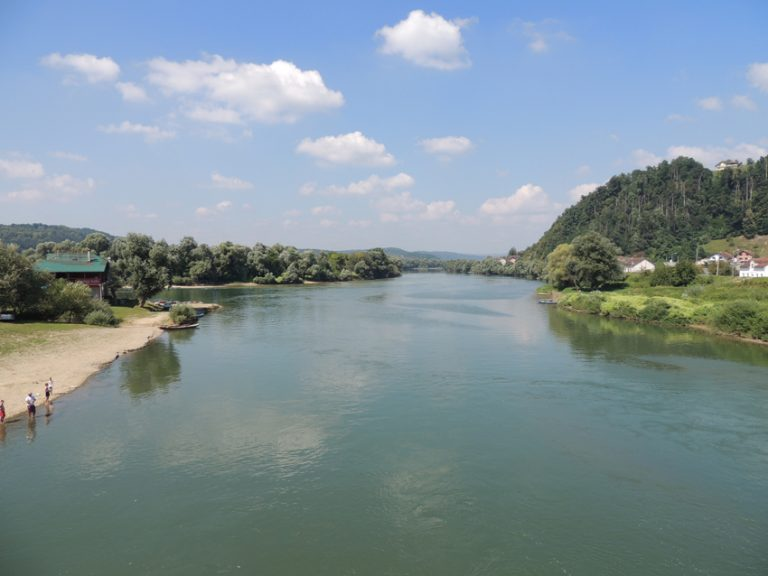
The Sana river at its mouth in Novi Grad

== See also ==
- List of rivers of Bosnia and Herzegovina
