= Marija Bursać =

Yugoslav partisan (1920–1943)

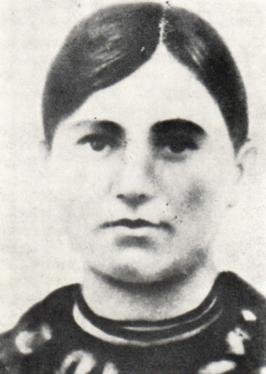
- Photograph of Bursać from 1939
- Born: 2 August 1920; Kamenica, Kingdom of Serbs, Croats and Slovenes
- Died: 23 September 1943 (aged 23); Vidovo Selo, Independent State of Croatia
- Military career
- Allegiance: (Democratic Federal Yugoslavia) Yugoslav Partisans (1941–43)
- Service years: 1943
- Conflicts: World War II in Yugoslavia (KIA)
- Awards: Order of the People's Hero

Marija Bursać (Serbian Cyrillic: Марија Бурсаћ; 2 August 1920 – 23 September 1943) was a member of the Yugoslav Partisans during World War II in Yugoslavia and the first woman proclaimed a People's Hero of Yugoslavia. Bursać was born to a Bosnian Serb farming family in the village of Kamenica, near Drvar. After the invasion of Yugoslavia by the Axis powers and their creation of the Independent State of Croatia in April 1941, Bursać supported the Partisan resistance movement led by the Communist Party of Yugoslavia (KPJ). Like other women in her village, she collected food, clothing, and other supplies for the Partisan war effort. Bursać became a member of the League of Communist Youth of Yugoslavia in September 1941. The following August she was appointed political commissar of a company of the 1st Krajina Agricultural Shock Brigade, which harvested crops in the Sanica River valley, and was admitted to the KPJ at the end of that summer.

Bursać became a Partisan in February 1943, joining the newly formed 10th Krajina Brigade. With the brigade, she fought in the Bosansko Grahovo, Knin, Vrlika and Livno areas and served as a nurse. In September 1943, Bursać was wounded in the leg while throwing hand grenades during an attack on the German base at Prkosi in northwestern Bosnia. As she was being transported to a field hospital at Vidovo Selo, she sang Partisan songs. Bursać's wound soon developed gangrene, and she died at the hospital on 23 September 1943. She was proclaimed a People's Hero of Yugoslavia the following month. Schools, streets and organisations were named in her memory following the war, commemorating her service to the Partisan cause.

== Early life ==
Bursać was born on 2 August 1920 in the village of Kamenica, near Drvar in the region of Bosanska Krajina, the north-western sector of Bosnia and Herzegovina (then part of the Kingdom of Serbs, Croats and Slovenes, renamed as Yugoslavia in 1929). The Drvar area was inhabited primarily by ethnic Serbs, with Bosnian Muslims and Croats forming less than four per cent of the population. Bursać was the oldest of five children of stonemason Nikola Bursać and his wife, Joka, who mostly raised sheep and cattle on their family farm. Like other village girls, Bursać did not go to school—only the boys attended elementary school in Drvar. A shepherdess until age fourteen, she later helped her mother with housekeeping and agricultural work. Bursać became skilled at weaving, spinning, knitting and embroidery before completing a six-month tailoring course in Drvar.

In 1938, an elementary school opened in Kamenica at which Velimir Stojnić was a trainee teacher. Stojnić, a member of the Communist Party of Yugoslavia (Serbo-Croatian Latin: Komunistička partija Jugoslavije or KPJ, outlawed since 1921), organised a public library, reading and sports clubs and a cultural-artistic group. He established a secret KPJ cell in Kamenica in 1939, the first communist organisation in the area. His ideological convictions earned him a following among the village youth, including Marija's brother Dušan. The authorities soon became aware of Stojnić's activities, and he was removed from Kamenica in February 1940.

== World War II ==
On 6 April 1941 Yugoslavia was invaded from all sides by the Axis powers, led by Nazi Germany. The Royal Yugoslav Army (Serbo-Croatian Latin: Vojska Kraljevine Jugoslavije or VKJ) capitulated on 17 April, and the Germans, Italians and Hungarians dismembered the country. A fascist puppet state, the Independent State of Croatia (Serbo-Croatian Latin: Nezavisna Država Hrvatska or NDH, including almost all of modern-day Croatia, all of modern-day Bosnia-Herzegovina and parts of modern-day Serbia) was proclaimed on 10 April. The NDH was an "Italian-German quasi-protectorate", controlled by the Croatian nationalist Ustaše movement under Ante Pavelić. One of the NDH's policies was to eliminate the state's ethnic Serb population with mass killings, expulsions and forced assimilation. The first Drvar Serbs were killed on 18 June 1941. The atrocities accelerated the formation of two large resistance movements in occupied Yugoslavia. Royalists and Serbian nationalists led by VKJ Colonel Draža Mihailović founded the Ravna Gora Movement, whose members were known as Chetniks. The KPJ, led by Josip Broz Tito, decided in Belgrade on 4 July to launch a nationwide armed uprising and the members of the KPJ-led forces became known as Partisans.

=== Pro-Partisan activity ===
Between 20 and 26 July 1941 local KPJ leaders organised three Partisan detachments, armed with about 200 rifles and seven light machine guns, in the immediate vicinity of Drvar; one was the Kamenica Detachment. Men from Kamenica had previously established a camp in a nearby forest for weapons and supplies. Bursać was one of the village's most active women, collecting food and clothing for the insurgents and serving as a courier for the Kamenica camp. On 27 July the Partisans liberated Drvar, beginning the uprising in Bosnia-Herzegovina. Over the next few days, other parts of Bosanska Krajina were also liberated, although at this stage the KPJ had little control of the Serb villagers who took up arms. The liberated area around Drvar and Bosansko Grahovo, under constant attack by the Ustaše, was defended by the Partisans from their surrounding positions. Bursać and other women from Kamenica joined Odbor fonda (the Funds Committee), collecting food, clothing and other supplies for the Partisans, and she made clothes for them from wool and cloth. She joined the League of Communist Youth of Yugoslavia (Serbo-Croatian Latin: Savez komunističke omladine Jugoslavije, or SKOJ) in September 1941.

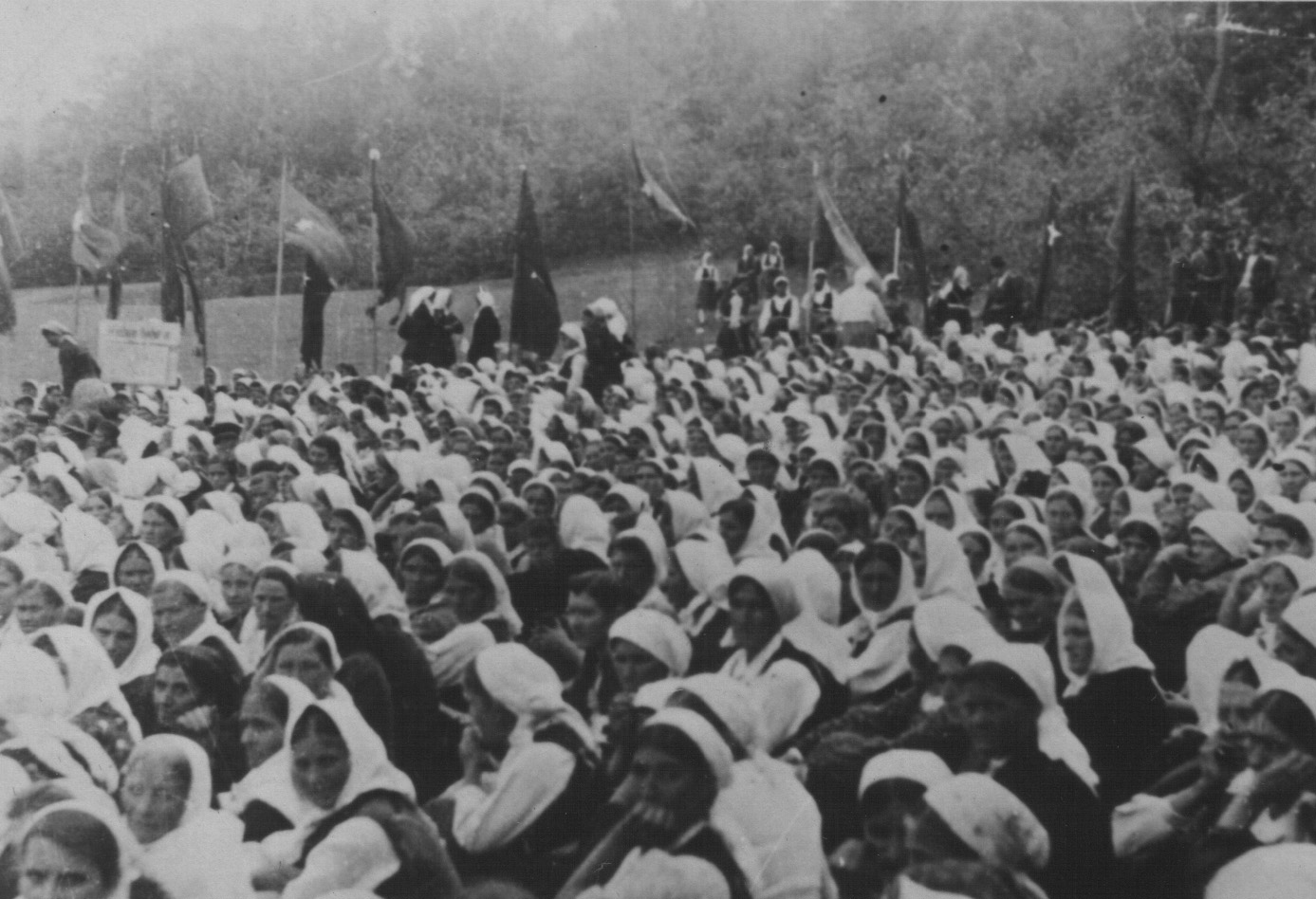
Rally of the Women's Anti-Fascist Front held in Drvar in 1942

On 25 September 1941 Italian troops captured Drvar and Grahovo, but the Partisans retained control of most of the area's villages. By the end of 1941, SKOJ's Kamenica branch had 23 members; the men served in Partisan units and the women, including Bursać, joined labour companies to support the war effort. A literacy course was organised for female members, which Bursać attended. Some villagers gave agricultural products such as milk, cream and eggs to the Italians, receiving salt, kerosene and rice in return. This practice was strongly condemned by the KPJ, which gathered people from several villages in the hall of the Kamenica school in January 1942 to dissuade them from trading with the enemy. After several KPJ members spoke, Bursać began her speech, but was interrupted by disparaging comments and threats from a young man in the audience. At that moment, a group of men stormed into the hall with wooden poles and pitchforks. In the ensuing chaos Bursać shouted, "You can do nothing to us, you will not hinder us!" as the other women fled through the windows. In early 1942 she joined the village committee of the Women's Antifascist Front of Bosnia and Herzegovina (Serbo-Croatian Latin: Antifašistički front žena or AFŽ), a major KPJ-affiliated women's organisation.

On 13 June 1942 Drvar was retaken by the Partisans, with Bursać's labour company clearing rubble and repairing houses in the town. The company also helped in working the land of families whose men were away fighting with the Partisans. In July, Partisan units composed of fighters from Serbia and Montenegro came to Drvar, and Bursać helped carry their wounded to field hospitals in the mountains. She was one of the most active members of Kamenica's SKOJ organisation, which sometimes met at her house. The Partisan-held territory around Drvar expanded significantly, and included the Sanica River valley in late July 1942. The valley's primarily non-Serb population had fled before the advancing Partisans, whom they feared because of Ustaše propaganda. The Partisan command engaged young people from western Bosanska Krajina to harvest wheat and other crops from the valley, transporting them to storage facilities on Mount Grmeč. The workers (mostly young women) were organised into military-style units, which were merged in mid-August into the four-battalion 1st Krajina Agricultural Shock Brigade. Bursać was appointed political commissar of the 3rd Company of the brigade's 2nd Battalion. Guarded by Partisan units, the brigade completed its work despite attacks by enemy planes. Bursać was admitted to the KPJ at the end of summer 1942; at the beginning of 1943, she was president of the village committee of the United Federation of Anti-Fascist Youth of Yugoslavia (Serbo-Croatian Latin: Ujedinjeni savez antifašističke omladine Jugoslavije, or USAOJ).

=== Yugoslav Partisan ===
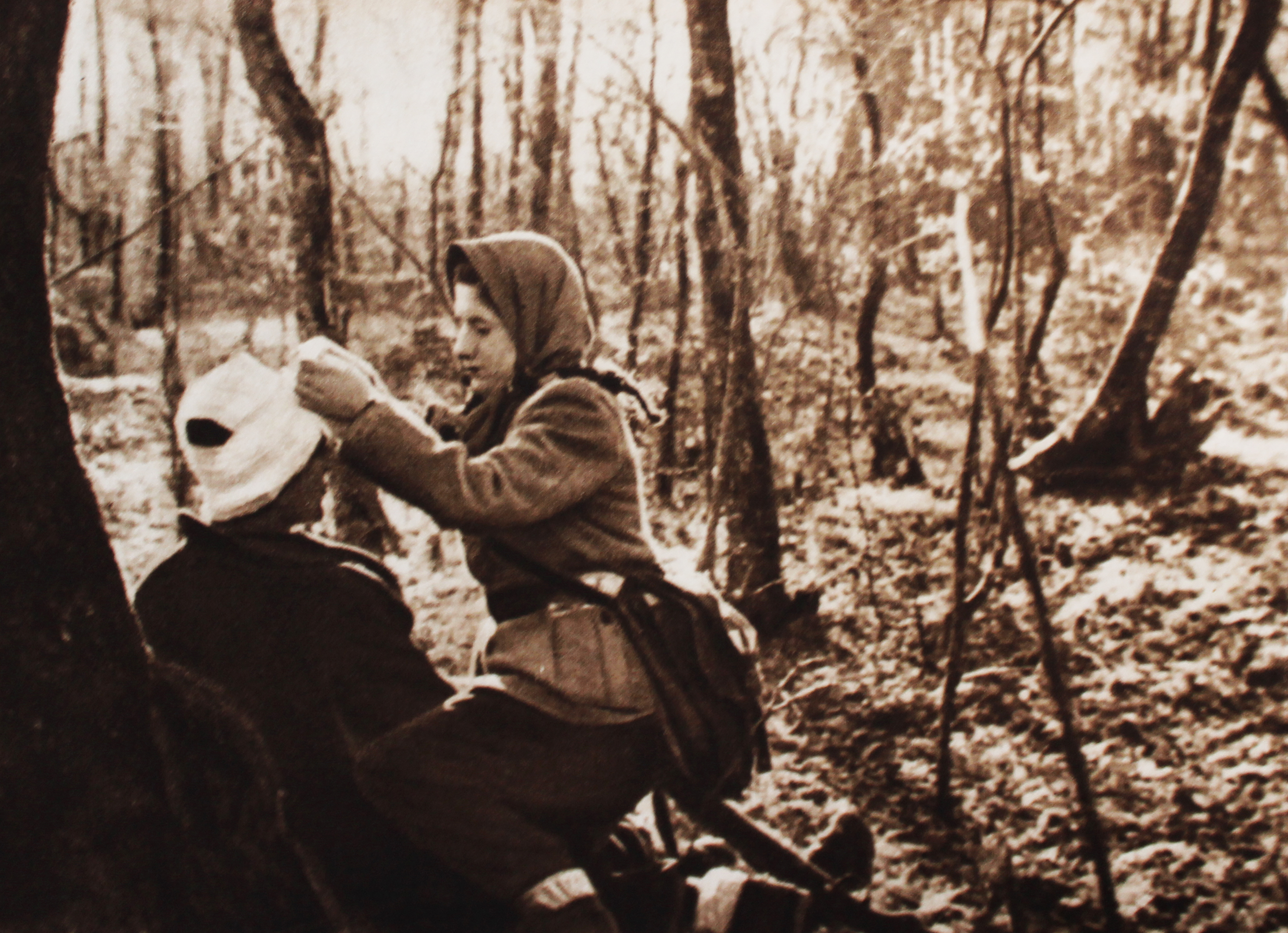
Partisan nurse in action

Tito came to Drvar at the end of January 1943, during a major Axis offensive against the Partisans (code-named Fall Weiss in German). After consulting with Đuro Pucar, the head of the KPJ regional committee for Bosanska Krajina, Tito decided to form a Partisan brigade around a battalion of experienced fighters from Drvar. Additional manpower would consist of recovered Partisans who had been wounded or ill, older men not previously in combat units and young male and female volunteers. The four-battalion 10th Krajina Brigade, intended to play a primarily-defensive role at this stage, was established on 4 February 1943; its 800 members included about 120 women. Bursać, one of the volunteers, was assigned to the 2nd Battalion and was transferred to the 3rd Battalion's 3rd Company the following month. Until September 1943, she fought the Ustaše, Germans, Italians, and anti-communist Chetniks around Grahovo, Knin, Vrlika, Livno and Mount Dinara, was commended for her courage and skill in combat, and served as a nurse. In February and March 1943, during the Axis offensive, the brigade experienced constant enemy attacks, food shortages, cold, deep snow and outbreaks of typhus. Emaciated, Bursać was transferred to the military kitchen at brigade headquarters at the beginning of spring; after a month, she was returned to her company at her insistence. When she became ill some time later, Bursać was sent home to recover.

The Germans had a fortified base, Stützpunkt Podglavica, near Podglavica in the village of Prkosi (between Vrtoče and Kulen Vakuf). The base, with about 500 members of the 373rd (Croatian) Infantry Division and an artillery battery, secured the roads from Bosanski Petrovac to Bihać and Kulen Vakuf. In September 1943, the 2nd and 3rd Battalions of the 10th Krajina Brigade and a battalion of the Drvar–Petrovac Partisan Detachment were directed to attack it. Bursać volunteered to throw hand grenades at the pillboxes and machine-gun nests protecting the base. Although her company commander objected because she still appeared ill, Bursać insisted on throwing the grenades. The three Partisan battalions attacked the base from three directions on 18 September at 11 pm. Bursać and her group of grenade throwers destroyed several pillboxes before they came under fire from another. They destroyed the pillbox, but she received a serious leg wound and was carried to a less exposed area.

The Partisans overran portions of the base, retreating before daybreak after the arrival of German reinforcements from Vrtoče and Kulen Vakuf. The brigade reportedly captured four howitzers, two mortars, a heavy machine gun, ten light machine guns, five rifles, a mobile radio and 29 enemy soldiers, and Stützpunkt Podglavica reported 31 German soldiers missing after the attack. The Germans described the night attack as eerie, with female Partisans' shrill shouts of "Forward!" (Serbo-Croatian Latin: Napred!). The battle at Prkosi was the first major offensive action by the 10th Krajina Brigade; in 1944, they participated in the liberation of Belgrade.

After the battle, Bursać and other heavily-wounded Partisans were carried on stretchers to the field hospital in the village of Vidovo Selo, about 40 kilometres (25 mi) away over rugged terrain. During the arduous journey (which took over three days), she sang Partisan songs such as:

Naša borba zahtijeva
Kad se gine da se pjeva ...

Our struggle thus demands
That while dying, one sings ...

Bursać had lost much blood and her wound developed gangrene, which the field hospital was poorly equipped to treat. She died in Vidovo Selo on 23 September 1943, and was buried with military honours at Kamenica; deputy commissar Veljko Ražnatović spoke on behalf of the 10th Krajina Brigade. Bursać's final eulogy was delivered by her brother Dušan, leader of the SKOJ district committee for Drvar.

== Legacy ==
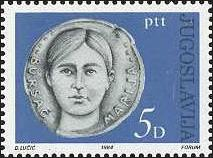
Bursać was commemorated on a 1984 Yugoslav postage stamp.

Bursać became a People's Hero of Yugoslavia on 15 October 1943, the first woman to receive the honour. Her proclamation was published in the October 1943 issue of the Bulletin of the Supreme Headquarters of the National Liberation Army and Partisan Detachments of Yugoslavia:

По одлуци Врховног штаба Народноослободилачке војске и партизанских одреда Југославије, a на предлог V корпуса Народноослободилачке војске Југославије, додељује се назив народног хероја другарици Марији Бурсаћ, борцу-бомбашу III батаљона X крајишке бригаде. Другарица Марија била је примјер јунаштва у свим борбама и на крају дала свој живот за слободу свога народа јуришајући на ровове непријатеља код с. Пркоса. "By decision of the Supreme Headquarters of the National Liberation Army and Partisan Detachments of Yugoslavia, and at the proposal of the 5th Corps of the National Liberation Army of Yugoslavia, the Order of the People's Hero has been conferred on comrade Marija Bursać, a hand-grenade thrower of the 3rd Battalion of the 10th Krajina Brigade. Comrade Marija was an example of heroism in all fights and ultimately gave her life for the freedom of her people charging enemy trenches at the village of Prkosi."

Yugoslav writer Branko Ćopić wrote a poem, Marija na Prkosima ("Marija at Prkosi"), about Bursać. Its title, which may also be interpreted as "Marija defiant", is a play on words. Bursać "entered the triptych of history, legend, and poetry in the Yugoslav lands", according to author Jelena Batinić. After the war, schools, streets, and organisations in Yugoslavia were named after her; a Belgrade neighborhood bears her name. A 2013 comic strip, Marija na Prkosima, was published in the Serbian daily newspaper Danas as part of its Odbrana utopije ("Defense of Utopia") comic-strip project. Graphic artist Lazar Bodroža's strip combines events from Bursać's life with verses of Ćopić's poem and left-wing visual symbolism.
