= Tihomir Lešić =

Bosnian journalist (1931–1976)

- Born: 18 August 1931; Belgrade, Kingdom of Yugoslavia
- Died: 25 January 1976 (aged 44); Dubrovnik, SFR Yugoslavia
- Occupation: Journalist
- Writing career
- Notable work: Zemljo ne ljuti se (1978)

Tihomir Lešić (18 August 1931— 25 January 1976) was a Bosnian journalist. Many consider him to be one of the leading journalists in Bosnia and Herzegovina in the 20th century. In 2007, Tuzlanski list established an award after him for the best short story.

== Biography ==
He was born on August 18, 1931, in Belgrade. His father, Božidar, was a railway worker. Because of that family constantly changed place of residence. Tihomir Lešić grew up in various cities. He completed primary and secondary chemical school in Derventa and Zagreb. As a journalist, he started writing in Derventski list. Later he continued at the Zagreb edition of Borba, then Front slobode in Tuzla, then Belgrade's magazines NIN and Duga, Sarajevo's Svijet, and ended up at the newspaper of the SodaSo combine in Tuzla. He lived and worked in Tuzla for the longest time. He is the author of unsurpassed stories from the region of Tuzla and beyond.

At a time when political suitability was sought, Tihomir Lešić was apolitical. His application for a job at the SodaSo combine in Tuzla is interesting. On a piece of checkered paper he wrote: "Please accept me for the job. I do not meet the requirements of the competition at all, but I know how to write!" He was immediately hired, because all Yugoslavian newspapers "fought" for his stories. Gojko Berić wrote about him and his contribution to Bosnian journalism.

Tihomir Lešić died in Dubrovnik on January 25, 1976. There were various rumors surrounding his death. A few days before, he published a story "Umrijeti u malom gradu" (To Die in a Small Town) in which he seemed to announce his death.

Two years after death, a book of his stories "Zemljo ne ljuti se" was published in Tuzla. It is publication with 35 selected stories, which was voluntarily illustrated by the greatest caricaturists of the time, Zuko Džumhur, Ivo Kušanić, Milan Jovanović, Hasan Fazlić and Danilo Bošković.
