= Zdena (river) =

River in Bosnia and Herzegovina

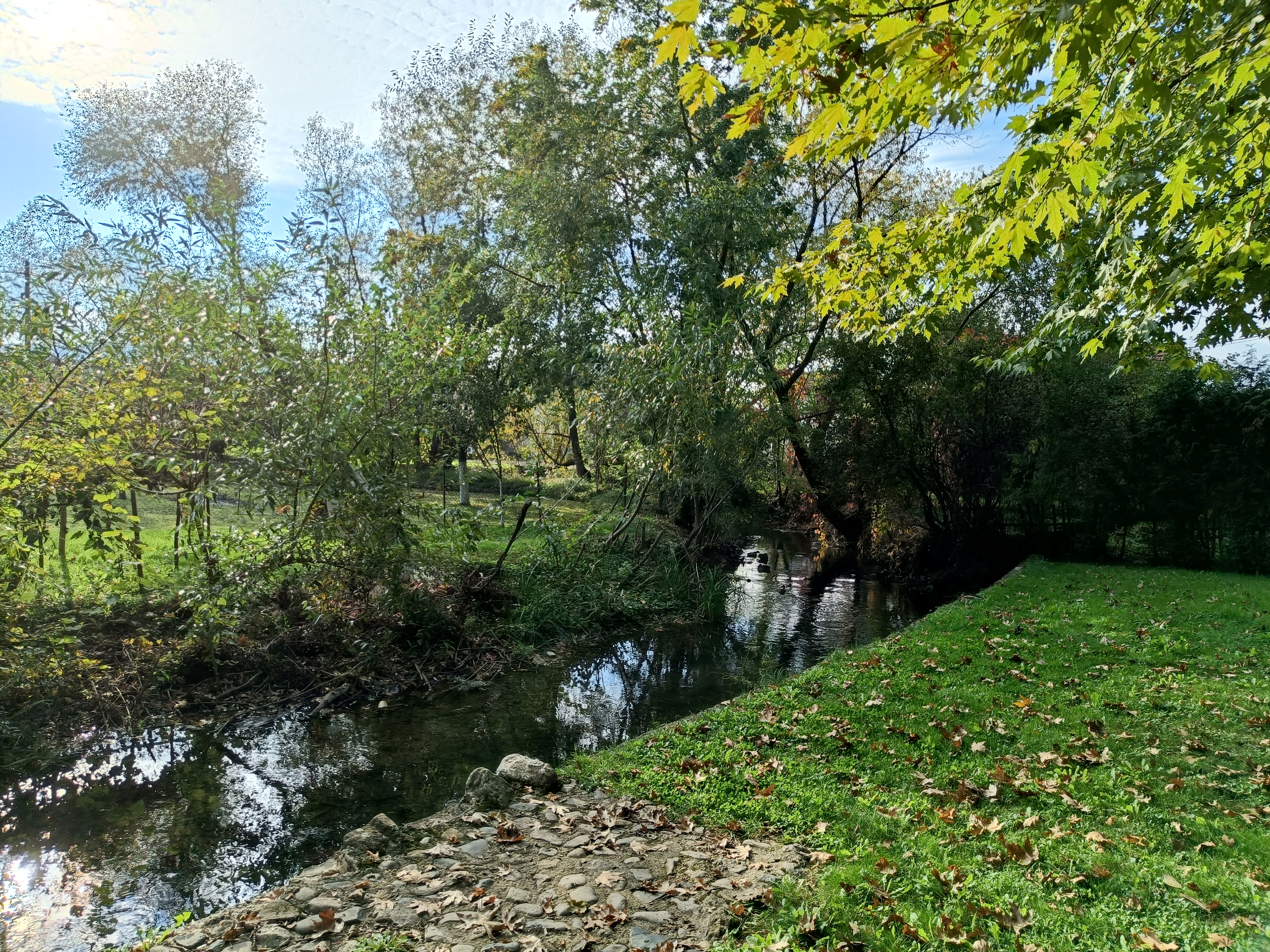

- Location within Bosnia and Herzegovina

Location
- Country: Bosnia and Herzegovina
- Region: Bosanska Krajina
- Municipality: Sanski Most

Physical characteristics
- Source
  - location: Zdena (outskirt)
  - coordinates: 44°45′43″N 16°37′44″E
- Mouth
  - location: Sanski Most
  - coordinates: 44°45′56″N 16°39′55″E
- Length: 5 km (3.1 mi)

Basin features
- Progression: Sana→ Una→ Sava→ Danube→ Black Sea

Zdena (Bosnian: Rijeka Zdena; Serbian Cyrillic: Ријека Здена) is a river in the northwestern part of Bosnia and Herzegovina, a left tributary of the Sana, with which it connects in the center of Sanski Most.The source of Zdena is a new plant for the distribution of drinking water to the citizens of Sanski Most. Salmonid water is common and used to be full of grayling and brown trout. Grayling is now only in traces due to high water pollution, mostly due to the direct discharge of sewage.

== Geography ==
The river Zdena is 5 km (3.1 mi) long and springs in the suburb of the same name. Zdena is characterized by its winding course, broken into several tributaries, which meet again in the city center where it flows into the river Sana.

== History ==
A legend says that Bliha and Zdena were two sisters that had two brothers at the time of the plague. The two brothers wanted to marry the sisters to save humanity but the sisters did not want that and the brothers killed them. In the place where they were buried two rivers flowed and the two rivers were Bliha and Zdena In 1896 a large prehistoric site ( 6th – 3rd century BC) was discovered at the confluence of the Zdena and Sana rivers; this was an iron - working centre, the finds including castings, hearths, forging tools, large amounts of iron slag

== Other ==
A few years ago, the Zdena spring was visited by a group of French divers who took photos while diving into the Zdena spring at a depth of 140 m (460 ft), which show that the fauna is diverse both at these depths and in that darkness. They found Olms, shellfish and various shrimps there. The manager of the Social Center Zdena says that the arrangement of the river was not the first priority at the citizens' forums, but that it was at the very top for projects that are important for this local community.

== See also ==
- List of rivers in bosnia and herzegovina
