= Bliha Falls =

Waterfall in Bosnia and Herzegovina

Bliha Falls Vodopad Blihe Blihin Skok
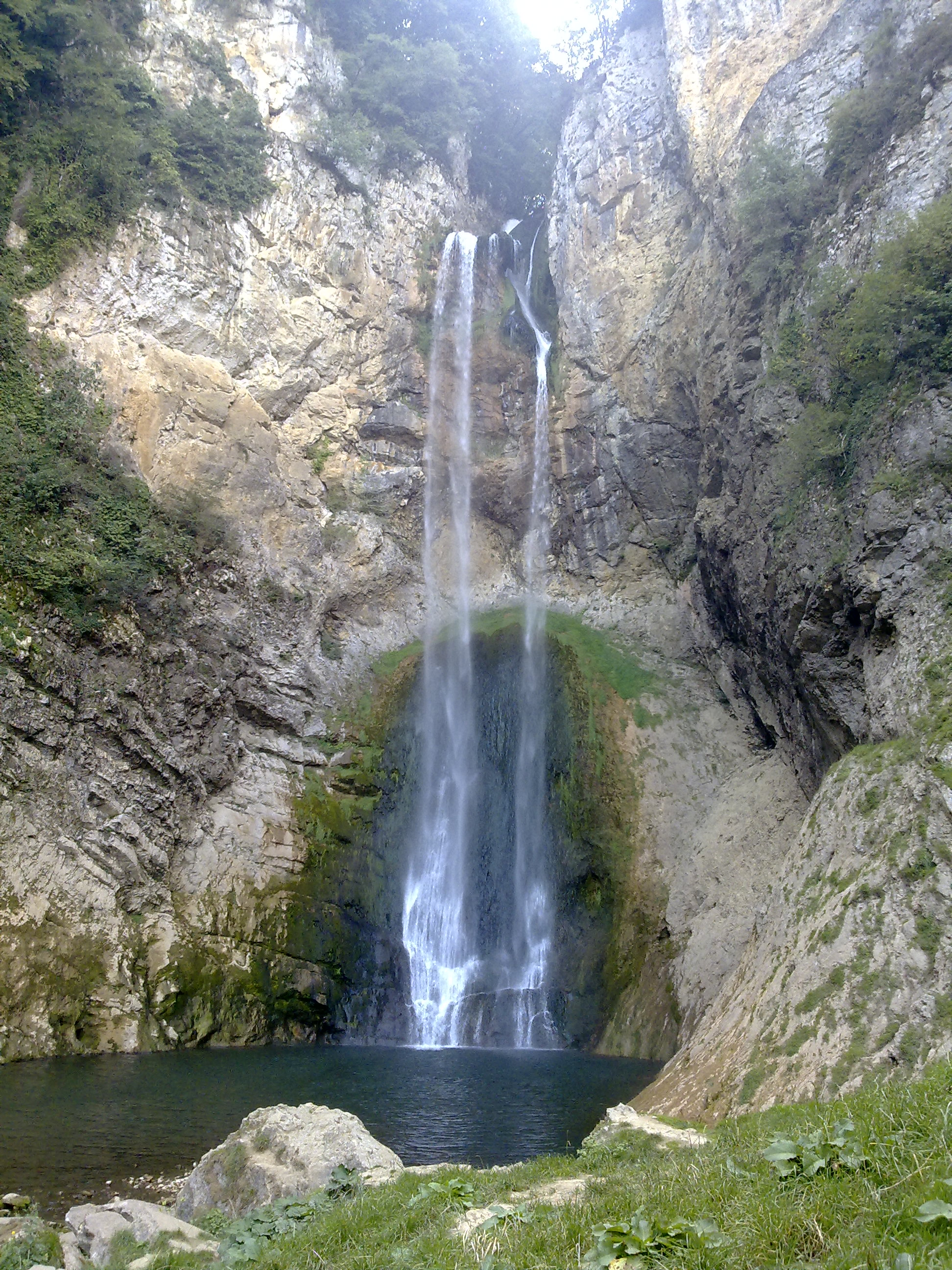
- Bliha Falls

- Location within Bosnia and Herzegovina
- Location: Sanski Most
- Coordinates: 44°47′21″N 16°31′30″E
- Type: horsetail-plunge-punchbowl
- Total height: 56 m (184 ft)
- Number of drops: 1
- Average width: ≈10 m (33 ft)
- Watercourse: Bliha

The Bliha Falls (Bosnian: Vodopad Blihe; or Bosnian: Slapovi Blihe), called by locals Blihin Skok (English: Bliha's Jump or English: Leap of Bliha), is a waterfall on the Bliha river located near Fajtovci, 14 kilometers west of Sanski Most, Bosnia and Herzegovina. At this point, the water of the Bliha drops from 56 meters high cliff. It is designated a natural monument since 1965.

== Legends surrounding it ==
There is an Illyrian legend surrounding the Bliha falls;
All of humanity, except for a brother and two sisters was wiped out. To continue mankind, the three had to have children together. One of the sisters, named Bliha, was so sad because her brother had impregnated her that she jumped off a cliff, and turned into the river, which created this waterfall, promptly named "Bliha's jump." The other sister turned into tears, and she now flows through Sanski Most quietly.

== See also ==
- List of waterfalls
- List of rivers of Bosnia and Herzegovina
