= Kamenica, Drvar =

Kamenica Каменица
- Village
- Location within Bosnia and Herzegovina
- Coordinates: 44°22′45″N 16°19′17″E
- Country: Bosnia and Herzegovina
- Entity: Federation of Bosnia and Herzegovina
- Canton: Canton 10
- Municipality: Drvar

Area
  - Total: 35.87 km^{2} (13.85 sq mi)

Population (2013)
  - Total: 42
  - Density: 1.2/km^{2} (3.0/sq mi)
- Time zone: UTC+1 (CET)
  - Summer (DST): UTC+2 (CEST)

Kamenica (Serbian Cyrillic: Каменица) is a village in the Municipality of Drvar in Canton 10 of the Federation of Bosnia and Herzegovina, an entity of Bosnia and Herzegovina.

== Demographics ==
According to the 2013 census, its population was 42.

Ethnicity in 2013
Ethnicity	Number	Percentage
Serbs	41	97.6%
Bosniaks	1	2.4%
Total	42	100%

== Notable residents ==
- Marija Bursać

== Bibliography ==
- Ethnicity/National Affiliation, Religion and Mother Tongue (PDF). Sarajevo: Agency for Statistics of Bosnia and Herzegovina. 2019.
