= Blagaj, Rijeka =

Blagaj Rijeka Благај Ријека
- Village
- Interactive map of Blagaj Rijeka
- Location within Bosnia and Herzegovina
- Coordinates: 45°02′20″N 16°28′00″E
- Country: Bosnia and Herzegovina
- Entity: Republika Srpska
- Municipality: Novi Grad
- Time zone: UTC+1 (CET)
  - Summer (DST): UTC+2 (CEST)

Blagaj Rijeka (Cyrillic: Благај Ријека) is a village in the municipality of Novi Grad, Republika Srpska, Bosnia and Herzegovina.

It lies at the confluence of the river Japra into the Sana river, across Blagaj Japra.
