= Blagaj, Japra =

Village in Bosnia and Herzegovina

Blagaj Japra
- village
- Interactive map of Blagaj Japra
- Location within Bosnia and Herzegovina
- Coordinates: 45°02′N 16°27′E
- Country: Bosnia and Herzegovina
- Entity: Republika Srpska
- Municipality: Novi Grad
- Time zone: UTC+1 (CET)
  - Summer (DST): UTC+2 (CEST)

Blagaj Japra, known historically as Blagaj on the Sana, is a village in the municipality of Novi Grad, Republika Srpska, Bosnia and Herzegovina.

It lies at the confluence of the river Japra into the Sana river, across Blagaj Rijeka.
