= Gojko Berić =

Bosnian journalist (born 1939)

- Born: 15 April 1939 (age 87); Donji Vrbljani, Kingdom of Yugoslavia,
- Occupation: journalist
- Writing career
- Notable work: Pisma nebeskom narodu (2000)

Gojko Berić (Serbian Cyrillic: Гојко Берић; born 15 April 1939), is a Bosnian journalist, long-time columnist for the daily Oslobođenje. The oldest active journalist in Bosnia and Herzegovina.

== Biography ==
He was born in 1939 in Donji Vrbljani near Ključ. He grew up in Mostar, where he graduated from junior gimnasium and the Mechanical Engineering Technical School. As a journalist Berić started to write in high school. His professional career started in 1962 at newspaper Sloboda in Mostar. He was a correspondent for Oslobođenje from Mostar and Dubrovnik, and then a columnist for this newspaper for many years.

Berić has won a number of journalists awards and was named Journalist of the Year in Bosnia and Herzegovina in 1992. He is the recipient of the Sixth of April Sarajevo Award of the City of Sarajevo in 2001. The book Pisma nebeskom narodu was declared the Book of the Year in Bosnia and Herzegovina in 2000 by the Bosna International Forum. Also, he received Oslobođenje Lifetime Achievement Award 30 August and Oslobođenje Award for the greatest professional achievement (2003). In 2008, he won Lifetime Achievement Award of the Journalists' Association of Bosnia and Herzegovina.

He lives and works in Sarajevo.

== Works ==
- Smrt u ljetnom Dubrovniku (Sarajevo, 1985)
- Sarajevo na kraju svijeta (Sarajevo, 1994)
- Pisma nebeskom narodu (Sarajevo, 2000)
- Stanica Haag (Sarajevo, 2005)
- Zvijeri na okupu (Sarajevo, 2006)
- Zbogom XX. stoljeće: sjećanja Ive Vejvode (Zagreb, 2013)
- Šta je život bez dušmana (Sarajevo, 2019)
- Dodir časne sestre (Sarajevo-Zagreb, 2024)
