= Gornji Ribnik =

Gornji Ribnik Горњи Рибник
- Village
- Location within Bosnia and Herzegovina
- Coordinates: 44°25′N 16°49′E
- Country: Bosnia and Herzegovina
- Entity: Republika Srpska
- Municipality: Ribnik
- Time zone: UTC+1 (CET)
  - Summer (DST): UTC+2 (CEST)

Gornji Ribnik (Serbian Cyrillic: Горњи Рибник) is a village in the municipality of Ribnik, Republika Srpska, Bosnia and Herzegovina. The river Ribnik runs through the settlement.
