= Sanica (river) =

Sanica Саница
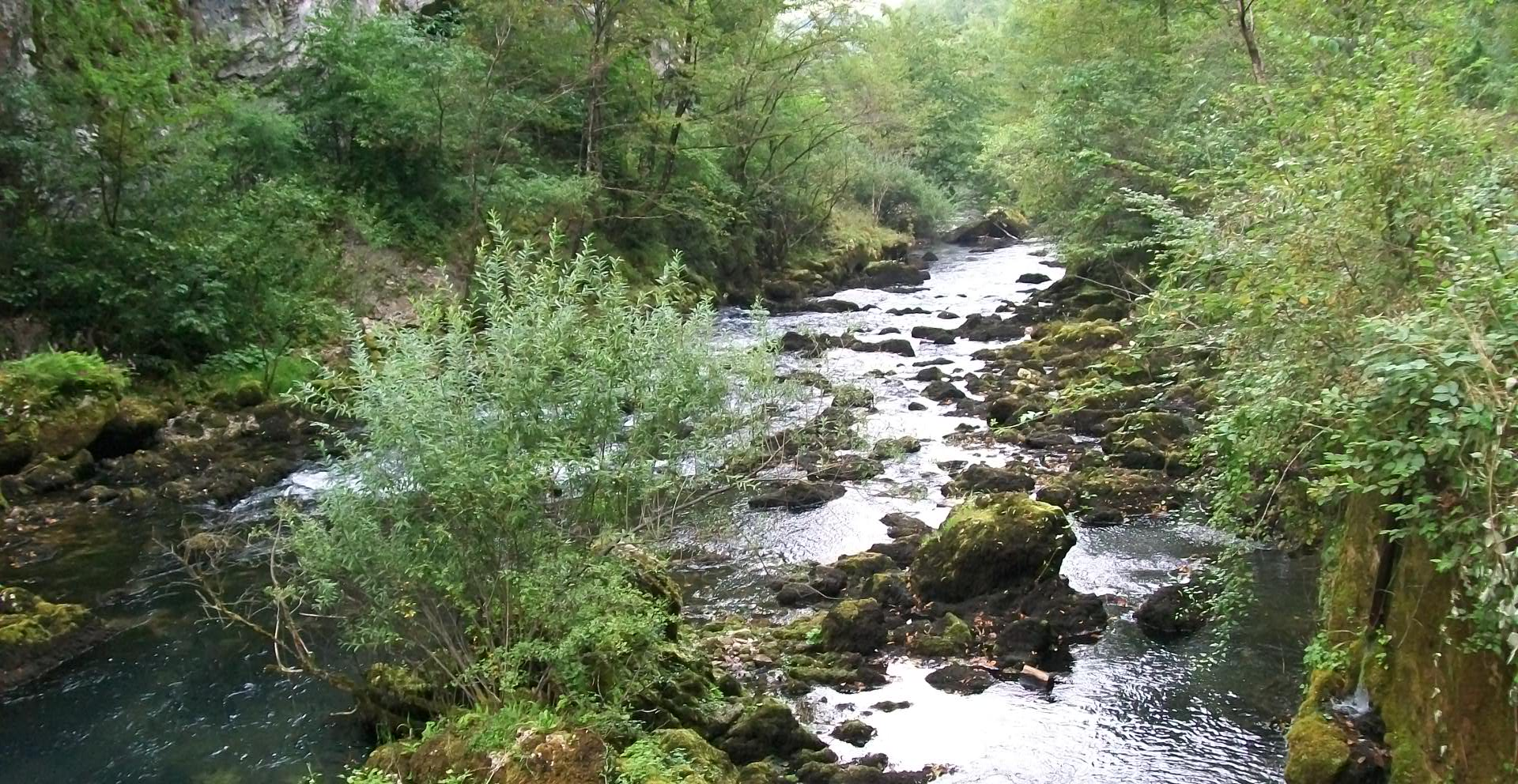

Location
- Country: Bosnia and Herzegovina

Physical characteristics
- Source
  - location: 44.60645025426772°N 16.611786994119978°E
- Mouth
  - location: Sana
  - coordinates: 44°41′25″N 16°43′39″E
- Length: 22 km (14 mi)

Basin features
- Progression: Sana→ Una→ Sava→ Danube→ Black Sea

Sanica is a minor river in the north-west part of Bosnia and Herzegovina. It flows into the Sana near Vrhpolje. The village Sanica got its name from the river.
