= Bliha =

River in Bosnia and Herzegovina

Bliha Блиха
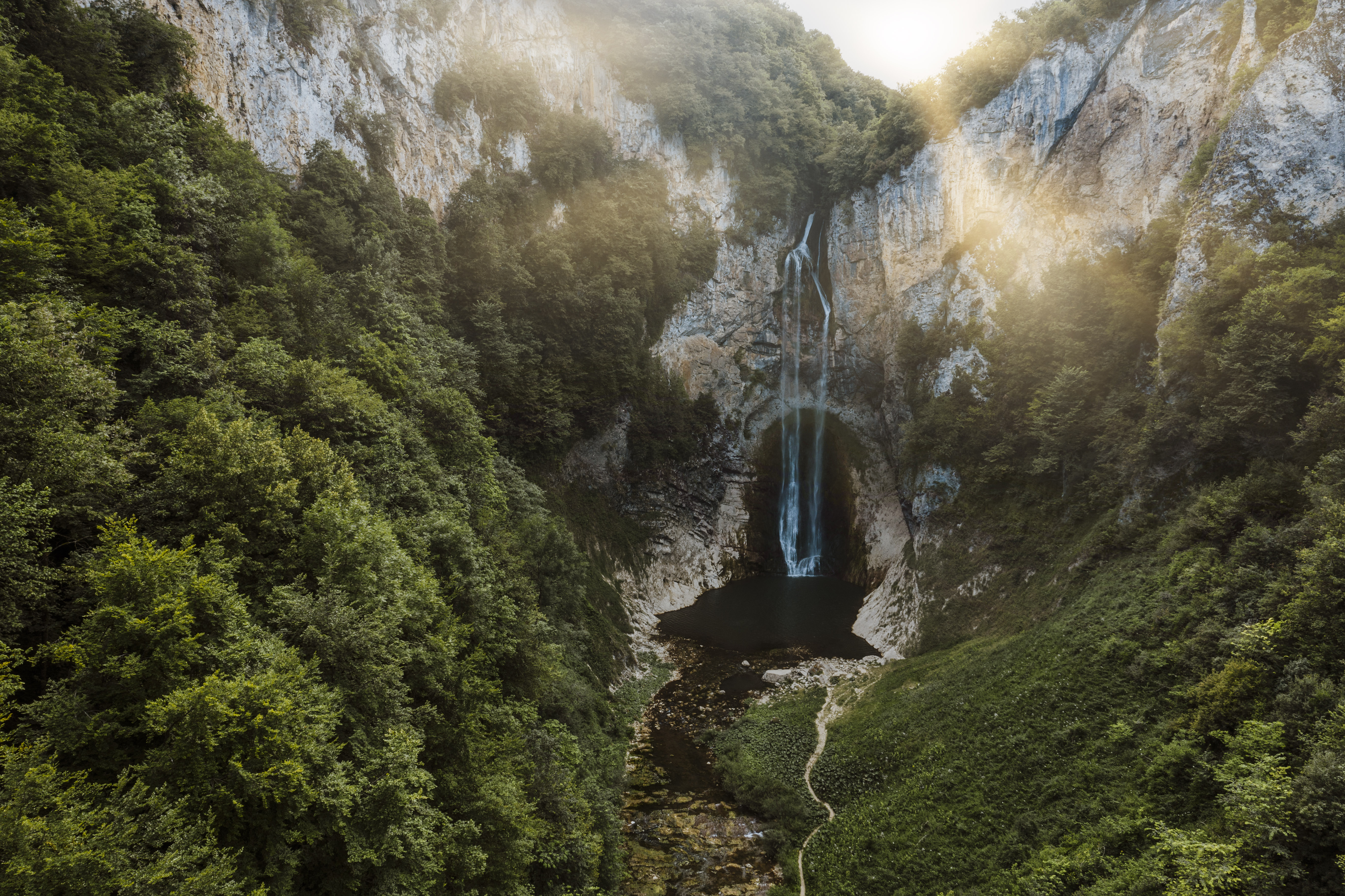
- Bliha Falls

- mouth of Bliha river in Bosnia and Herzegovina

Location
- Country: Bosnia and Herzegovina
- Bosanska Krajina: Sanski Most

Physical characteristics
- Source
  - location: Donji Lipnik
  - coordinates: 44.806278°N 16.394323°E
  - elevation: ≈450 m (1,480 ft)
- Mouth
  - location: Sana
  - coordinates: 44.780685350318734°N 16.664379724670287°E
  - elevation: 154 m (505 ft)
- Length: 24 km (15 mi)

Basin features
- Progression: Sana→ Una→ Sava→ Danube→ Black Sea
- Tributaries
  - left: Suvača, Obarak, Modrašnica, Hatiraj, Suhača
- Waterfalls: Bliha Falls

The Bliha (Serbian Cyrillic: Блиха) is a river in Bosnia and Herzegovina. It is a left tributary of the Sana river, located in region of Bosanska Krajina, on Sanski Most municipality territory and town vicinity.

== Bliha Falls ==
The Bliha Falls (Bosnian: Vodopad Blihe; or Bosnian: Slapovi Blihe), called by locals Blihin Skok (English: Bliha's Jump or English: Leap of Bliha), is a waterfall on the Bliha river located near Fajtovci, 14 kilometers west of Sanski Most, Bosnia and Herzegovina. The 56 meters high waterfall is designated a natural monument since 1965.

== See also ==
- List of rivers of Bosnia and Herzegovina
