= Prkosi =

Prkosi Пркоси
- Village
- Location within Bosnia and Herzegovina
- Coordinates: 44.6267°N 16.1158°E
- Country: Bosnia and Herzegovina
- Entity: Federation of Bosnia and Herzegovina
- Canton: Una-Sana
- Municipality: Bosanski Petrovac

Area
  - Total: 11.18 sq mi (28.95 km^{2})

Population (2023)
  - Total: 4
  - Density: 0.36/sq mi (0.14/km^{2})
- Time zone: UTC+1 (CET)
  - Summer (DST): UTC+2 (CEST)

Prkosi (Serbian Cyrillic: Пркоси) is a village in the municipality of Bosanski Petrovac, Bosnia and Herzegovina.

== Demographics ==
According to the 2013 census, its population was 14, all Serbs.

In 2023, there are only 4 Serbs living in the village.
