= Klekovača =

Mountain in Bosnia and Herzegovina

- Клековача
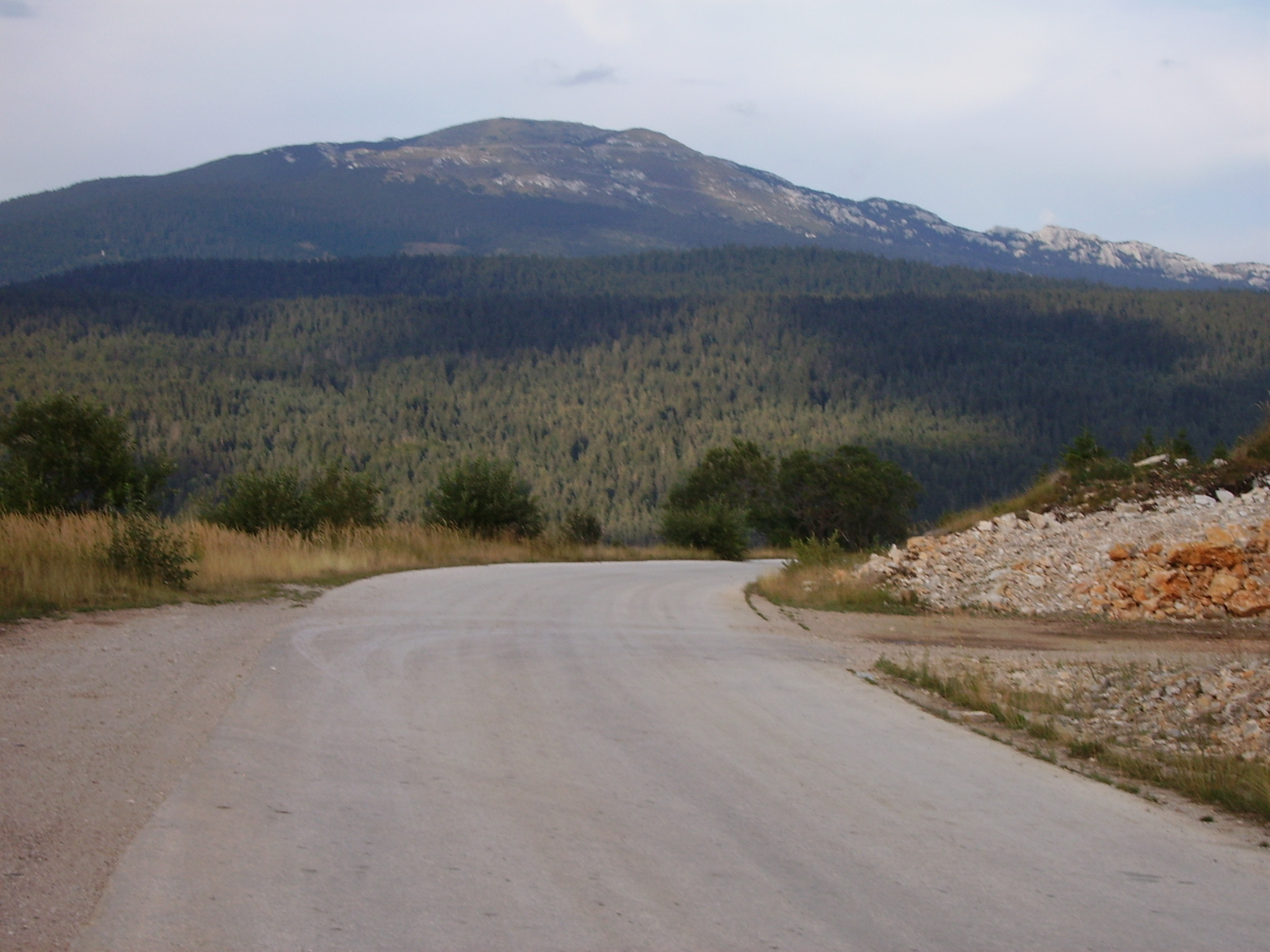
- Klekovača

Highest point
- Elevation: 1,962 m (6,437 ft)
- Coordinates: 44°25′50″N 16°30′34″E

Geography
- Location within Bosnia and Herzegovina
- Location: Bosnia and Herzegovina
- Parent range: Dinaric Alps

Klekovača (Serbian Cyrillic: Клековача) is a mountain in the Dinaric Alps of western Bosnia and Herzegovina, located near Drvar and Bosanski Petrovac. The highest peak is the Velika Klekovača at 1,969 m (6,460 ft).
