= Donji Vrbljani =

Village in Republika Srpska, Bosnia and Herzegovina

Donji Vrbljani Доњи Врбљани
- Village
- Location within Bosnia and Herzegovina
- Coordinates: 44°21′27″N 16°49′51″E
- Country: Bosnia and Herzegovina
- Entity: Republika Srpska
- Municipality: Ribnik
- Time zone: UTC+1 (CET)
  - Summer (DST): UTC+2 (CEST)

Donji Vrbljani (Serbian Cyrillic: Доњи Врбљани) is a village in the municipality of Ribnik, Republika Srpska, Bosnia and Herzegovina.

== Notable people ==
- Gojko Berić, Bosnian journalist
