= Vitorog =

Mountain in Bosnia and Herzegovina

- Виторог
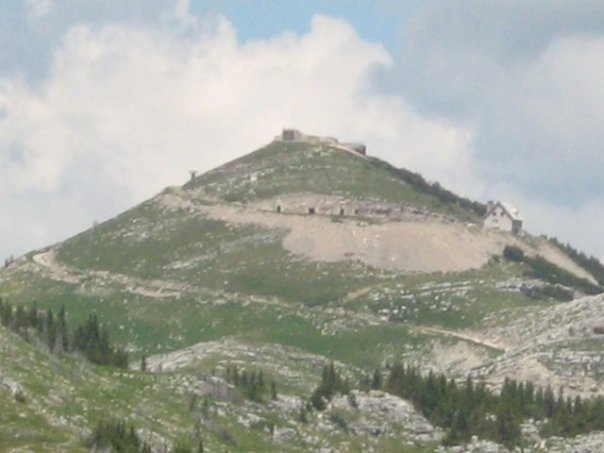
- Panoramic view on Vitorog

Highest point
- Elevation: 1,907 m (6,257 ft)
- Coordinates: 44°07′10″N 17°02′39″E

Geography
- Location within Bosnia and Herzegovina
- Location: Bosnia and Herzegovina
- Parent range: Dinaric Alps

Vitorog (Serbian Cyrillic: Виторог) is a mountain in the municipality of Glamoč, Bosnia and Herzegovina. It has an altitude of 1,907 metres (6,257 ft).

== See also ==
- List of mountains in Bosnia and Herzegovina
