= Mountain river =

River that runs through mountains

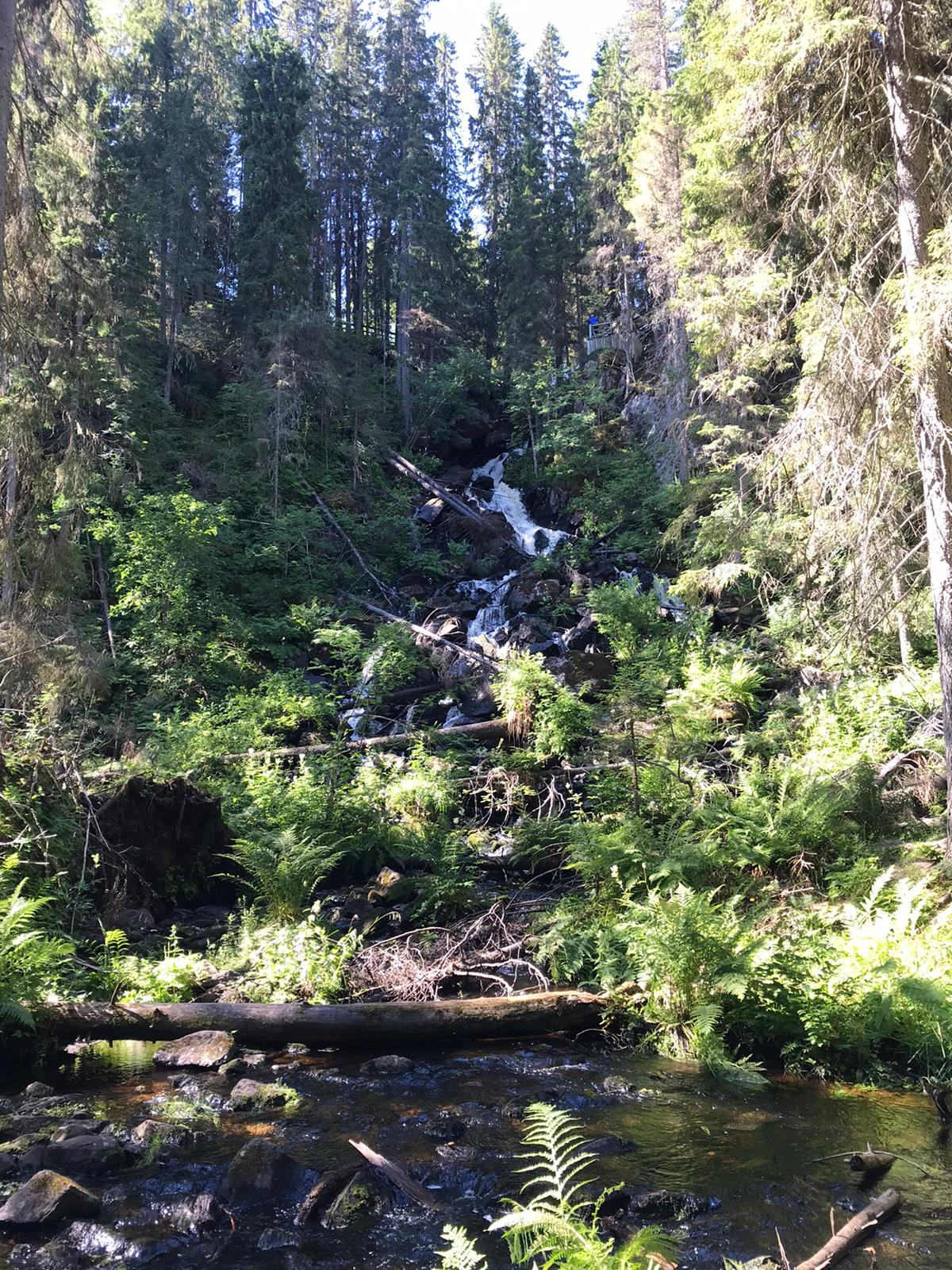
The Korkeakoski rapids of Tuovilanlahti in Maaninka, Kuopio, Finland are formed by a fan-shaped area of jagged rocks.

Mountain rivers are a type of river, which flow in narrow, deep valleys with steep banks, rocky stream beds, and typically accumulated rock debris.

They are characterized by high slope and flow velocity, insignificant depth and frequent rapids and waterfalls. The stream gradient of a mountain river is normally significantly greater than typical rivers.

They play an essential role in shaping the surrounding landscape through erosion and deposition, creating deep valleys, gorges, and waterfalls. Waterfalls are known to contribute to the erosion profile of mountain rivers as the water descends from the mountain.

Pollution by humans has affected mountain rivers and their river ecology, influencing both their bacterial ecosystems as well as temperature due to climate change. Mountain rivers are some of the most vulnerable to increases in temperature, which cause drying that affects the water supply for many people. Since the 2000s, there has been an increase in restoration and rehabilitation of mountain rivers.

== Morphology ==
The channel of a mountain river often changes chaotically as it progresses downstream, changing width and depth significantly both over space and over time as erosion alters the shape of the stream.

Mountain rivers with high flow, either persistently or transiently as the result of annual summer periods of greater flow, typically carrying large sediment greater than 64 millimeters in diameter. The lack of finer sediment can create exceptionally clear water. While mountain water may appear clean, it can still contain a diverse ecosystem of bacteria and viruses, which must be filtered and disinfected to become potable.

== Human uses ==
Mountain rivers play a significant role in providing water for agricultural and urban use. As of 2011, up to 80% of US drinking water originated from mountain snow. Increases in population has spurred settlement into mountainous areas, influencing the local ecology and contributing to deforestation.

== See also ==
- Upland and lowland (freshwater ecology)
- Category:Rivers by mountain range
