= Donji Ribnik =

Coordinates: 44.4550°N 16.8328°E

Donji Ribnik Доњи Рибник
- Village
- Location within Republika Srpska
- Country: Bosnia and Herzegovina
- Entity: Republika Srpska
- Municipality: Ribnik

Population
  - Total: 435
- Time zone: UTC+1 (CET)
  - Summer (DST): UTC+2 (CEST)

Donji Ribnik (Serbian Cyrillic: Доњи Рибник) is a village in the municipality of Ribnik, Republika Srpska, Bosnia and Herzegovina.
