= Cerovica =

Cerovica can refer to the following places:

Bosnia and Herzegovina

- Cerovica, Neum
- Cerovica (Bosanski Novi)
- Cerovica (Stanari)

Serbia

- Cerovica (Kučevo)
- Cerovica (Sokobanja)

Slovenia

- Cerovica, Šmartno pri Litiji

Croatia

- Cerovica, Samobor
- Cerovica (Istria)
