= Čađavica =

Čađavica may refer to:

- Čađavica, Croatia, a municipality in Croatia
- Čađavica, Bijeljina, a town in Bosnia and Herzegovina
- Čađavica (Drava), a tributary to the Drava in Slavonia
- Čađavica, a headwater of the Likodra near Krupanj, Serbia
- Čađavica Donja (Bosanski Novi)
- Čađavica Gornja (Bosanski Novi)
- Čađavica Srednja (Bosanski Novi)
