= 373rd (Croatian) Infantry Division =

German army infantry division

- German: 373. (Kroatische) Infanterie-Division
- The badge worn on the right upper sleeve by members of the division
- Active: 1 June 1943 – 10 May 1945
- Country: Germany
- Branch: Army
- Type: Infantry
- Role: Anti-Partisan operations
- Size: Division (around 12,000)
- Nickname(s): Tiger Division
- Engagements: World War II; Operation Panther; Operation Ristow; Battle of Banja Luka; Operation Morgenstern; Operation Rösselsprung; Battle of Knin; Lika-Primorje operation

Commanders
- Notable commanders: Emil Zellner; Eduard Aldrian; Hans-Joachim Gravenstein

The 373rd (Croatian) Infantry Division (German: 373. (Kroatische) Infanterie-Division, Croatian: 373. (hrvatska) pješačka divizija) was a division of the German Army during World War II. It was formed in June 1943 using a brigade from the Home Guard of the Independent State of Croatia (Croatian: Nezavisna Država Hrvatska, NDH) with the addition of a German cadre. The division was commanded by Germans down to battalion and even company level in nearly all cases, and was commonly referred to as a "legionnaire division". Originally formed with the intention of service on the Eastern Front, it was used instead for anti-Partisan operations in the territory of the NDH until the end of the war. It fought mainly in the western areas of the NDH, and was involved in the attempt to kill or capture the leader of the Partisans, Josip Broz Tito, in May 1944. Severely depleted by desertion, the division withdrew towards the Reich border in the early months of 1945, eventually surrendering to the Partisans on 10 May 1945 near Brežice in modern-day Slovenia.

== History ==
=== Formation ===
After the Axis invasion of the Soviet Union in June 1941, Ante Pavelić, the leader of the newly created Axis puppet state the Independent State of Croatia (NDH), offered Adolf Hitler volunteers to serve on the Eastern Front. This offer soon resulted in the formation and deployment of army, air force and naval detachments which, after being trained and equipped by Germany, were committed to fighting the Red Army. The largest element was the 369th Croatian Reinforced Infantry Regiment, which was part of the 100th Jäger Division, but was decimated at Stalingrad in January 1943. The Croatian forces performed creditably on the Eastern Front, and the Germans continued to support the development of NDH forces with the aim of raising several divisions to serve there. Due to the lack of trained leaders and staff, these divisions were raised using a German cadre.

The 373rd (Croatian) Infantry Division was assembled and trained in Stockerau and Döllersheim, Austria, commencing from the end of January 1943 as the second Croatian division raised for service in the Wehrmacht, following its sister formation, the 369th (Croatian) Infantry Division. It was built around a cadre of 3,500 German troops, and 8,500 soldiers of the 7th Mountain Brigade of the Croatian Home Guard, the regular army of the NDH. It was established with two infantry regiments of three battalions each. Each regiment was allocated the manpower from two of the four battalions of the 7th Mountain Brigade. It was formed under the command of Generalmajor (Brigadier) Emil Zellner, with the Knight's Cross of the Iron Cross recipient Oberst (Colonel) Alois Windisch commanding the 383rd (Croatian) Grenadier Regiment and Oberst Boicetta commanding the 384th (Croatian) Grenadier Regiment. All battalions were commanded by Germans except for the reconnaissance battalion, which was commanded by a Croat officer, Major Bakarec. The Croatian divisions that served in the Wehrmacht were commonly known as "legionnaire divisions".

Although originally intended for use on the Eastern Front, the division did not deploy there and returned to the NDH in May 1943 due to the need to combat the communist-led Partisans in the territory of the NDH. The division left its training area in Austria over the period 1–12 May 1943, travelling by train via the route Vienna–Graz–Marburg–Zagreb. It was known as the "Tiger Division" (Croatian: Tigar Divizija), and was subordinated to the Croatia Command (German: Befehlshaber Kroatien) of General der Infanterie (Lieutenant General) Rudolf Lüters.

=== 1943 ===
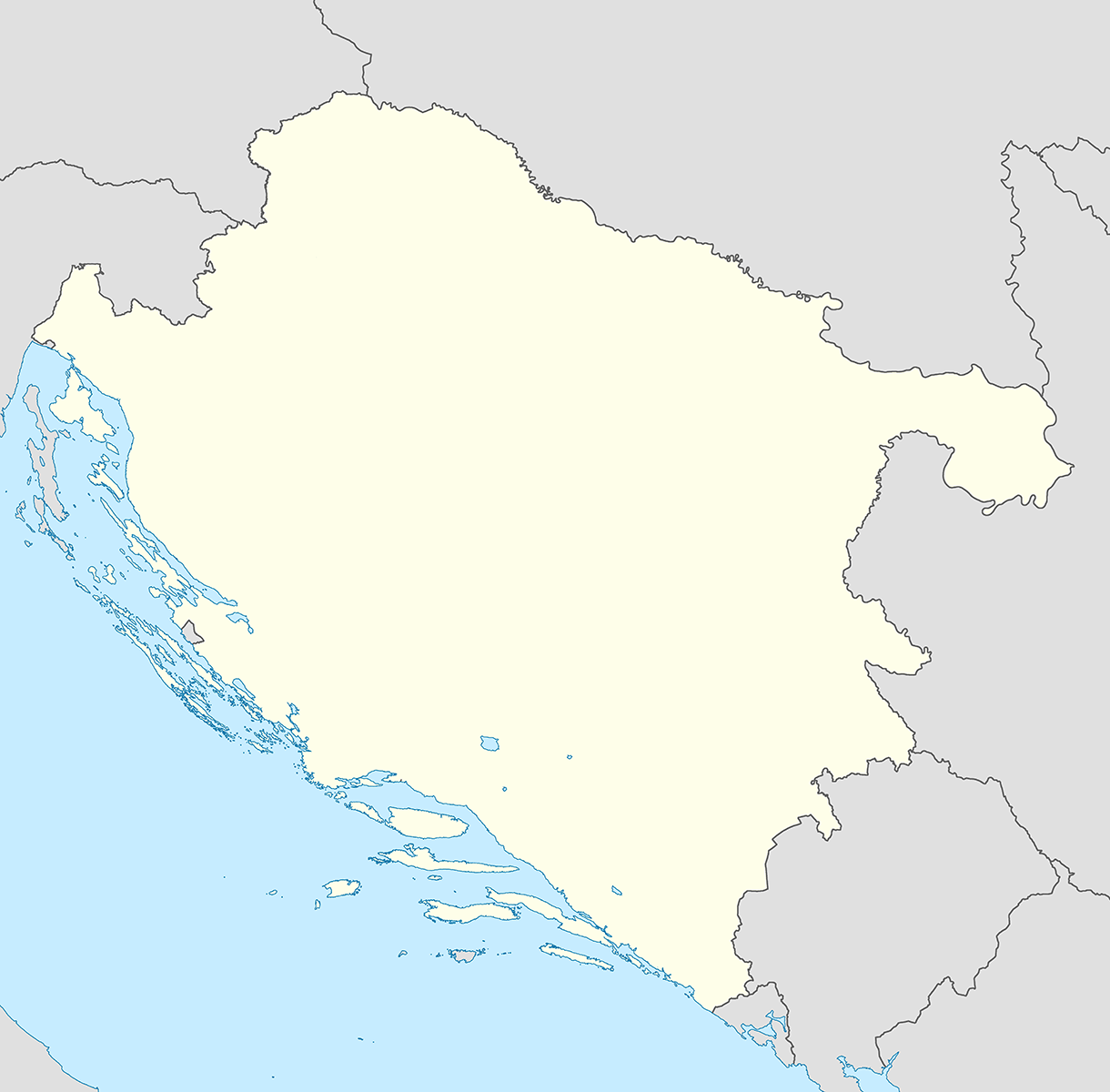
Map of the Independent State of Croatia showing divisional headquarters locations during 1943

==== Initial tasks ====
The first task of the division was to secure the area north and northwest of Mostar, which contained important bauxite reserves needed for the German war effort. The divisional headquarters was established in Bugojno with the regimental headquarters of the 383rd at Lise, and the 384th at Travnik. At the end of May, one battalion (III/383) and supporting artillery were deployed to Mostar to replace Italian forces. For the first few weeks the division had only minor contacts with Partisan forces, but by mid-June the division began sending out strong Jagdkommandos, lightly armed and mobile "hunter teams" of company or battalion strength, to break up and harass Partisans operating in the divisional area of responsibility. In early July, a search and destroy operation was conducted west of the Kupres–Bugojno–Jajce road, during which local Chetnik units began cooperating with the division. On 5 July, Bakarec summoned the inhabitants of a village and shot six captured Partisans in front of them. The division lost 23 killed during this operation. Following the conclusion of this sweep, the division moved north, and its headquarters redeployed to Prijedor.

Throughout July and August 1943 the division patrolled constantly and fought minor engagements in its area of responsibility. On 5 August 1943, Generalleutnant (Major General) Eduard Aldrian became divisional commander replacing Zellner, who was transferred to the Army Headquarters officers' reserve pool (German: Oberkommando des Heeres Führerreserve). On 16 August, Oberstleutnant (Lieutenant Colonel) Mück replaced Windisch as commander of the 383rd Regiment, and the division was placed under the command of the 2nd Panzer Army, which had been redeployed to the Balkans from the Eastern Front. Over the period 18–22 August, 102 Croat and Bosnian Muslim soldiers deserted, ten of whom were later arrested. There were a range of factors encouraging desertion, including Partisan propaganda and infiltration, the influence of the Croatian Peasant Party, and reverses suffered by the Germans in North Africa and at Stalingrad and elsewhere on the Eastern Front.

==== Combat intensifies ====
In late August and early September 1943, the division redeployed again, this time to Bihać, relieving the 114th Jäger Division which redeployed to the Adriatic coast. The move was difficult, with several significant ambushes resulting in numerous casualties and the loss of several vehicles and guns.

In September, it was placed under the command of the newly formed XV Mountain Corps led by Lüters. That month, the division concluded a collaboration agreement with the 260-strong Chetnik detachment of Mane Rokvić, who was in control of an area which included parts of both western Bosnia and Lika. The division utilised the Chetniks to protect railway lines and key industries in their area, as well as for scouting against the Partisans and attacks on the rear of Partisan formations. Desertions worsened particularly after the capitulation of Italy in early September 1943. For example, during October 1943, 334 men deserted from the division. It handled thousands of Italian prisoners in the aftermath of the surrender, feeding them and marching them under guard towards the Reich.

On 20 October 1943, the Germans formally confirmed that the division would not be utilised outside the NDH. In the second half of October 1943, Partisan forces surrounded the Croatian Home Guard garrison of Prijedor. The 383rd Regiment relieved the garrison and conducted clearing operations around the town until heavy snowfalls in the first week in November. On 4 December, Oberstleutnant Hühnewaldt replaced Mück as the commander of that regiment.

==== Operations Panther and Ristow ====
Between 10 and 24 December 1943, the division, along with the 371st Infantry Division and the 1st Cossack Division, participated in Operation Panther. The aim of the operation was to encircle Partisan forces located within the Kostajnica forest and the area north of Bosanski Novi. The operation achieved little, and was immediately followed by Operation Ristow. The objective of this operation was to clear the area south of the Sana river between Bosanski Novi and Prijedor, and destroy elements of the Partisan 7th Banija Division, which intelligence indicated were planning to establish winter quarters in the vicinity of Maslovare village, with the river Japra protecting their rear. The division committed the 383rd Infantry Regiment, reinforced by three tanks of the 202nd Panzer Battalion, and supported by the guns of I. Battalion, 373rd Artillery Regiment. The plan involved a three-day operation commencing on 24 December. Following up reconnaissance by the Croatian 3rd Mountain Brigade, the objective of the first day was to thrust 10 kilometres (6.2 mi) eastward from Bosanski Novi to secure heights east of the Japra, and this was achieved against light resistance.

The following day saw heavy fighting before the German force secured their objectives, suffering ten wounded in the process. After mopping up on 26 December, orders were issued for I. Battalion to continue the advance south of the Sana towards the village of Trgovište, while II. Battalion was ordered to cross the Sana on rafts and continue the advance on the northern side of the river. On the morning of 27 December, I. Battalion successfully advanced to a point about 10 kilometres (6.2 mi) west of Prijedor, and occupied Trgovište. Advancing further east, I. Battalion lost formation and suffered heavy attacks from Partisan forces who also infiltrated between the companies and attacked their flanks and rear. The entire force, less two companies and the tanks which remained north of the river, consolidated on heights south of the Sana, and throughout the night fought off several large Partisan assaults which were supported by heavy mortar fire. On 28 December, the German force fought its way to the south bank of the Sana, and evacuated its casualties across the river on rafts. The main body then fought its way east to Prijedor with covering fire provided by the two companies and tanks remaining on the northern bank, with the majority arriving on 29 December. Operation Ristow was very costly for the division, with I. Battalion alone suffering 100 casualties, mainly from mortar fire on the night of 27/28 December. Information from the local population indicated that the Partisans lost at least 76 dead during the operation.

=== 1944 ===
==== Battle of Banja Luka ====
In late December 1943, Hühnewaldt was tasked with the defence of Banja Luka, the second largest city in Bosnia, which had been under Partisan pressure for several days. The headquarters of XV Mountain Corps was in Banja Luka, along with the divisional replacement battalion, divisional support troops, some police and a few tanks. Elements of the 4th Jäger Brigade of the Croatian Home Guard were also in the city. On 31 December, Hühnewaldt deployed I/383 to Banja Luka to further bolster the defences. At 23:00 that day, a heavy artillery and mortar bombardment started, followed by a Partisan attack that quickly overran the Home Guard outposts and engaged the divisional units in heavy fighting. At first light on New Year's Day, I/383 counterattacked, recapturing the crucial power station. That evening the Partisans renewed their assault, overrunning the hospital and massacring the German sick and wounded, and capturing the railway station. By this point the defenders were concentrated in two blocks of the town centre and the Partisans were only 100 metres (330 ft) away. A desperate but unsuccessful counterattack was mounted, and the city appeared lost when the force was relieved by the 901st Panzergrenadier Lehr Regiment. The Partisans quickly withdrew and the Ustaše Militia and Sicherheitsdienst (Security Police) subsequently executed all armed personnel captured in the city. Those killed during the battle included 67 Germans, 150 Croatian Home Guard and between 300 and 350 Partisans.

Following the battle, the division cleared and secured the area around Banja Luka, and in February 1944 Hühnewaldt was replaced as commander of the 383rd Regiment by Major Ristow of I/383. At the end of March, most of the 383rd Regiment was deployed to Knin with responsibility for the road between Knin and Bihać, with the regimental commander designated as the commander of the garrison. In the latter task, it was assisted by the 7th SS Volunteer Mountain Division Prinz Eugen. From 7 to 16 May 1944, the division participated in Operation Morgenstern (Morning Star) in the Krbavsko Polje region west and southwest of Bihać, along with elements of its sister formation, the 392nd (Croatian) Infantry Division, the 92nd Motorised Regiment, the 1st Jäger Regiment of the Panzergrenadier Division Brandenburg, and Ustaše units. The operation was a significant success, killing 438 Partisans and capturing 56, along with large quantities of arms, ammunition, vehicles and supplies.

==== Operation Rösselsprung ====
The division formed a significant part of the ground force used by XV Mountain Corps in Operation Rösselsprung, which was launched on 25 May 1944, with the objectives of killing or capturing the Partisan leader Josip Broz Tito, and destroying his headquarters at Drvar. The division was responsible for two of the nine coordinated thrusts converging on the Partisan stronghold in the Drvar-Bosanski Petrovac area. The first thrust consisted of the 384th (Croatian) Infantry Regiment, referred to as Kampfgruppe Willam after its commander. The 384th Regiment group was to advance east at 5 am on 25 May from the village of Srb towards Drvar. Kampfgruppe Willam had the primary responsibility for relieving then taking command of 500th SS Parachute Battalion who would land by parachute and glider in Drvar on 25 May, and the regiment was then to attack in the direction of Bosanski Petrovac. The second thrust consisted of a battalion group from the division, which was to set out at 5 am on 25 May from Lapac and drive east through Kulen Vakuf to capture the crossroads at Vrtoče. If necessary, they were then to advance north-west towards Bihać to open the road.

Throughout 25 May, the ground forces of XV Mountain Corps were not able to advance as quickly as expected. There was unexpected resistance from strong Partisan forces along their axes of advance, and there was very poor communication between the various elements which resulted in lack of coordination of their movements. They were also subjected to several Allied air attacks. In the meantime, Tito and his key staff escaped to the south and were flown to Italy. Kampfgruppe Willam was unable to overcome the resistance of the 2nd Lika Brigade, and to force its way through to Drvar until the paratroopers had been relieved around midday on 26 May by a stronger column attacking from the direction of Bihać. On 29 May the battalion group from the division attacked strong Partisan positions east, north and northwest of Prekaja, but the attack was held up by a lack of ammunition. The attack was renewed on 31 May after new orders had been issued, with the division occupying the Prekaja area and capturing two Partisan tanks. Operation Rösselsprung was a failure as Tito and his principal headquarters staff escaped.

=== Final months ===
In the autumn of 1944, the division absorbed the 2nd Jäger Brigade of the Croatian Home Guard as its third regiment, renamed the 385th (Croatian) Infantry Regiment. On 20 October, Knight's Cross recipient Oberst der Reserves Dipl.-Ing. Karl Hermann, commander of the Grenadier Regiment 384 (Croatian), replaced Aldrian, and was in turn replaced by Oberst Hans-Joachim Gravenstein on 18 November. On 6 December 1944, the division participated in the defence of Knin against the Partisans, where it suffered serious losses. On 15 January with effect from 1 January 1945, Gravenstein was promoted to Generalmajor, and withdrew the survivors of the division to the northwest towards Bihać. During this withdrawal, the division assisted the 6,000–7,000 Chetniks of Momčilo Đujić that had fought alongside them at Knin and accompanied them towards Bihać. Later that month, a large number of Croats from the division deserted to join the Partisans during the attack of the 35th Lika Division. This trend continued, with a further two companies of Croat soldiers deserting.

The division saw action against the Partisans until the end of the war. However, by April 1945 a large part of its Croatian manpower had been lost or released, with the Croatian elements only numbering between 2,000 and 3,000 soldiers. During the last few months of the war, it fought in northern Dalmatia and parts of Lika and Kordun during Lika-Primorje operation and later in Banija. When the Partisans launched their spring offensive on 20 March 1945, it fought the Partisan 2nd Army as it advanced on Zagreb. The division withdrew from Gospić via Donji Lapac, Bosanska Krupa, Bosanski Novi and Kostajnica where most of its remaining Croatian soldiers were separated out from the German elements and probably dispersed. The remainder continued its withdrawal via Sunja, Sisak and Zagreb to Brežice in modern-day Slovenia, where it surrendered to the Partisans at the village of Raka on 10 May 1945, and the remaining Croat soldiers left the division. The division's disarmed German troops were allowed to travel towards Germany for several days before becoming prisoners of war of the Partisans. Gravenstein was tried in a show trial in Belgrade by the Yugoslav authorities on 5 April 1947 and was executed on 3 May 1947.

== Organisational history ==
The initial composition of the division was:

- 383rd (Croatian) Grenadier Regiment (I, II, III battalions)
- 384th (Croatian) Grenadier Regiment (I, II, III battalions)
- 373rd Artillery Regiment (I, II, III battalions)
- 373rd Fusilier Battalion
- 373rd Reconnaissance Battalion
- 373rd Pioneer Battalion
- 373rd Signals Battalion
- 373rd Division Support Units

In autumn 1944 the division absorbed the 2nd Jäger Brigade of the Croatian Home Guard, which created a third infantry regiment, the 385th (Croatian) Grenadier Regiment.

== Commanding officers ==
The following officers commanded the division:

- Generalmajor then from 1 April 1943 Generalleutnant Emil Zellner, 25 January 1943 – 5 August 1943
- Generalleutnant Eduard Aldrian, 5 August 1943 – 20 October 1944
- Oberst der Reserves Karl Hermann, 20 October 1944 – 14 November 1944
- Oberst then from 1 January 1945 Generalmajor Hans Gravenstein, 14 November 1944 – May 1945

== See also ==
- Resistance during World War II
- Anti-partisan operations in World War II
