= Hozići =

Hozići may refer to:

- Hozići, Novi Grad, a village in Bosnia and Herzegovina
- Hozići, Glamoč, a village in Bosnia and Herzegovina
