= Petkovac =

Petkovac may refer to:

- Petkovac, Bosnia and Herzegovina, a village in Bosnia
- Petkovac, Croatia, a village near Petrinja, Croatia
