= Suhača =

Suhača may refer to:

- Suhača (Novi Grad), a village in Bosnia and Herzegovina
- Suhača, Livno, a village in Bosnia and Herzegovina
