= Oste Erceg =

Bosnian painter (1947–2025)

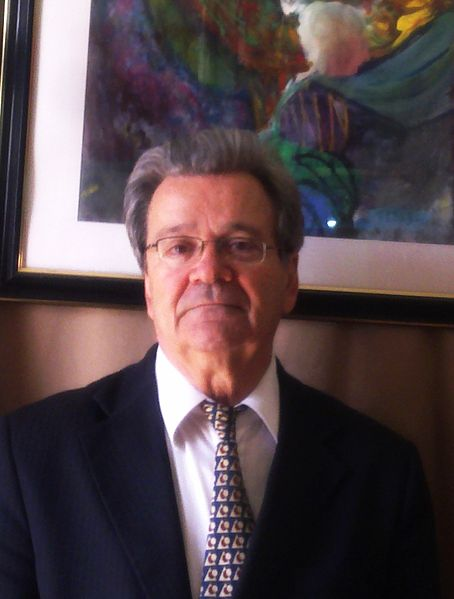
- Erceg in 2013, by Neven Djenadija
- Born: 23 March 1947; Gornji Rakani, Novi Grad, PR Bosnia and Herzegovina, FPR Yugoslavia
- Died: 4 June 2025 (aged 78)
- Education: Boško Karanović
- Known for: Painting, drawing
- Notable work: Cherry (1980), Dawn in Rakani (1988), Rough horizon (2006), Sooty horn (2010), Father (2008)
- Awards: Purchase awards at Novi Grad Art Salon in 1987. 1988. and in 1989.
- Patrons: Lazar Drljaca, Stojan Celic, Djoko Mazalic

Oste Erceg (Serbian: [Осте Ерцег]; 23 March 1947 – 4 June 2025) was a Bosnian Serb painter from Novi Grad, Bosnia and Herzegovina.

== Biography ==
Erceg was born in Gornji Rakani, where he completed elementary and high school, graduating in 1966. He began painting in 1967, while studying at the College of Textile-Chemical School in Zagreb, from which he graduated in 1972. In 1973, Erceg began working as an engineer in the textile industry. In 1986, he enrolled in a painting course at the Academy of Arts in Belgrade, which he attended until 1990.

Erceg died on 4 June 2025 at the age of 78.

== Work ==
Erceg was notable for producing all his work as fingerpainting. His work focuses largely on his homeland of Gornji Rakani, and his memories of the war in Bosnia and Herzegovina. His oeuvre comprises 300 works, of which 100 have been sold to collectors from Australia to the Americas.

== Reception ==
In her book Slikano perom art historian Danka Damjanović describes Erceg as a painter who developed his talent and style in isolation from other artists, who painted with emotion and expression as a means of cleansing and self-realization.

Academician Enver Mandžić attributes Erceg's sense of color to his training as a textile dyeing engineer. On Erceg's portraiture, Mandžić says "In every one of his portraits, we can discover those deep emotional traits that are immortalized in the spirit of artists and models."

== Exhibitions ==
Solo exhibitions

- 1994 Gallery Heritage Museum, Novi Grad
- 1994 Museum "King Peter Mrkonjića" Mrkonjić Grad
- 2000 Gallery Heritage Museum, Novi Grad
- 2006 Bosnian Cultural Center, Tuzla
- 2009 Gallery Prijedor, Prijedor
- 2011 Gallery Prijedor, Prijedor
- 2012 of the Assembly Hall, Kostajnica
- 2015 Gallery Bihać, Bihać
- 2015 Gallery of cultural center, Gradiska
- 2016 Gallery Heritage Museum, Novi Grad
- 2018 1st mutual exhibition of Oste Erceg and Sanja Kuliš Kostajnica

Group exhibitions

- 1985 Gallery Heritage Museum, Novi Grad Art Salon Novi Grad
- 1986 Gallery Heritage Museum, Novi Grad Art Salon Novi Grad
- 1987 Gallery Heritage Museum, Novi Grad Art Salon Novi Grad
- 1988 Gallery Heritage Museum, Novi Grad Art Salon Novi Grad
- 1989 Gallery Heritage Museum, Novi Grad Art Salon Novi Grad
- 2005 3rd Biennial art miniatures BiH Tuzla, Sarajevo, Mostar, Bihać,
- 2007 4th Biennial art miniatures BiH Tuzla, Brčko, Sarajevo, Bihać
- 2009 5th Biennial art miniatures BiH Tuzla, Brčko, Sarajevo, Bihać
- 2011 6th Biennial art miniatures BiH Tuzla, Brčko, Sarajevo, Bihać
- 2013 7th Biennial art miniatures BiH Tuzla
- 2014 12th International biennial art miniatures Gornji Milanovac
- 2014 5th International exhibition "Art in miniatures" Majdanpek, Beograd
- 2015 8th Biennial art miniatures BiH Tuzla, Brčko, Sarajevo
- 2015 2nd International exhibition "Moslavina miniatures" Popovaca, Knin, Petrinja
- 2015 6th International exhibition "Art in miniatures" Majdanpek, Beograd
- 2015 14th International Art Colony for children of the center "Duga" Bihać
- 2015 13th International biennial art miniatures Gornji Milanovac
- 2016 7th International exhibition "Art in miniatures" Majdanpek, Beograd
- 2017 3rd International exhibition "Moslavina miniatures" Croatia
- 2017 8th International exhibition "Art in miniatures" Majdanpek, Beograd, Petrovac na Mlavi
- 2017 9th Biennial art miniatures BiH Tuzla
- 2017 4th International exhibition "Moslavina miniatures" Croatia, Popovača
- 2017 1st Art exhibition "Piralo" Kostajnica
- 2018 5th International exhibition "Moslavina miniatures" Croatia, Popovača
- 2019 10th International exhibition "Art in miniatures" MajdanArt Majdanpek, Srbija
- 2019 1st Festival of art "ArtNovum" Novi Grad Republic of Srpska Novi Grad
- 2019 10th Biennial art miniatures BiH Tuzla
- 2019 6th International exhibition "Moslavina" Croatia, Popovača
- 2023 10th Group paintings exhibition "10 godina s Vama" Ludvig dizajn Croatia, Zagreb

== Awards ==
- 2018 5th International exhibition "Moslavina miniatures" Croatia - One of three equal awards.

== Gallery ==
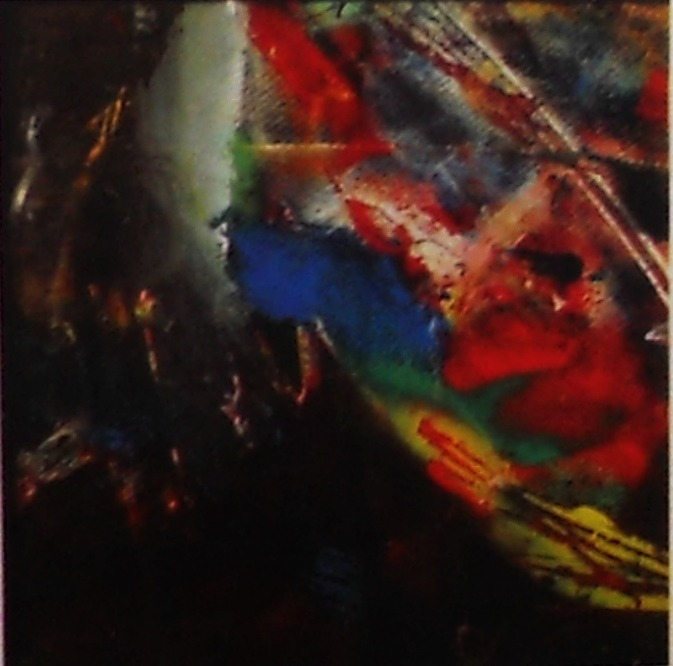
Soopy horn, 2010th, oil on cardboard, Owner: Private gallery "GM" Tuzla

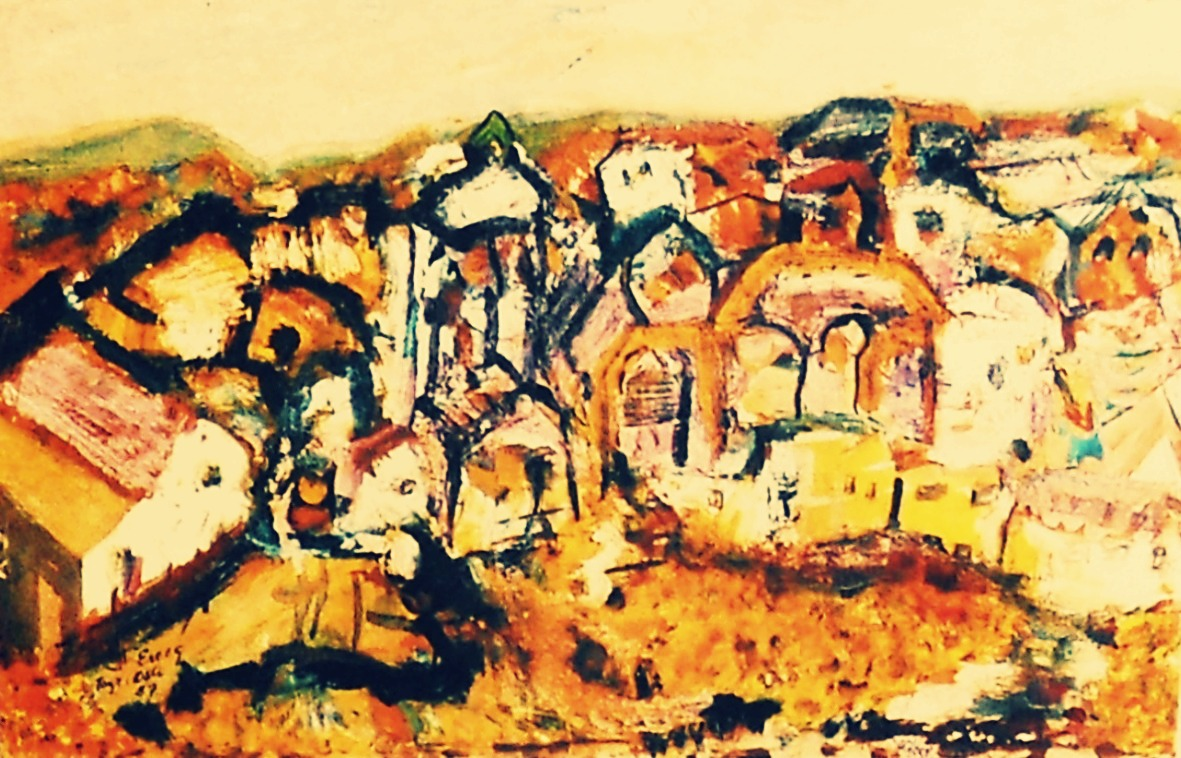
Supetar on Brac, 1987th, oil on cardboard, Owners: Davor Rukavina and Tatjana Rukavina Erceg

== Personal ==
Erceg was married and lived in Novi Grad. He had two daughters and owned a jewelry shop in Kostajnica.
