= Church of St. Nicholas, Dobrljin =

Church of St. Nicholas
- Црква светог Николе; Crkva svetog Nikole
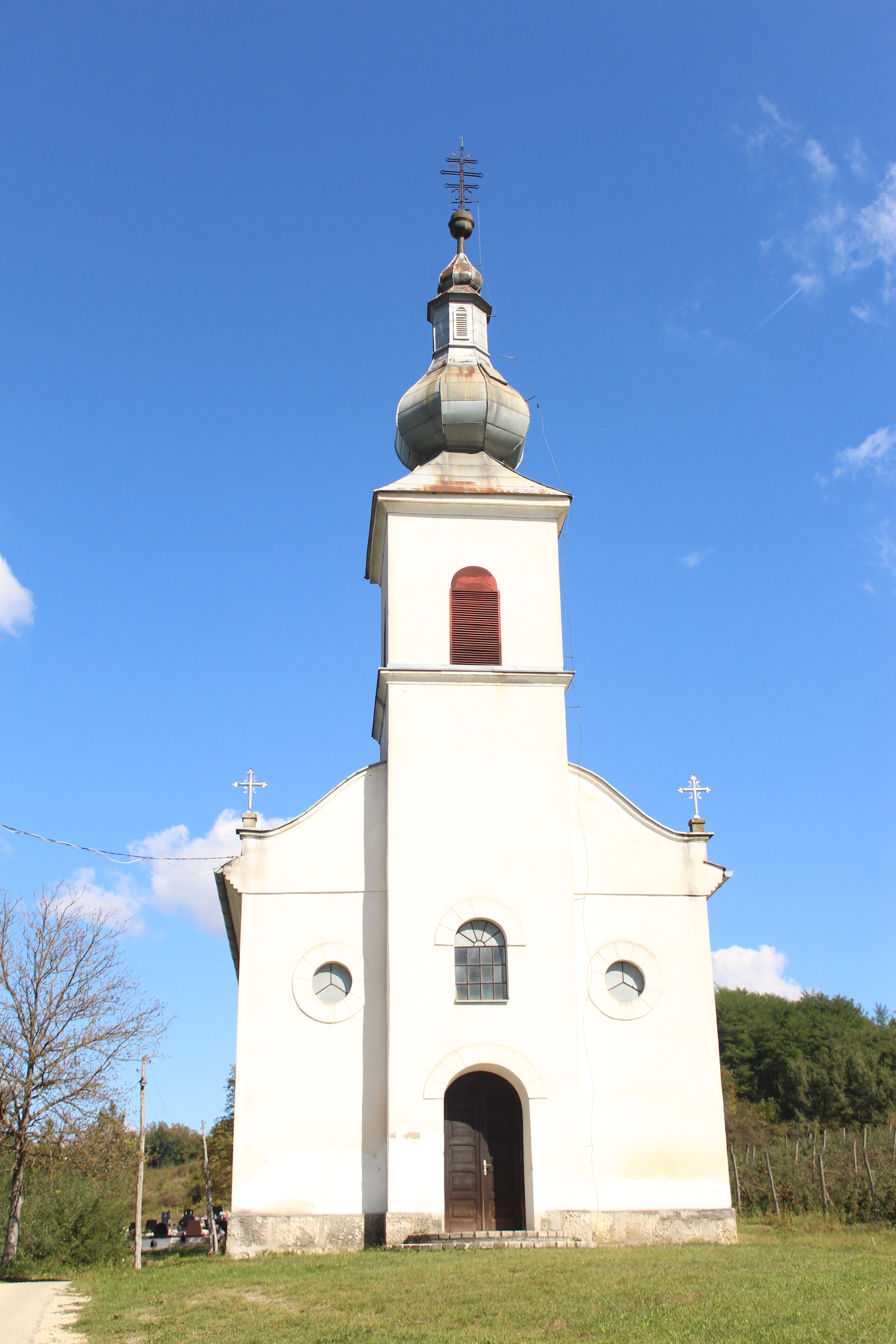
- Church of St Nicholas
- Church of St. Nicholas
- 45°08′34″N 16°28′51″E
- Location: Dobrljin, Republika Srpska
- Country: Bosnia and Herzegovina
- Denomination: Serbian Orthodox

History
- Status: Church
- Dedication: St. Nicholas

Architecture
- Functional status: Active
- Style: Neo-classicism

Administration
- Archdiocese: Eparchy of Banja Luka

The Church of St. Nicholas (Serbian: Црква светог Николе) in Dobrljin is Serbian Orthodox church in Republika Srpska, Bosnia and Herzegovina. The building was constructed at the site of older wooden church. The local Serbian Orthodox parish is one of the oldest parishes in the municipality of Novi Grad with the current building being over 130 years old as reported in 2022. The church together with local orthodox population and priest were targeted during the Genocide of Serbs in the Independent State of Croatia when local priest Aleksa Popović was forced by Ustashe to personally demolish the monument to Peter I of Serbia before he was driven to the forced labour camp in Koprivnica. Active religious services at the site were reinitiated only in 1996.

== See also ==
- Eparchy of Banja Luka
