= Rasce =

Rasce may refer to:

- Rašće, Bosnia and Herzegovina
- Rašče, North Macedonia
