= Donji Agići =

- Village
- Location within Bosnia and Herzegovina
- Coordinates: 44°56′51″N 16°27′19″E
- Country: Bosnia and Herzegovina
- Entity: Republika Srpska
- Municipality: Novi Grad
- Time zone: UTC+1 (CET)
  - Summer (DST): UTC+2 (CEST)

Donji Agići (Serbian Cyrillic: Доњи Агићи) is a village in the municipality of Novi Grad, Republika Srpska, Bosnia and Herzegovina.
