= Kršlje =

Kršlje Кршље
- Village
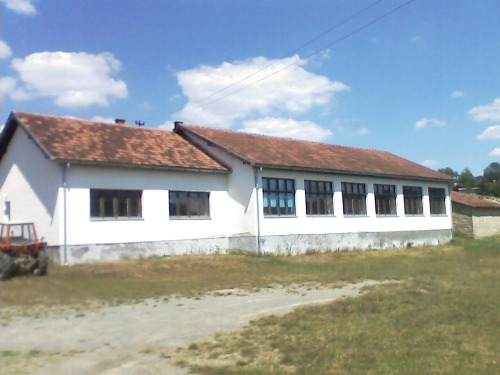
- Elementary School in Kršlje

- Location within Bosnia and Herzegovina
- Coordinates: 44°55′48″N 16°24′36″E
- Country: Bosnia and Herzegovina
- Entity: Republika Srpska
- Municipality: Novi Grad
- Time zone: UTC+1 (CET)
  - Summer (DST): UTC+2 (CEST)

Kršlje (Serbian Cyrillic: Кршље) is a village in Novi Grad, Republika Srpska, Bosnia and Herzegovina. There are about 600 people who mostly depend on agriculture.

== Geography ==
The village consists of four smaller units and these are: Avramović, Osredak, Bukovica, and Brda Bjeljčeva. There are two small rivers Velika (Large) Japra and Mala (Small) Japra, and they merge to one river Japra. The largest stream, which completely belongs to village, is the stream Bukovica. Altitude of village is around 150–300 metres. Neighbor villages are: Čađavica, Vedovica, Mala Novska Rujiška, Ćele, Gornji Agići, Donji Agići, Hozići, and Suhača. The distance between Kršlje and Novi Grad is around 25 km.

== Education ==
In the middle of village there is an elementary school for children from first to fifth grade. It is a part of Elementary School "Branko Ćopić", which is located in Donji Agići. The students of older grades attend classes in this school or Elementary School "Sveti Sava" from Novi Grad, which is located in Mala Novska Rujiška. High schools are located in Novi Grad. There is also the Orthodox Church of Cyril and Methodius 700 m from school.

== Economy ==
There is one store in the village: STR "Božo", and one caffe bar: Caffe bar "Ivana". There is small number of people from village who works in public jobs. One of them is Milanko Mihajlica, president of Serbian Radical Party of the Republika Srpska.

== Population ==
Kršlje
Year	1991	1981	1971
Serbs	617 (97.62%)	698 (95.61%)	959 (97.95%)
Bosniaks	10 (1,58%)	19 (2,60%)	19 (1,94%)
Croats	0	1 (0.13%)	1 (0.10%)
Yugoslavs	1 (0.15%)	12 (1.64%)	0
Others	4 (0.63%)	0	0
Total	632	730	979
