= Mazić =

- Village
- Location within Bosnia and Herzegovina
- Coordinates: 45°04′00″N 16°26′07″E
- Country: Bosnia and Herzegovina
- Entity: Republika Srpska
- Municipality: Novi Grad
- Time zone: UTC+1 (CET)
  - Summer (DST): UTC+2 (CEST)

Mazić (Cyrillic: Мазић) is a village in the municipality of Novi Grad, Republika Srpska, Bosnia and Herzegovina.
