= Mala Žuljevica =

Mala Žuljevica Мала Жуљевица
- Village
- Location within Bosnia and Herzegovina
- Coordinates: 45°04′42″N 16°26′55″E
- Country: Bosnia and Herzegovina
- Entity: Republika Srpska
- Municipality: Novi Grad
- Time zone: UTC+1 (CET)
  - Summer (DST): UTC+2 (CEST)

Mala Žuljevica (Cyrillic: Мала Жуљевица) is a village in the municipality of Novi Grad, Republika Srpska, Bosnia and Herzegovina.
