= Rakovac (Novi Grad) =

Rakovac Раковац
- Village
- Location within Bosnia and Herzegovina
- Country: Bosnia and Herzegovina
- Entity: Republika Srpska
- Municipality: Novi Grad
- Time zone: UTC+1 (CET)
  - Summer (DST): UTC+2 (CEST)

Rakovac (Serbian: Раковац) is a village in the municipality of Novi Grad, Republika Srpska, Bosnia and Herzegovina.
