= Velika Rujiška =

- Village
- Location within Bosnia and Herzegovina
- Coordinates: 44°55′42″N 16°19′02″E
- Country: Bosnia and Herzegovina
- Entity: Republika Srpska
- Municipality: Novi Grad
- Time zone: UTC+1 (CET)
  - Summer (DST): UTC+2 (CEST)

Velika Rujiška (Cyrillic: Велика Рујишка) is a village in the municipality of Novi Grad, Republika Srpska, Bosnia and Herzegovina.
