= Prusci =

- Village
- Location within Bosnia and Herzegovina
- Coordinates: 45°05′12″N 16°32′19″E
- Country: Bosnia and Herzegovina
- Entity: Republika Srpska
- Municipality: Novi Grad
- Time zone: UTC+1 (CET)
  - Summer (DST): UTC+2 (CEST)

Prusci (Cyrillic: Прусци) is a village in the municipality of Novi Grad, Republika Srpska, Bosnia and Herzegovina.
