= Sokolište =

Sokolište Соколиште
- Village
- Location within Bosnia and Herzegovina
- Coordinates: 45°00′N 16°28′E
- Country: Bosnia and Herzegovina
- Entity: Republika Srpska
- Municipality: Novi Grad

Population (2013)
  - Total: 442
- Time zone: UTC+1 (CET)
  - Summer (DST): UTC+2 (CEST)

Sokolište (Serbian Cyrillic: Соколиште) is a village in the municipality of Novi Grad, Republika Srpska, Bosnia and Herzegovina.
