= Donje Vodičevo =

- Village
- Location within Bosnia and Herzegovina
- Coordinates: 45°07′02″N 16°27′36″E
- Country: Bosnia and Herzegovina
- Entity: Republika Srpska
- Municipality: Novi Grad
- Time zone: UTC+1 (CET)
  - Summer (DST): UTC+2 (CEST)

Donje Vodičevo (Cyrillic: Доње Водичево) is a village in the municipality of Novi Grad, Republika Srpska, Bosnia and Herzegovina.
