= Ravnice, Bosnia and Herzegovina =

Ravnice Равнице
- Village
- Interactive map of Ravnice
- Location within Bosnia and Herzegovina
- Coordinates: 45°6′32″N 16°24′42″E
- Country: Bosnia and Herzegovina
- Entity: Republika Srpska
- Municipality: Novi Grad
- Time zone: UTC+1 (CET)
  - Summer (DST): UTC+2 (CEST)

Ravnice (Cyrillic: Равнице) is a village in the municipality of Novi Grad, Republika Srpska, Bosnia and Herzegovina.
