= Dobrljin =

- Village
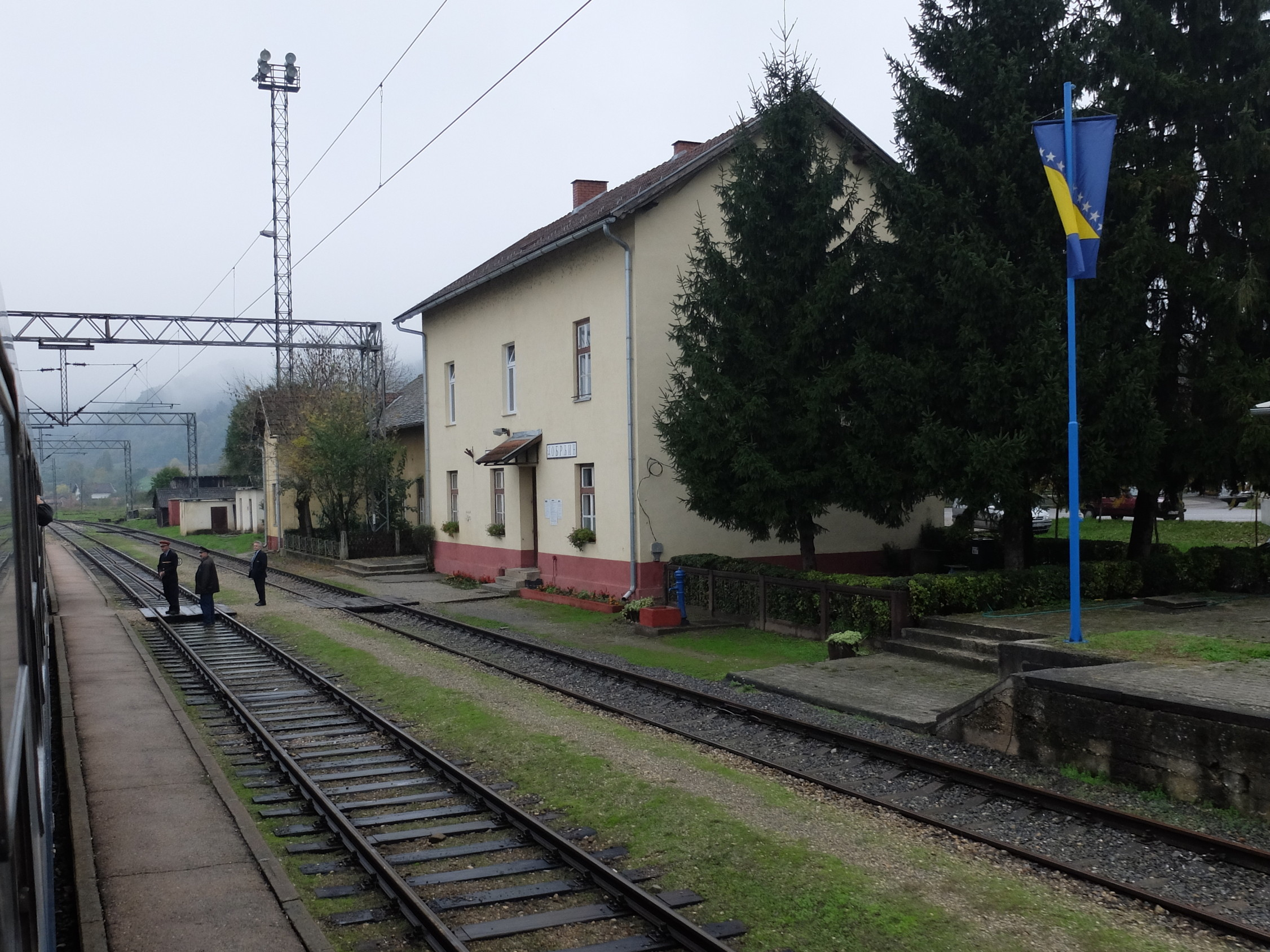
- Railway station

- Location within Bosnia and Herzegovina
- Coordinates: 45°09′02″N 16°28′45″E
- Country: Bosnia and Herzegovina
- Entity: Republika Srpska
- Municipality: Novi Grad
- Time zone: UTC+1 (CET)
  - Summer (DST): UTC+2 (CEST)

Dobrljin (Cyrillic: Добрљин) is a village in the municipality of Novi Grad, Republika Srpska, Bosnia and Herzegovina.

== History ==
The first railway line in Bosnia and Herzegovina was completed between Dobrljin and Banja Luka in 1873.

== See also ==
- Church of St. Nicholas, Dobrljin
