= Vitasovci =

Vitasovci Витасовци
- Village
- Location of Vitasovci in Bosnia and Herzegovina
- Coordinates: 45°01′27″N 16°29′03″E
- Country: Bosnia and Herzegovina
- Entity: Republika Srpska
- Municipality: Novi Grad
- Time zone: UTC+1 (CET)
  - Summer (DST): UTC+2 (CEST)

Vitasovci (Cyrillic: Витасовци) is a village in the municipality of Novi Grad, Republika Srpska, Bosnia and Herzegovina. In 1991, it had a population of 386.
