= Grabašnica =

Grabašnica Грабашница
- Village
- Location within Bosnia and Herzegovina
- Coordinates: 45°05′N 16°35′E
- Country: Bosnia and Herzegovina
- Entity: Republika Srpska
- Municipality: Novi Grad
- Time zone: UTC+1 (CET)
  - Summer (DST): UTC+2 (CEST)

Grabašnica (Cyrillic: Грабашница) is a village in the municipality of Novi Grad, Republika Srpska, Bosnia and Herzegovina.
