= Gornji Rakani =

- Village
- Location within Bosnia and Herzegovina
- Coordinates: 44°58′56″N 16°18′13″E
- Country: Bosnia and Herzegovina
- Entity: Republika Srpska
- Municipality: Novi Grad
- Time zone: UTC+1 (CET)
  - Summer (DST): UTC+2 (CEST)

Gornji Rakani (Cyrillic: Горњи Ракани) is a village in the municipality of Novi Grad, Republika Srpska, Bosnia and Herzegovina.

== Notable people ==
Oste Erceg, Bosnian Serb painter and artist
