= Lješljani =

- Village
- Location within Bosnia and Herzegovina
- Coordinates: 45°06′N 16°29′E
- Country: Bosnia and Herzegovina
- Entity: Republika Srpska
- Municipality: Novi Grad
- Time zone: UTC+1 (CET)
  - Summer (DST): UTC+2 (CEST)

Lješljani (Cyrillic: Љешљани) is a village in the municipality of Novi Grad, Republika Srpska, Bosnia and Herzegovina.
