= Donji Rakani =

- Village
- Location within Bosnia and Herzegovina
- Coordinates: 44°59′22″N 16°19′08″E
- Country: Bosnia and Herzegovina
- Entity: Republika Srpska
- Municipality: Novi Grad
- Time zone: UTC+1 (CET)
  - Summer (DST): UTC+2 (CEST)

Donji Rakani (Cyrillic: Доњи Ракани) is a village in the municipality of Novi Grad, Republika Srpska, Bosnia and Herzegovina.
