= Cerovica (Novi Grad) =

Cerovica Церовица
- Village
- Location within Bosnia and Herzegovina
- Coordinates: 45°05′58″N 16°26′12″E
- Country: Bosnia and Herzegovina
- Entity: Republika Srpska
- Municipality: Novi Grad
- Time zone: UTC+1 (CET)
  - Summer (DST): UTC+2 (CEST)

Cerovica (Serbian: Церовица) is a village in the municipality of Novi Grad, Republika Srpska, Bosnia and Herzegovina.
