= Trgovište, Bosnia and Herzegovina =

Trgovište Трговиште
- Village
- Location within Bosnia and Herzegovina
- Coordinates: 44°59′33″N 16°33′30″E
- Country: Bosnia and Herzegovina
- Entity: Republika Srpska
- Municipality: Novi Grad, Bosnia and Herzegovina
- Elevation: 781 ft (238 m)

Population (1991)
  - Total: 377
- Time zone: UTC+1 (CET)

Trgovište (Cyrillic: Трговиште) is a village in the municipality of Novi Grad, Bosnia and Herzegovina.
