= Suhača (Novi Grad) =

Coordinates: 44°58′48″N 16°26′18″E

- Village
- Location within Bosnia and Herzegovina
- Country: Bosnia and Herzegovina
- Entity: Republika Srpska
- Municipality: Novi Grad
- Time zone: UTC+1 (CET)
  - Summer (DST): UTC+2 (CEST)

Suhača (Serbian: Сухача) is a village in the municipality of Bosanski Novi/Novi Grad, Republika Srpska, Bosnia and Herzegovina.
