= Rašće =

- Village
- Location within Bosnia and Herzegovina
- Coordinates: 44°55′49″N 16°16′32″E
- Country: Bosnia and Herzegovina
- Entity: Republika Srpska
- Municipality: Novi Grad
- Time zone: UTC+1 (CET)
  - Summer (DST): UTC+2 (CEST)

Rašće (Cyrillic: Рашће) is a village in the municipality of Novi Grad, Republika Srpska, Bosnia and Herzegovina.
