= Čađavica Srednja (Novi Grad) =

- Village
- Location within Bosnia and Herzegovina
- Coordinates: 44°58′N 16°22′E
- Country: Bosnia and Herzegovina
- Entity: Republika Srpska
- Municipality: Novi Grad
- Time zone: UTC+1 (CET)
  - Summer (DST): UTC+2 (CEST)

Čađavica Srednja (Serbian Cyrillic: Чађавица Средња) is a village in the municipality of Novi Grad, Republika Srpska, Bosnia and Herzegovina.
