= Petkovac, Bosnia and Herzegovina =

Petkovac
- Village
- Location within Bosnia and Herzegovina
- Coordinates: 45°03′03″N 16°30′14″E
- Country: Bosnia and Herzegovina
- Entity: Republika Srpska
- Municipality: Novi Grad

Population (1991)
  - Total: 227
- Time zone: UTC+1 (CET)
  - Summer (DST): UTC+2 (CEST)

Petkovac (Serbian Cyrillic: Петковац) is a village in the municipality of Novi Grad, Republika Srpska, Bosnia and Herzegovina.
