= Cerovica (Stanari) =

Cerovica Церовица
- Village
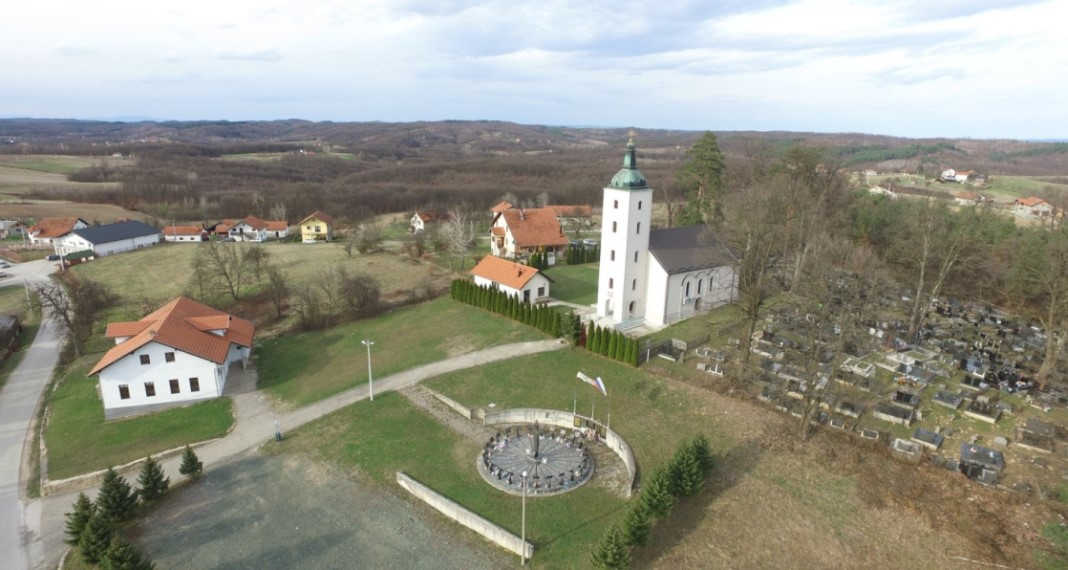

- Location within Bosnia and Herzegovina
- Coordinates: 44°43′03″N 17°53′17″E
- Country: Bosnia and Herzegovina
- Entity: Republika Srpska
- Municipality: Stanari
- Time zone: UTC+1 (CET)
  - Summer (DST): UTC+2 (CEST)

Cerovica (Serbian: Церовица) is a village in the municipality of Stanari, Bosnia and Herzegovina.
