= Novi Grad, Bosnia and Herzegovina =

Novi Grad Нови Град
- Town and municipality
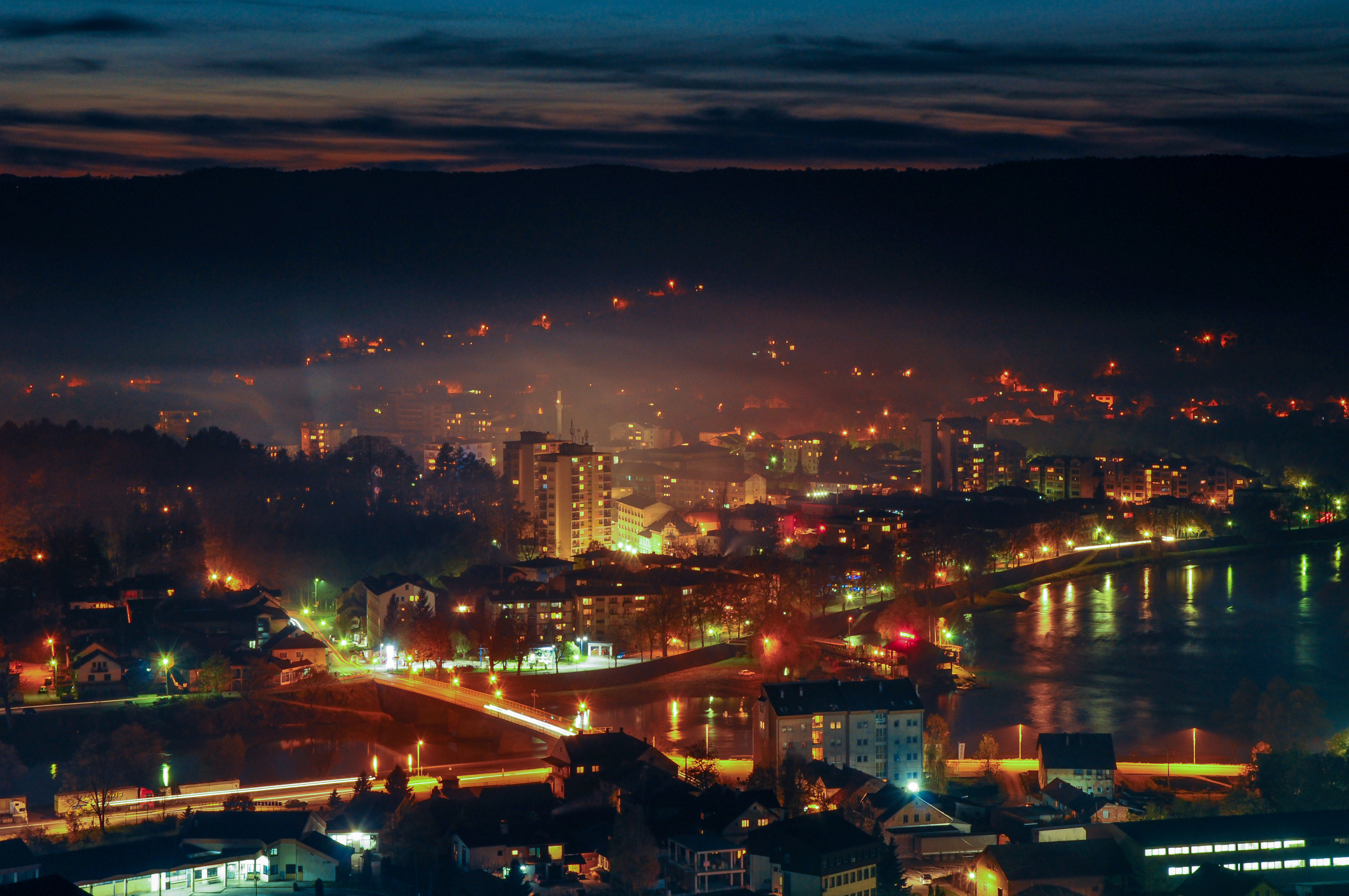
- Novi Grad

- Location of Novi Grad within Republika Srpska

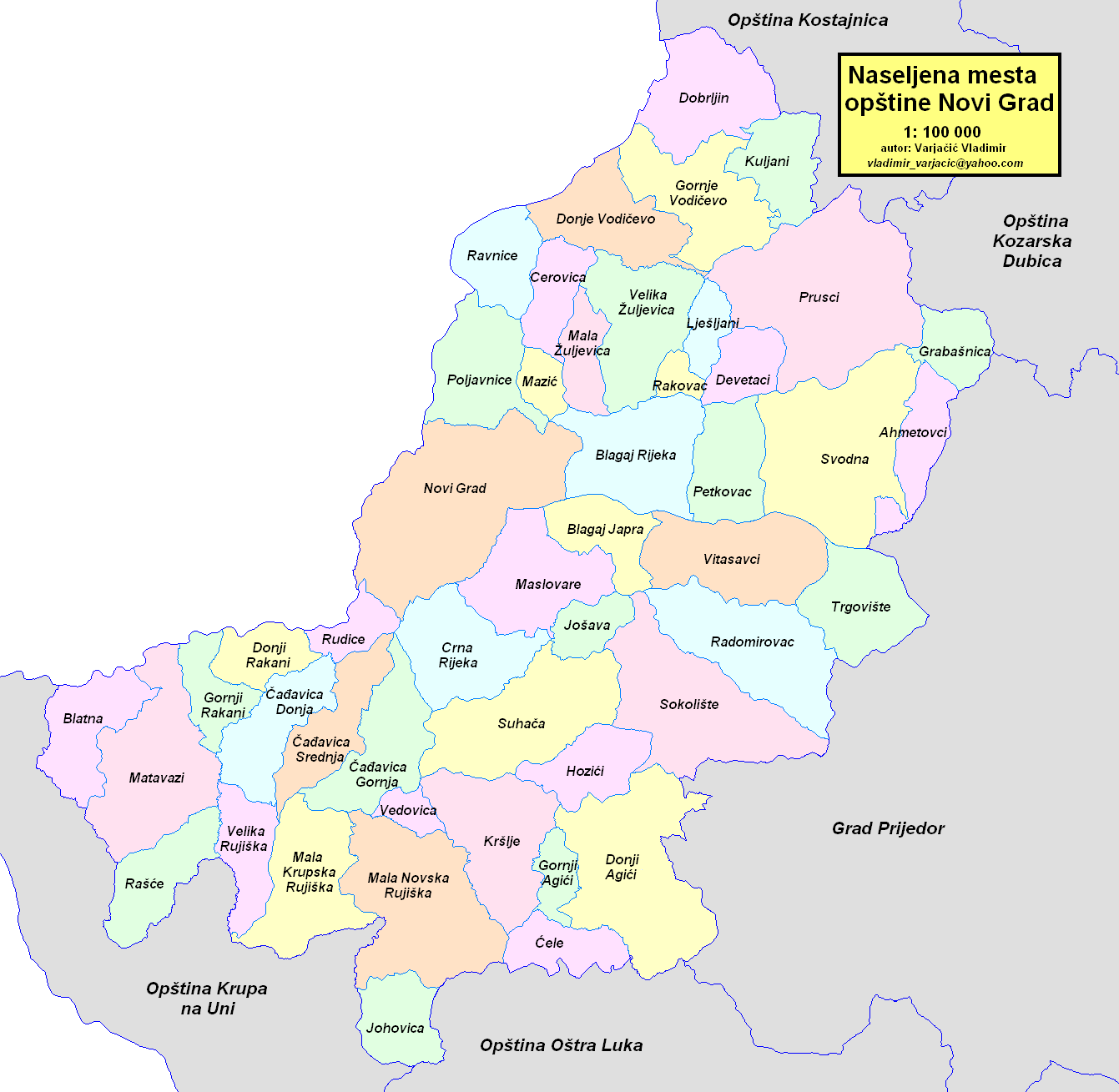
- Coordinates: 45°02′53″N 16°22′37″E
- Country: Bosnia and Herzegovina
- Entity: Republika Srpska
- Geographical region: Bosanska Krajina

Government
  - Municipal mayor: Miroslav Drljača (SNSD)
  - Municipality: 472.72 km^{2} (182.52 sq mi)

Population (2013 census)
  - Town: 11,063
  - Municipality: 27,115
  - Municipality density: 57.360/km^{2} (148.56/sq mi)
- Postal code: +387 052
- Website: www.opstina-novigrad.com

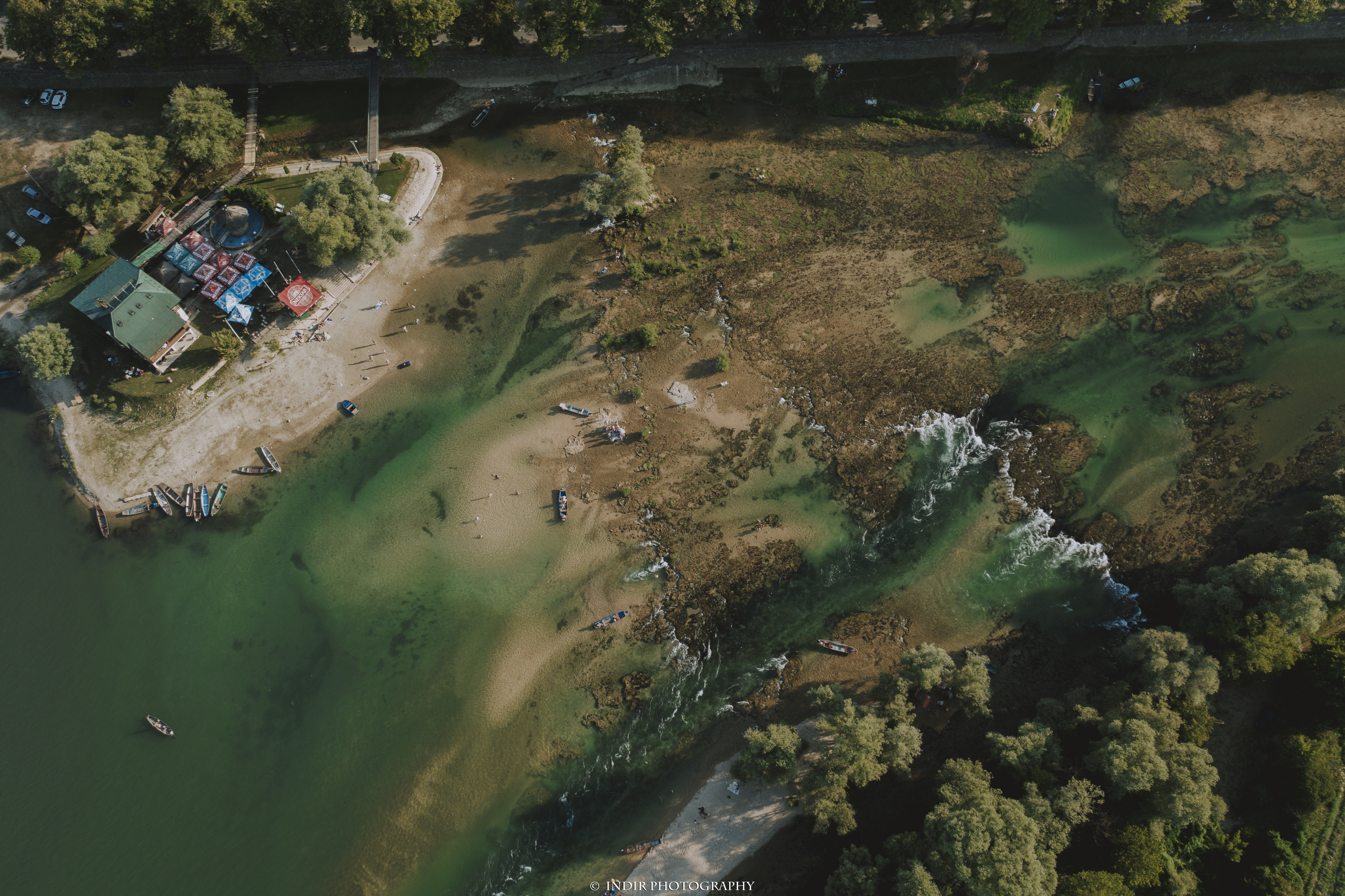
River Una Novi Grad

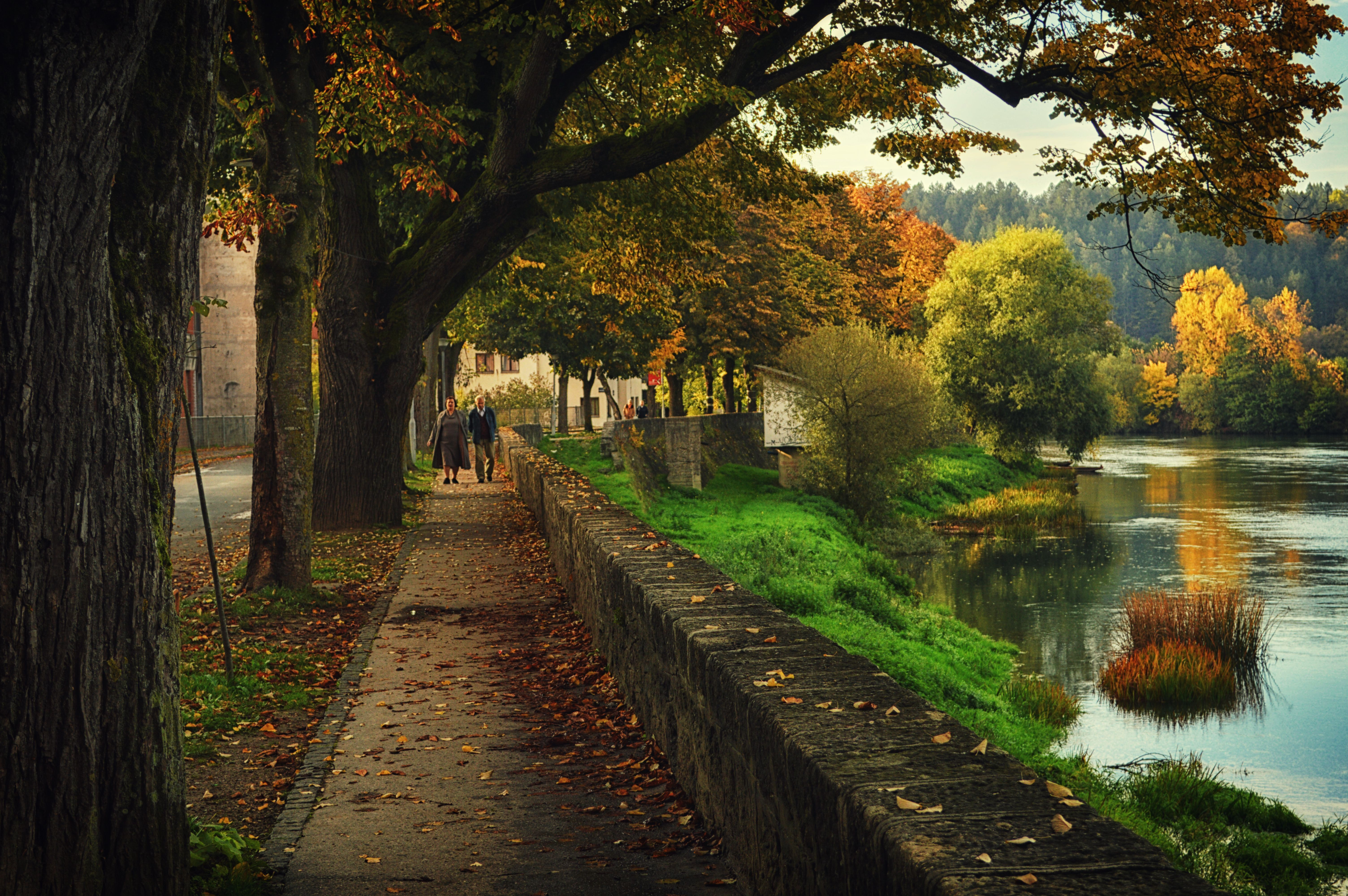
Autumn in Novi Grad

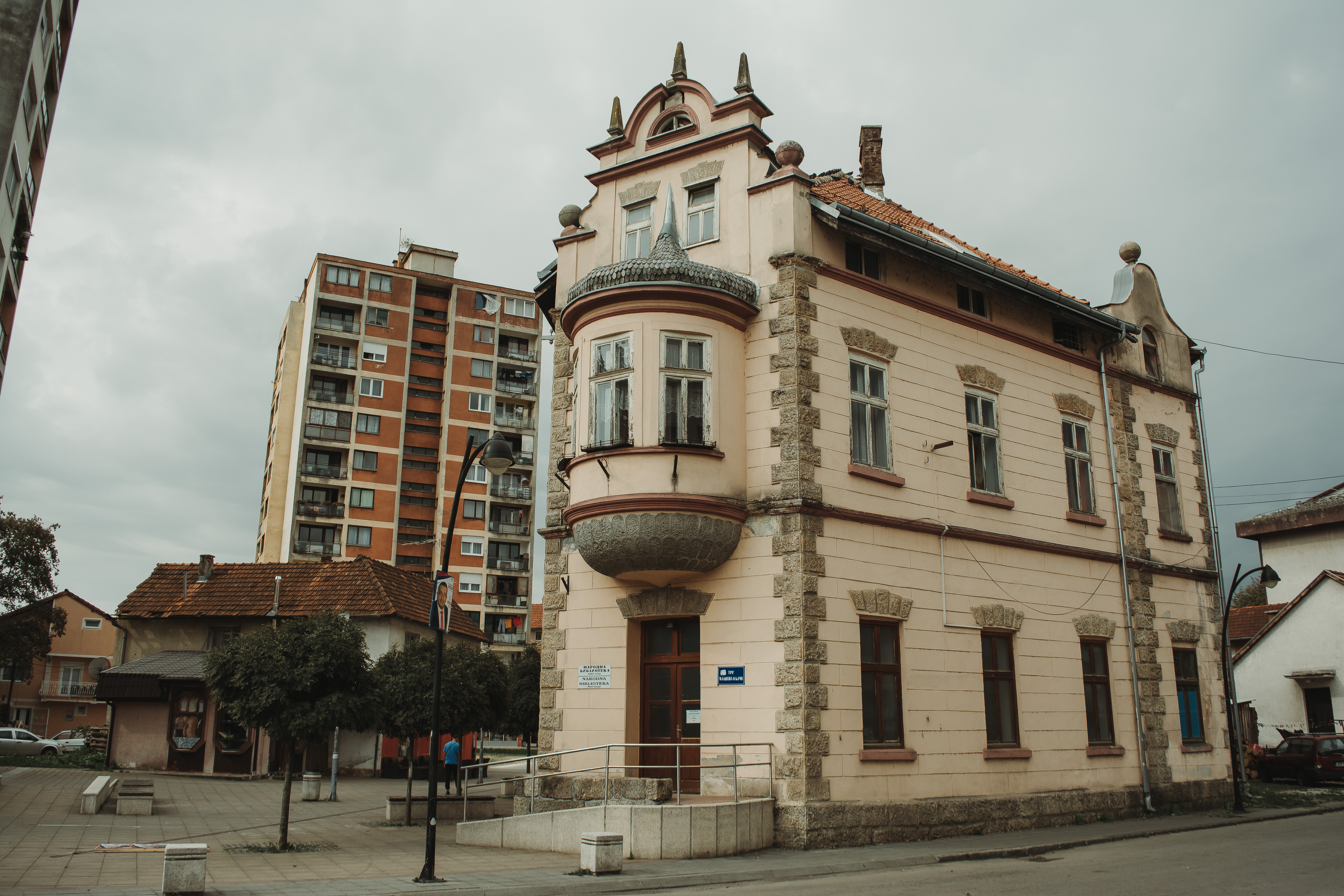
Library Novi Grad

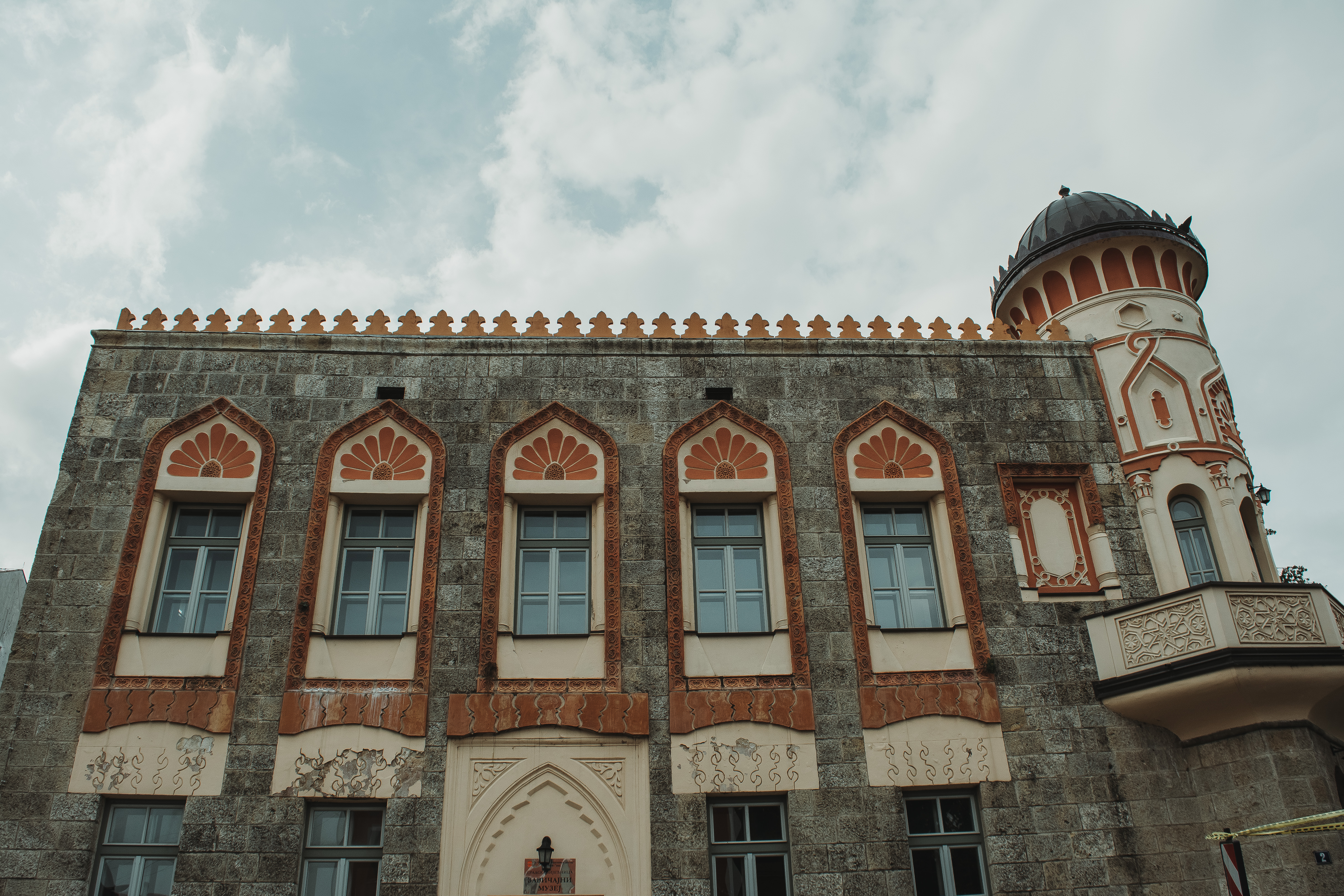
City Hall Novi Grad

Novi Grad (Serbian Cyrillic: Нови Град), formerly Bosanski Novi (Serbian Cyrillic: Босански Нови), is a town and municipality in Republika Srpska, Bosnia and Herzegovina. Situated in the far northwest of the country, it lies across the Una from the Croatian town of Dvor. According to the 2013 census, the town has a population of 11,063 while its municipality comprises a total of 27,115 inhabitants.

Known for its scenic quay, Novi Grad lies at the confluence of the Una and Sana rivers.

== Geography ==
Novi Grad is located on the right bank of the Una and both banks of the Sana, between two geographic zones: the slopes of the mountains of Grmeč and Kozara, and the alluvial land surrounding the town's two rivers. The town itself is located 122 m (400 feet) above sea level, at nearly 45°N; the climate is temperate-continental. Its governed municipality covers an area of 470 km^{2} (180 sq mi).

=== Climate ===
Novi Grad's climate is oceanic (Köppen: Cfb), bordering on a humid subtropical climate (Köppen: Cfa).

Climate data for Novi Grad (1991–2020)
Month	Jan	Feb	Mar	Apr	May	Jun	Jul	Aug	Sep	Oct	Nov	Dec	Year
Mean daily maximum °C (°F)	4.9 (40.8)	7.6 (45.7)	12.9 (55.2)	17.9 (64.2)	22.4 (72.3)	26.3 (79.3)	28.3 (82.9)	28.2 (82.8)	22.3 (72.1)	17.0 (62.6)	10.9 (51.6)	5.3 (41.5)	17.0 (62.6)
Mean daily minimum °C (°F)	−2.3 (27.9)	−1.9 (28.6)	1.2 (34.2)	5.5 (41.9)	10.0 (50.0)	13.9 (57.0)	15.5 (59.9)	15.3 (59.5)	11.3 (52.3)	7.3 (45.1)	3.0 (37.4)	−1.2 (29.8)	6.5 (43.7)
Average precipitation mm (inches)	84.9 (3.34)	83.5 (3.29)	87.2 (3.43)	99.4 (3.91)	113.3 (4.46)	110.9 (4.37)	89.6 (3.53)	75.7 (2.98)	126.8 (4.99)	104.8 (4.13)	112.0 (4.41)	103.1 (4.06)	1,191.1 (46.89)
Average precipitation days (≥ 1.0 mm)	10.4	10.2	10.3	11.4	11.6	10.2	8.8	7.3	10.1	9.8	11.2	11.1	122.6
Source: NOAA

== History ==
The town was first mentioned in 1280 under the Latin name Castrum Novum which translated means 'new fort'. In 1483, the Battle of Una was fought near the city. It belonged to the counts of Blagaj, a cadet branch of the Babonić family, and in the early sixteenth century came under power of Nikola Zrinski. Croatian ban Adam Bačan conquered Novi in 1693. Evliya Çelebi on his journey through Bosnia mentions that Croatian nobles built Novi Grad. In 1895, during Austro-Hungarian rule in Bosnia and Herzegovina, the town was officially given the name Bosanski Novi. At the same time, the city included around 3,300 people with 550 households. Wooden bridges existed across the Una and Sana rivers which the citizens had to guard against floods in the autumn and spring. For that reason, a current-day symbol of the town was built in 1906—the Una quay.

Upon the conclusion of the Treaty of Passarowitz in 1718, Novi was to be transferred to the Habsburg monarchy.

In 1872, Novi Grad was the first municipality to have a train station on the new Bosnian railway, which afforded it significant cultural and economic advantages over other Krajina municipalities. The first hospital was established around the same time.

From 1929 to 1941, Bosanski Novi was part of the Vrbas Banovina of the Kingdom of Yugoslavia.

From 1992 through 1995, the town was ethnically cleansed of its Bosniak and Croat inhabitants, thereby rendering it almost completely Serb-populated. In order to distance the town from its Bosnian history and its cultural roots and in tune with the war politics, the local Serb government renamed the town to Novi Grad, a change criticized by Croat and Bosniak residents. Consequently, the majority of people from Bosanski Novi were misplaced and live all over Europe, the American continent, Australia and elsewhere around the globe.

After the Bosnian War, Kostajnica was split from the municipality.

== Settlements ==
Aside from the town of Novi Grad, the municipality includes the following settlements:

- Ahmetovci
- Blagaj Japra
- Blagaj Rijeka
- Blatna
- Cerovica
- Crna Rijeka
- Čađavica Donja
- Čađavica Gornja
- Čađavica Srednja
- Ćele
- Devetaci
- Dobrljin
- Donje Vodičevo
- Donji Agići
- Donji Rakani
- Gornje Vodičevo
- Gornji Agići
- Gornji Rakani
- Grabašnica
- Hozići
- Johovica
- Jošava
- Kršlje
- Kuljani
- Lješljani
- Mala Krupska Rujiška
- Mala Novska Rujiška
- Mala Žuljevica
- Maslovare
- Matavazi
- Mazić
- Petkovac
- Poljavnice
- Prusci
- Radomirovac
- Rakovac
- Rašće
- Ravnice
- Rudice
- Sokolište
- Suhača
- Svodna
- Trgovište
- Vedovica
- Velika Rujiška
- Velika Žuljevica
- Vitasovci

== Demographics ==
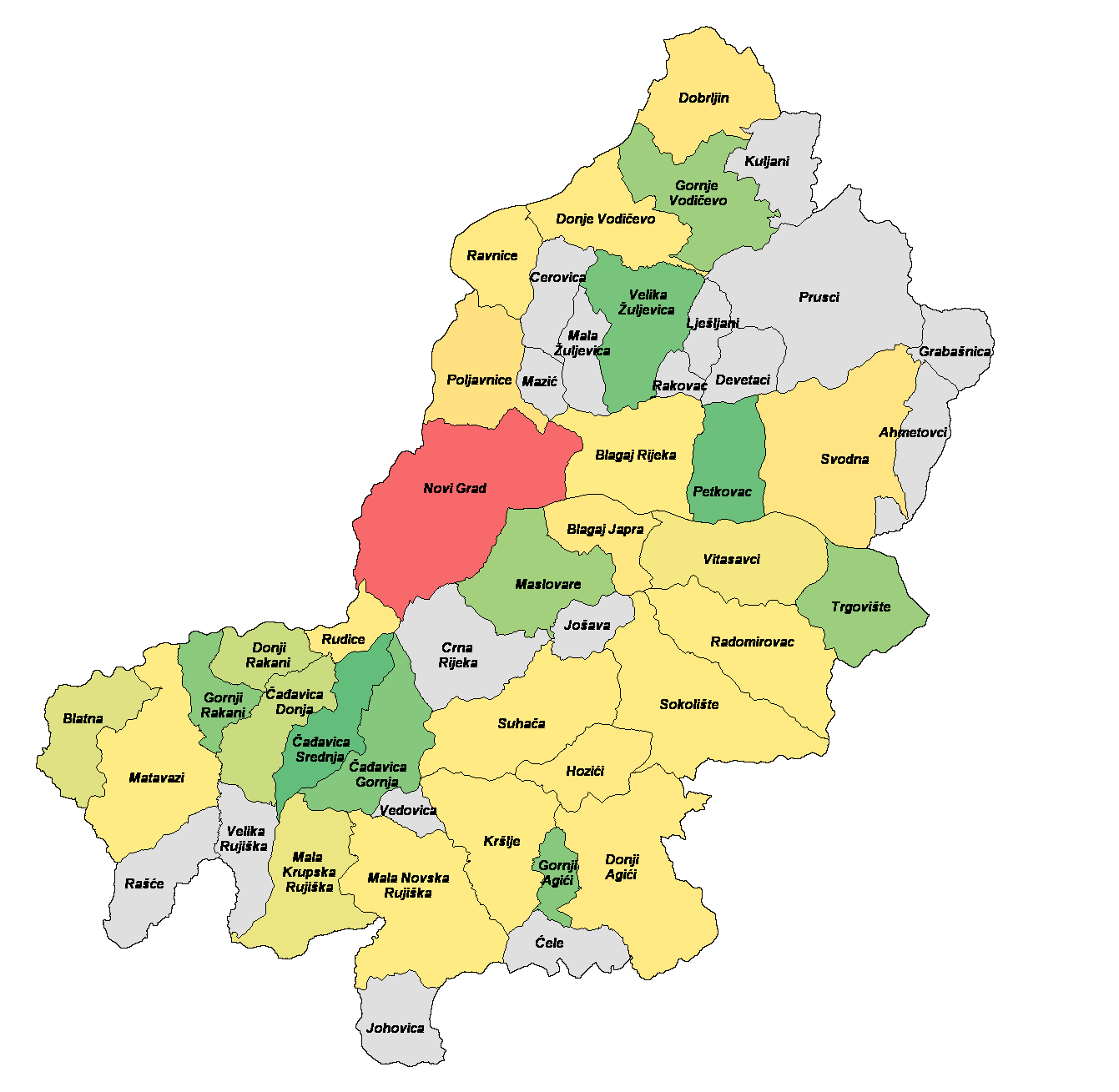
Novi Grad by population proportional to the settlement with the highest and lowest population

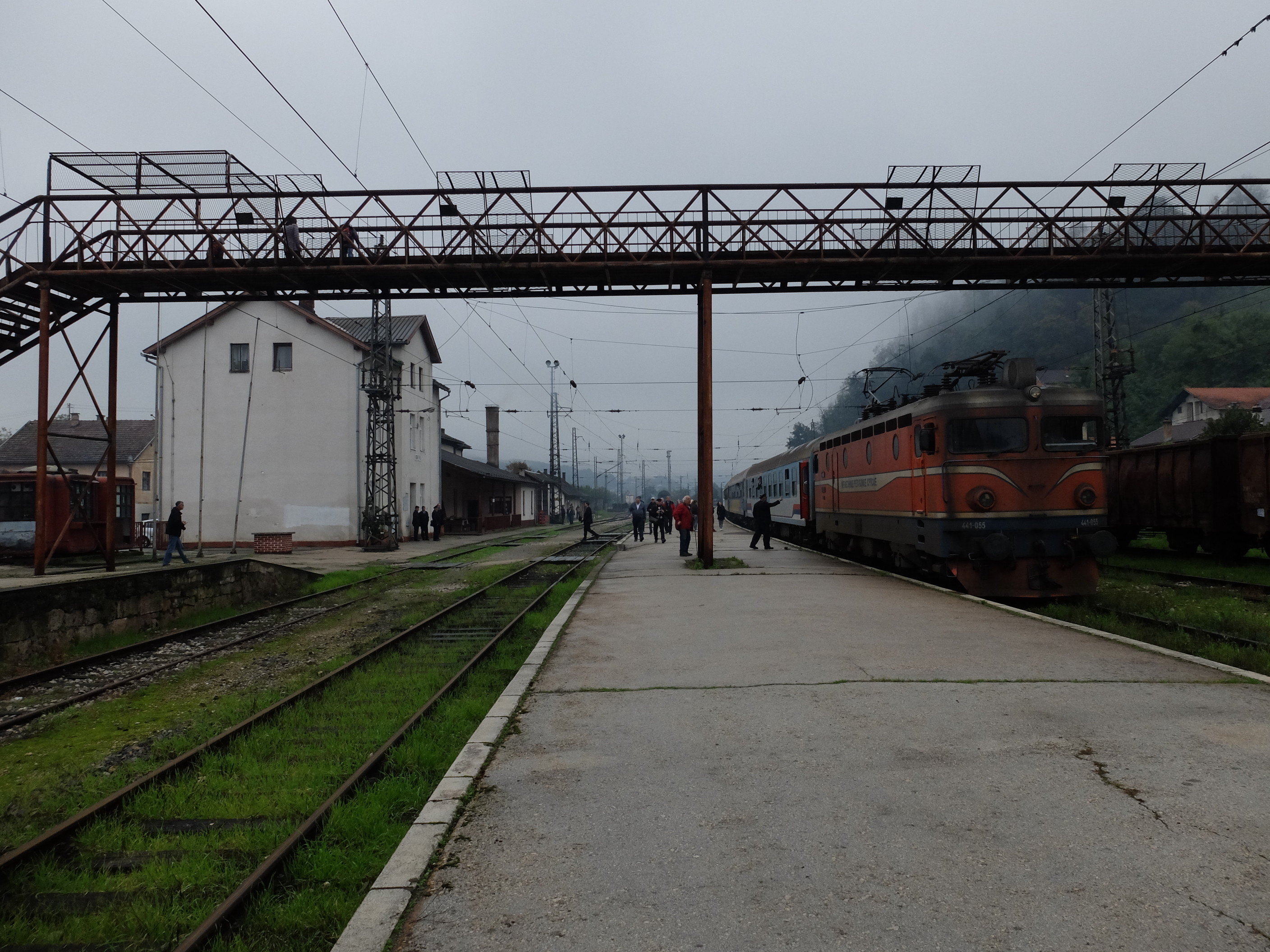
Railway station

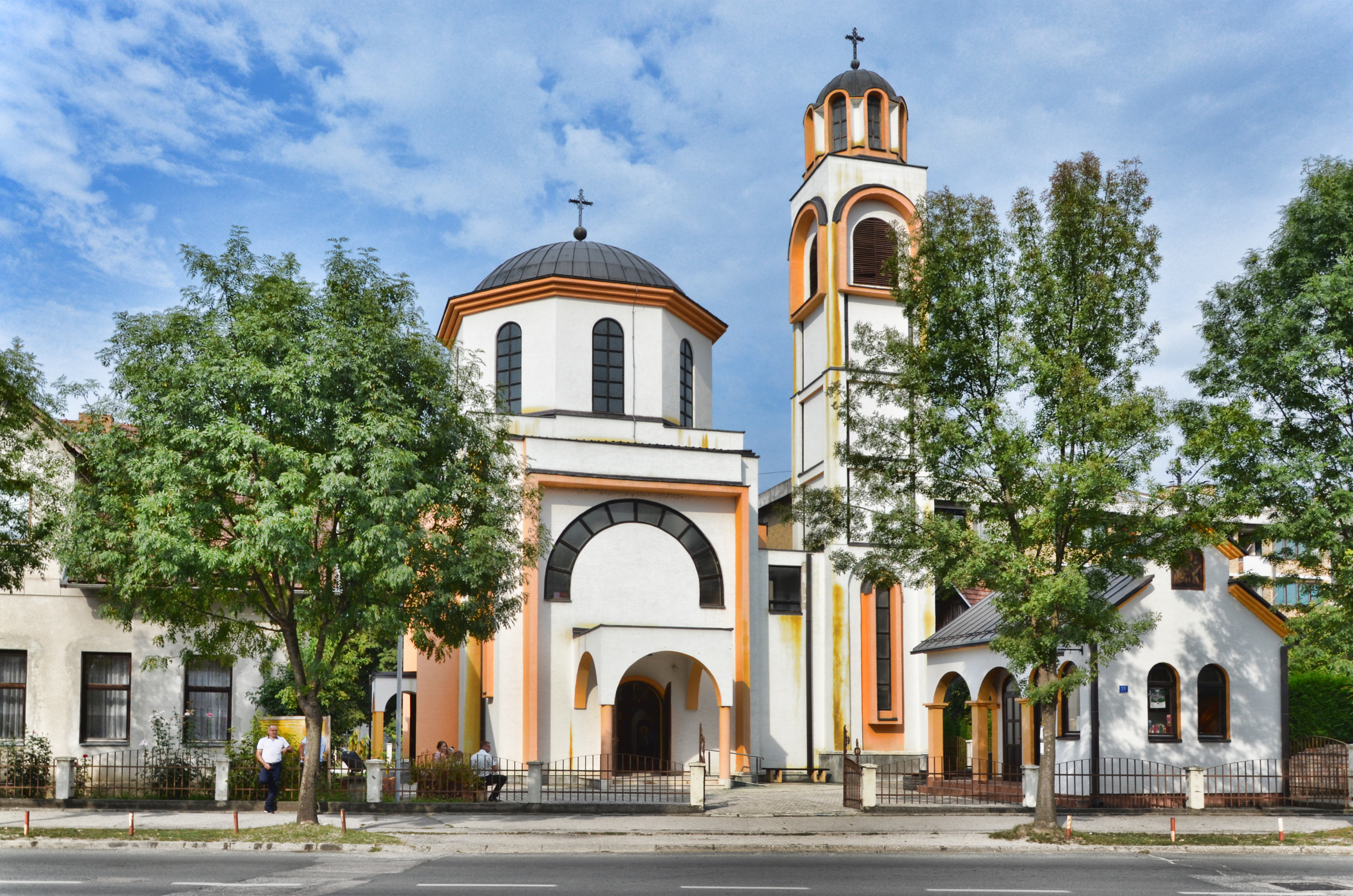
Serbian Orthodox St. Peter and Paul church

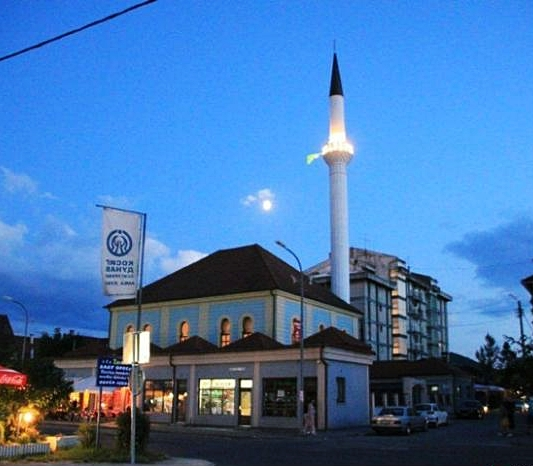
Mosque in Novi Grad

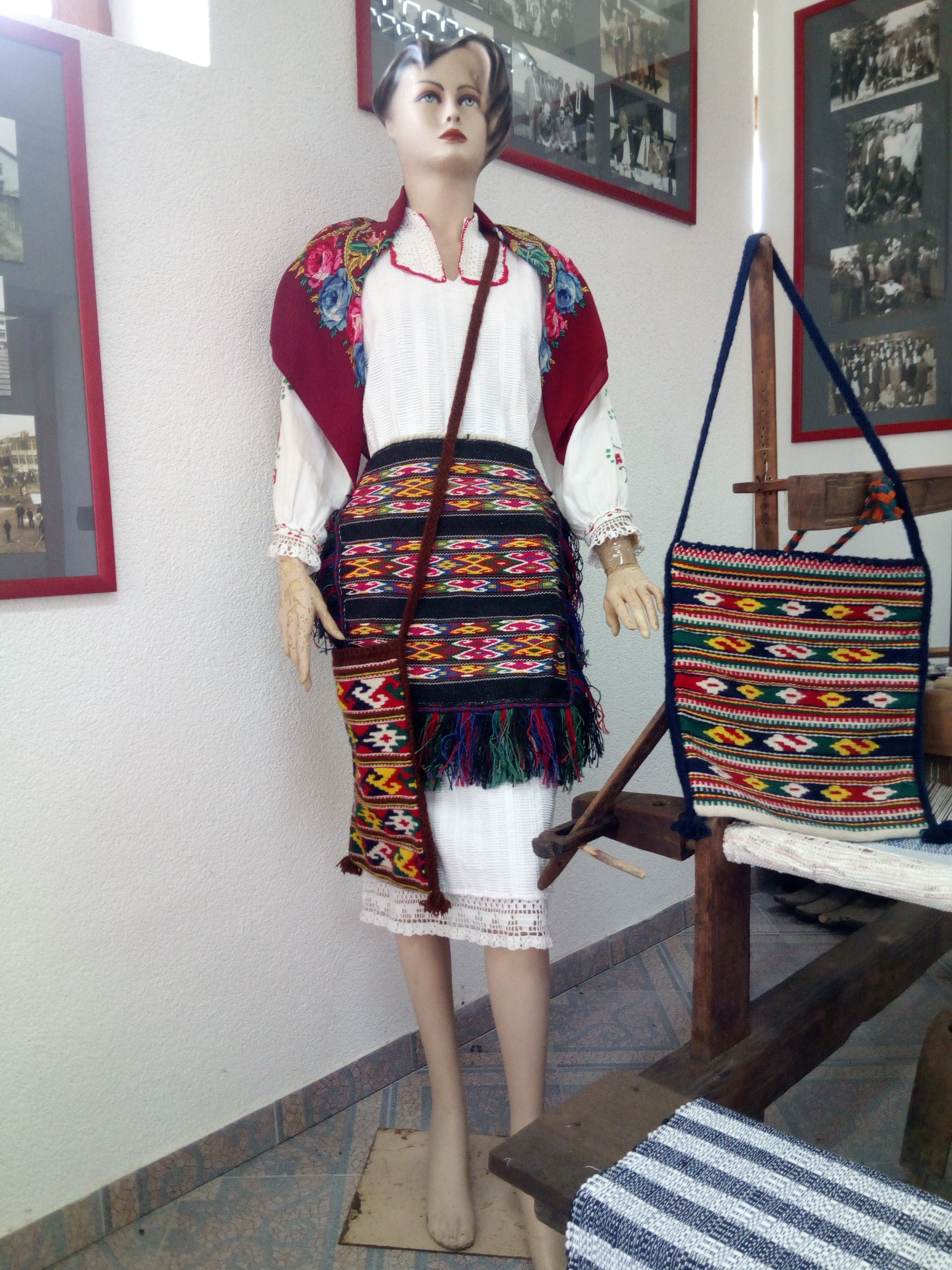
Exhibit from the city museum

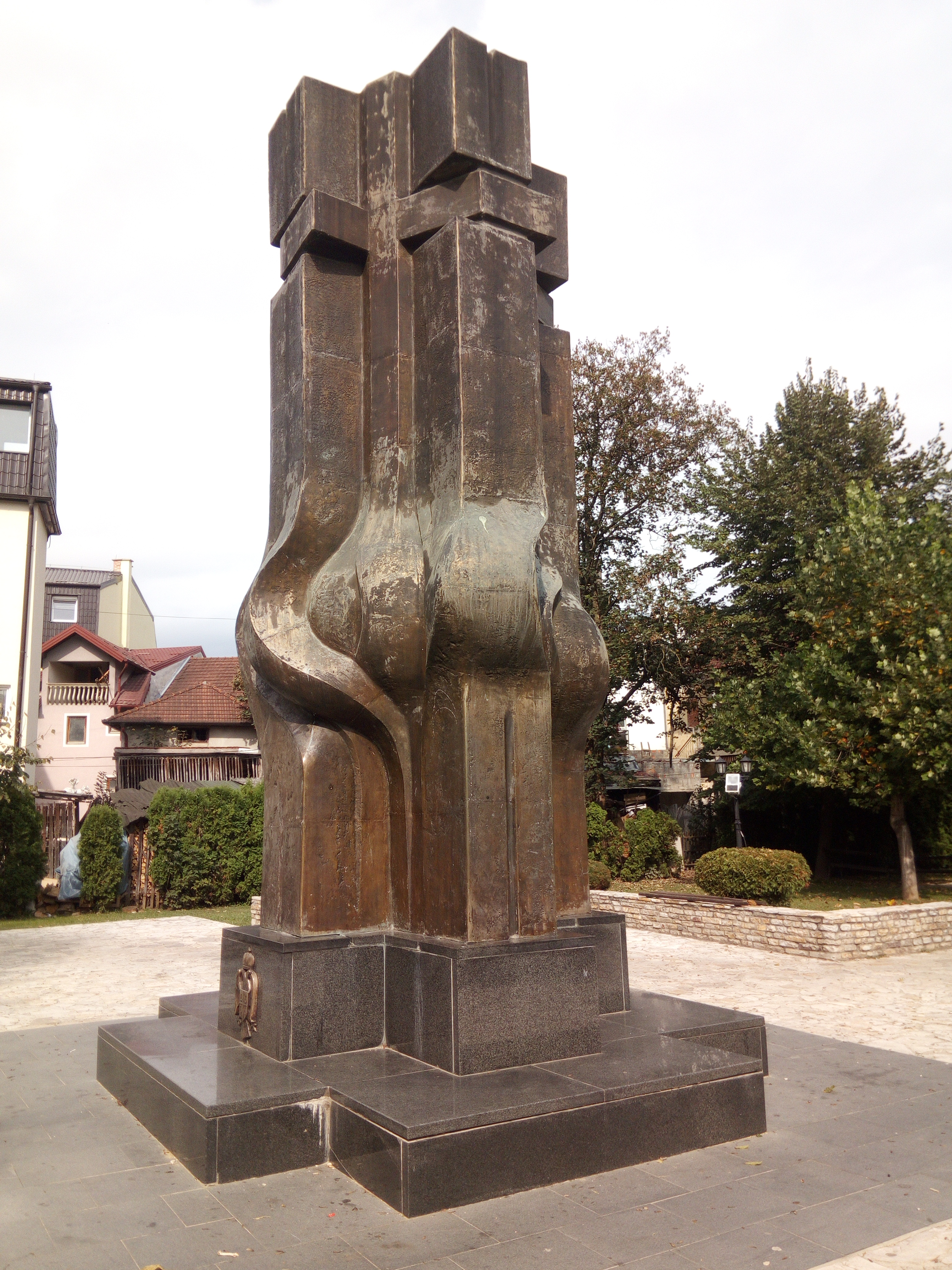
Monument dedicate to the Serb fighters of the Bosnian war

=== Population ===
Population of settlements – Novi Grad municipality
		1948.	1953.	1961.	1971.	1981.	1991.	2013.
	Total				41,216	42,142	41,665	27,115
1	Ahmetovci							
2	Blagaj Japra						1,279	807
3	Blagaj Rijeka						980	488
4	Blatna						443	367
5	Cerovica							
6	Crna Rijeka							
7	Čađavica Donja						408	338
8	Čađavica Gornja						297	240
9	Čađavica Srednja						262	192
10	Ćele							
11	Devetaci							
12	Dobrljin						1,141	858
13	Donje Vodičevo						801	615
14	Donji Agići						935	637
15	Donji Rakani						315	338
16	Gornje Vodičevo						368	278
17	Gornji Agići						540	244
18	Gornji Rakani						254	249
19	Grabašnica							
20	Hozići						958	610
21	Johovica							
22	Jošava							
23	Kršlje						632	434
24	Kuljani							
25	Lješljani							
26	Mala Krupska Rujiška						431	384
27	Mala Novska Rujiška						573	412
28	Mala Žuljevica							
29	Maslovare						500	284
30	Matavazi						563	466
31	Mazić							
32	Novi Grad	4,070	4,884	7,023	9,849	12,186	13,588	11,063
33	Petkovac						227	205
34	Poljavnice						1,137	1,266
35	Prusci							
36	Radomirovac						557	419
37	Rakovac							
38	Rašće							
39	Ravnice						639	581
40	Rudice						452	590
41	Sokolište						611	410
42	Suhača						1,087	506
43	Svodna						1,270	1,038
44	Trgovište						377	274
45	Vedovica							
46	Velika Rujiška							
47	Velika Žuljevica						410	224
48	Vitasovci						385	399

=== Ethnic composition ===
Ethnic composition – Novi Grad town
	2013.	1991.	1981.	1971.
Total	11,063 (100,0%)	13,588 (100,0%)	12,186 (100,0%)	9,849 (100,0%)
Muslims/Bosniaks		6,831 (50,27%)	5,211 (42,76%)	5,520 (56,05%)
Serbs		5,121 (37,69%)	3,900 (32,00%)	3,610 (36,65%)
Yugoslavs		1,117 (8,220%)	2,647 (21,72%)	308 (3,127%)
Others		332 (2,443%)	42 (0,345%)	74 (0,751%)
Croats		187 (1,376%)	217 (1,781%)	287 (2,914%)
Albanians			77 (0,632%)	20 (0,203%)
Roma			66 (0,542%)	
Montenegrins			16 (0,131%)	18 (0,183%)
Slovenes			8 (0,066%)	11 (0,112%)
Macedonians			1 (0,008%)	
Hungarians			1 (0,008%)	1 (0,010%)

Ethnic composition
	2013.	1991.	1981.	1971.
Total	27,115 (100,0%)	41,665 (100,0%)	42,142 (100,0%)	41,216 (100,0%)
Serbs	20,116 (74,19%)	25,101 (60,24%)	25,098 (59,56%)	28,328 (68,73%)
Muslims/Bosniaks	6,439 (23,75%)	14,040 (33,70%)	11,745 (27,87%)	11,625 (28,21%)
Others	379 (1,398%)	564 (1,354%)	116 (0,275%)	173 (0,420%)
Croats	181 (0,668%)	403 (0,967%)	458 (1,087%)	640 (1,553%)
Yugoslavs		1 557 (3,737%)	4 525 (10,74%)	366 (0,888%)
Albanians			85 (0,202%)	26 (0,063%)
Roma			72 (0,171%)	
Montenegrins			24 (0,057%)	32 (0,078%)
Slovenes			10 (0,024%)	19 (0,046%)
Hungarians			6 (0,014%)	5 (0,012%)
Macedonians			3 (0,007%)	2 (0,005%)

== Economy ==
The economy is based on a few industries and a number of private firms. Novi Grad has notable potential in tourism, wood processing, food production and management of water resources.

The following table gives a preview of total number of registered people employed in legal entities per their core activity (as of 2018):

Activity	Total
Agriculture, forestry and fishing	92
Mining and quarrying	47
Manufacturing	722
Electricity, gas, steam and air conditioning supply	103
Water supply; sewerage, waste management and remediation activities	91
Construction	30
Wholesale and retail trade, repair of motor vehicles and motorcycles	1,038
Transportation and storage	438
Accommodation and food services	243
Information and communication	28
Financial and insurance activities	47
Real estate activities	4
Professional, scientific and technical activities	96
Administrative and support service activities	10
Public administration and defense; compulsory social security	304
Education	424
Human health and social work activities	187
Arts, entertainment and recreation	22
Other service activities	72
Total	3,998

== Sport ==
There are several active sports organizations in the town, including football, handball and basketball clubs.

The local football club is FK Sloboda Novi Grad.

== See also ==
- Municipalities of Bosnia and Herzegovina
- Bosanska Krajina

== Bibliography ==
- Roksandić, Drago (2007-10-01). "Posavska krajina/granica od 1718. do 1739. godine". Ekonomska i ekohistorija: časopis za gospodarsku povijest i povijest okoliša (in Serbo-Croatian) (3): 62–82. eISSN 1849-0190.
- Pelidija, Enes (1989). Bosanski ejalet od Karlovačkog do Požarevačkog mira 1699 - 1718 (in Serbo-Croatian). Sarajevo. pp. 237–259.
- Mangold, Max (2005), Das Aussprachewörterbuch, Duden, ISBN 9783411040667
